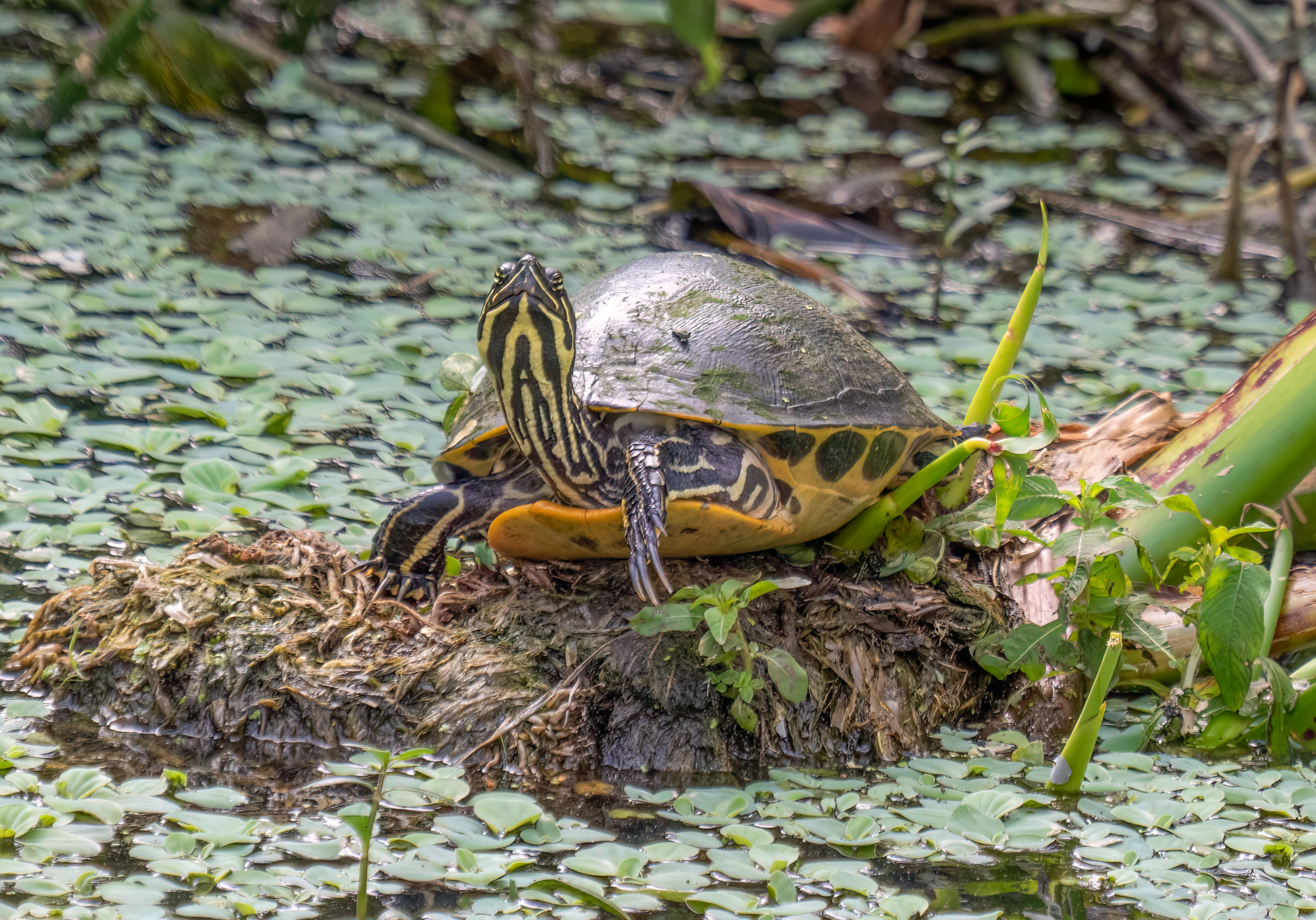

Conservation status
- Least Concern (IUCN 3.1)

Scientific classification
- Kingdom: Animalia
- Phylum: Chordata
- Class: Reptilia
- Order: Testudines
- Suborder: Cryptodira
- Family: Emydidae
- Genus: Pseudemys
- Species: P. peninsularis

Binomial name
- Pseudemys peninsularis (Carr, 1938)

Synonyms
- Pseudemys floridana peninsularis Carr, 1938; Pseudemys floridana penunsularis Allen, 1939 (ex errore); Chrysemys floridana peninsularis Weaver & Rose, 1967; Pseudemys peninsularis Seidel, 1994

= Peninsula cooter =

Species of turtle

The peninsula cooter (Pseudemys peninsularis), sometimes referred to as the peninsular cooter, is a species of freshwater turtle in the genus Pseudemys. It is sometimes considered a subspecies of the coastal plain cooter (P. floridana) when that turtle is not itself considered a subspecies of the river cooter (P. concinna).

== Description ==
The peninsula cooter is an average sized member of the family Emydidae, typically reaching carapace lengths of 9-13 in (23–33 cm) and weights of 5-15 lbs (2.27-6.8 kg). However, they are capable of surpassing 16" (40.64 cm) and 35 pounds (15.876 kg). Peninsula cooters can be distinguished from the Florida red-bellied cooter (Pseudemys nelsoni) by their lack of a reddish plastron and the presence of dozens of yellow stripes on their carapace, limbs, head, and tail. Males can be distinguished from females by not only their smaller size, but their greatly elongated front claws. These claws are used to stimulate the female prior to mating.

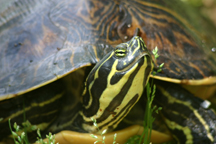
Close up on face/beak

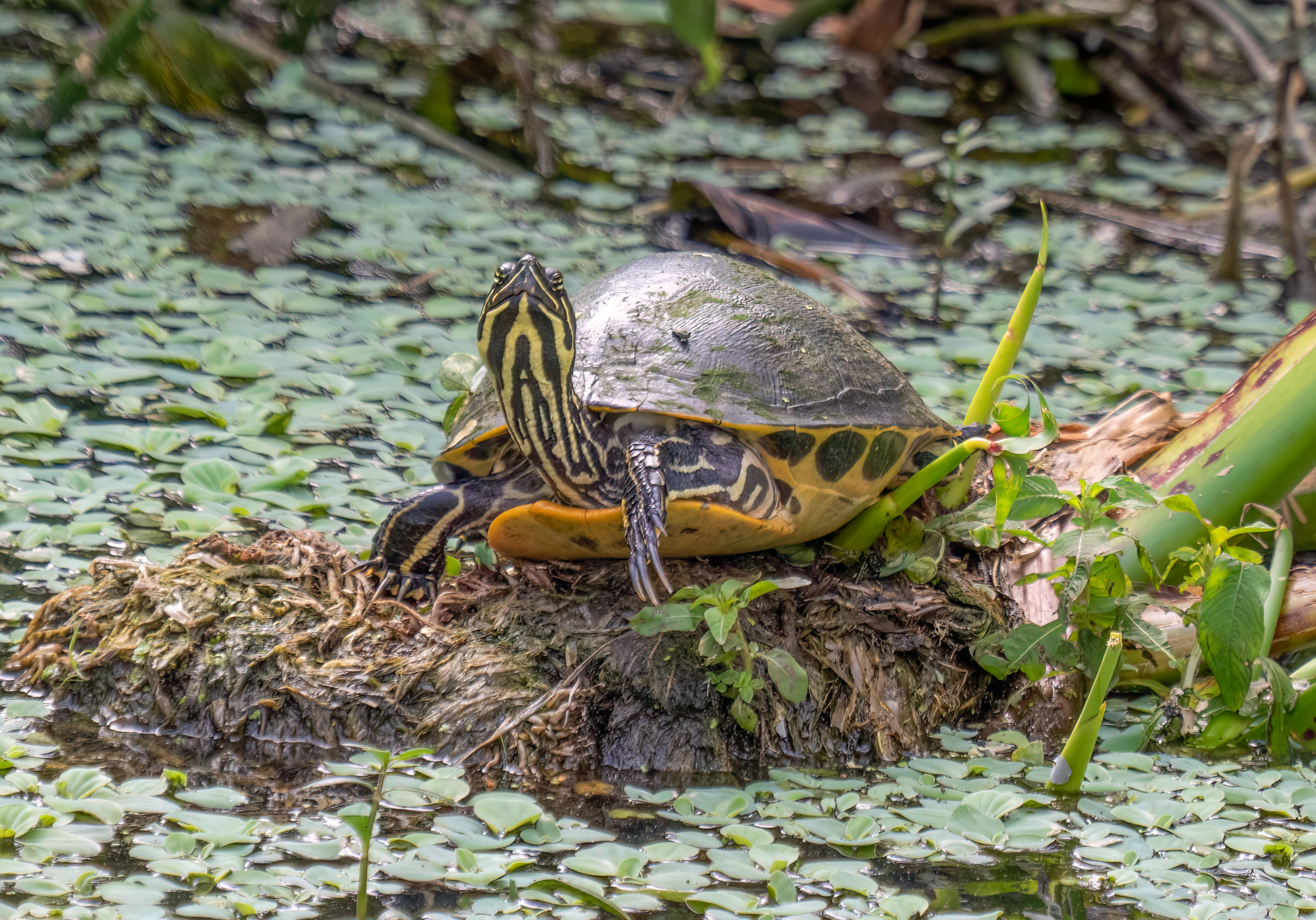
Peninsula Cooter basking

== Distribution ==
The species is widespread in peninsular Florida. It can be found in rivers, ponds, and lakes.
