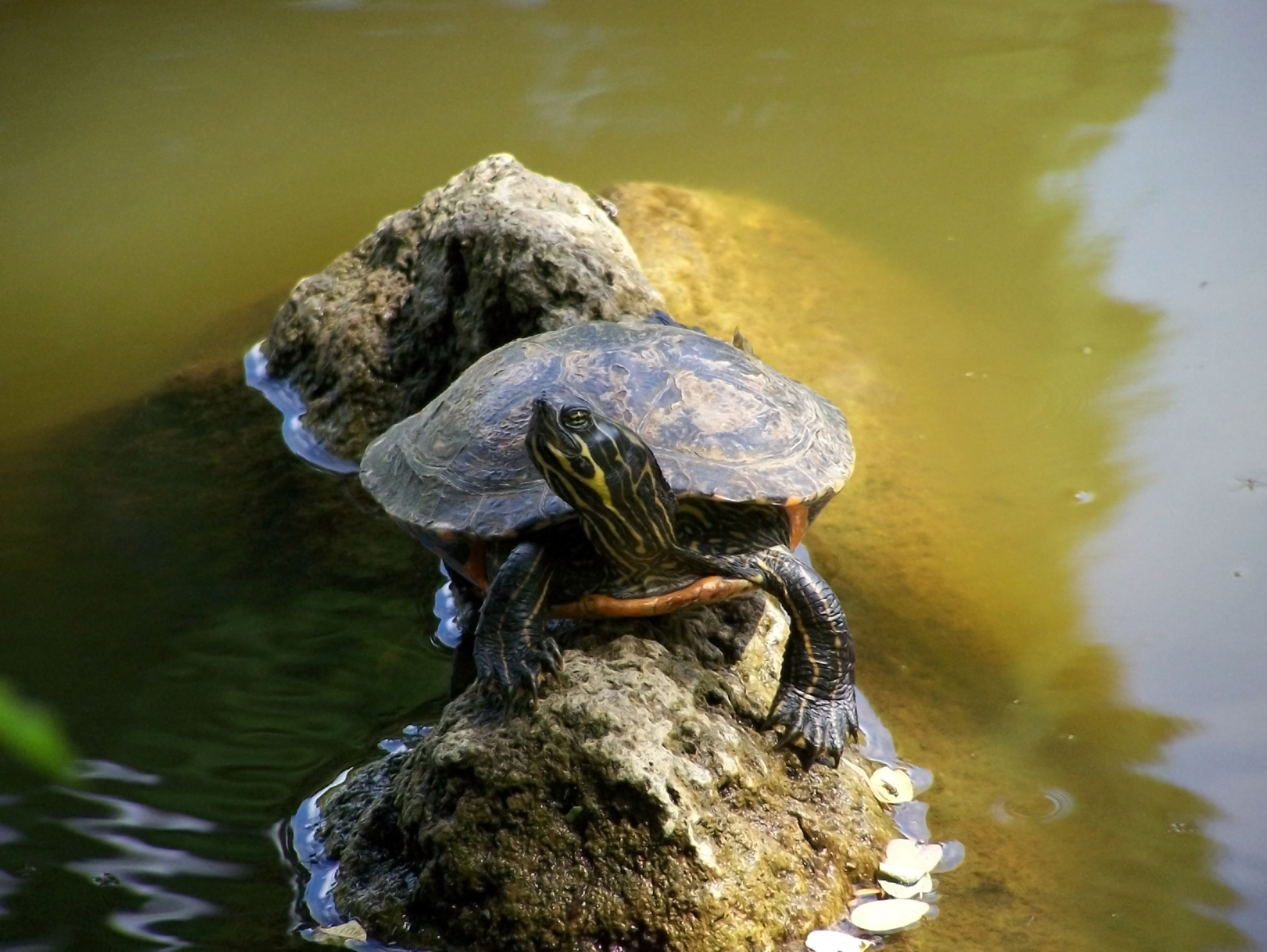

Scientific classification
- Kingdom: Animalia
- Phylum: Chordata
- Class: Reptilia
- Order: Testudines
- Suborder: Cryptodira
- Family: Emydidae
- Genus: Pseudemys
- Species: P. concinna
- Subspecies: P. c. concinna

Trinomial name
- Pseudemys concinna concinna (Le Conte, 1830)

= Eastern river cooter =

Subspecies of turtle

The eastern river cooter (Pseudemys concinna concinna) is a subspecies of turtle native to the eastern United States, with a smaller population in the midwest. It is found in freshwater habitats such as rivers, lakes, and ponds.

== Taxonomy ==
The eastern river cooter is a subspecies within the species Pseudemys concinna, known as the river cooter. The exact number of subspecies is not determined, but most experts recognize two: P. c. concinna, and P. c. suwanniensis. Sometimes another subspecies, P. c. floridana is recognized, but this is often treated as a separate species.

== Description ==
Eastern river cooters are capable of growing up to 16.5 inches (42 cm). The carapace (upper shell) is typically dark greenish brown usually with a "C" marking facing the posterior. In western populations, the "C" may be reduced and many yellow markings may be present on each scute. The background color is reddish brown, unlike the other subspecies, P. c. suwanniensis, which is very dark.

The plastron (bottom shell) is yellow to reddish orange with a dark pattern between scutes that follows the scute seams (this fades with age). This distinguishes it from P. floridana, which lacks the dark marks. The stripe down the hind foot is also a major characteristic, and P. suwanniensis can be distinguished by its lack of color on the legs. Females tend to grow larger than males, and have a smaller tail and more convex plastron.

One particular distinctive feature of the eastern river cooter is that they have the ability to breathe underwater through a sac called the cloaca bursae which is based in their tail. This allows them to stay underwater for extended periods of time, and makes their behavior harder to study.

== Habitat and ecology ==
Eastern river cooters prefer areas with flowing water, such as rivers, but will also live in other freshwater habitats. They live in shallow areas with aquatic vegetation, and when in larger numbers, they live in deeper, clear water.

In the wild they feed almost exclusively on aquatic macrophytes and algae. Aquatic plants seem to make up almost 95% of their diets. Younger ones tend to seek a more protein enriched diet such as aquatic invertebrates, crustaceans, and fish. Older turtles may occasionally seek prey as well, but mostly partake of a herbivorous diet.

These turtles can sometimes be found basking in the sun, but are very wary and will quickly retreat into the water if approached. Otherwise, they are difficult to find in the water, which may be due to their ability to breathe while fully submerged. As a result, they are not often seen. In warmer climates, they are active year-round, but are not very active during winter in colder areas.

=== Reproduction ===
Eastern river cooter mating habits are very similar to the red-eared slider. As with the other basking turtles, the males tend to be smaller than females. The male uses his long claws to flutter at the face of the much larger female. Often, the female ignores him. If the female is receptive, she will sink to the bottom of the river and allow the male to mount for mating. If they do mate, after several weeks the female crawls upon land to seek a nesting site. They often cross highways looking for suitable nesting spots. Females will lay between 12 and 20 eggs at a time, close to water. The eggs hatch within 45 to 56 days and the hatchlings will usually stay with the nest through their first winter.

Mating takes place in early spring. Nesting usually occurs from May to June. The female chooses a site with sandy or loamy soil, within 100 ft (30 m) of the river's edge. She looks for a rather open area, with no major obstacles for the future hatchings to negotiate on their way to the river. The nest is dug with the hind feet. She lays 10–25 or more eggs in one or more clutches. Eggs are ellipsoidal, approximately 1.5 inches (4 cm) long. Incubation time is determined by temperature, but averages 90–100 days. Hatchlings generally emerge in August or September. There have been reported instances of late clutches over-wintering and hatching in the spring. A hatchling will have a round carapace, about 1.5 inches (4 cm) diameter, that is green with bright yellow markings.
