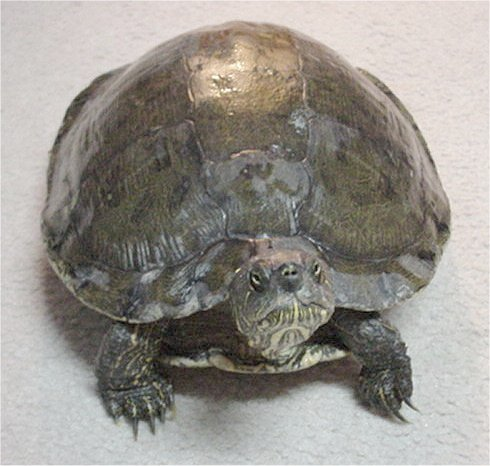

Conservation status
- Least Concern (IUCN 3.1)

Scientific classification
- Kingdom: Animalia
- Phylum: Chordata
- Class: Reptilia
- Order: Testudines
- Suborder: Cryptodira
- Family: Emydidae
- Genus: Pseudemys
- Species: P. texana

Binomial name
- Pseudemys texana Baur, 1893

Synonyms
- Pseudemys texana Baur, 1893; Chrysemys texana Ditmars, 1907; Pseudemys floridana texana Carr, 1938; Pseudemys concinna texana Conant, 1958; Chrysemys concinna texana Smith & Taylor, 1966; Chrysemys concinna texaba Gosławski & Hryniewicz, 1993 (ex errore)

= Texas river cooter =

Species of turtle

The Texas river cooter (Pseudemys texana) is a species of freshwater turtle endemic to the U.S. state of Texas. It is found in the river basins of the Brazos, San Bernard, Colorado, Guadalupe, San Antonio, Nueces, and their tributaries. It is one of three species of cooters (Pseudemys) occurring in Texas, including the Rio Grande cooter (Pseudemys gorzugi) and the river cooter (Pseudemys concinna).

== Description ==
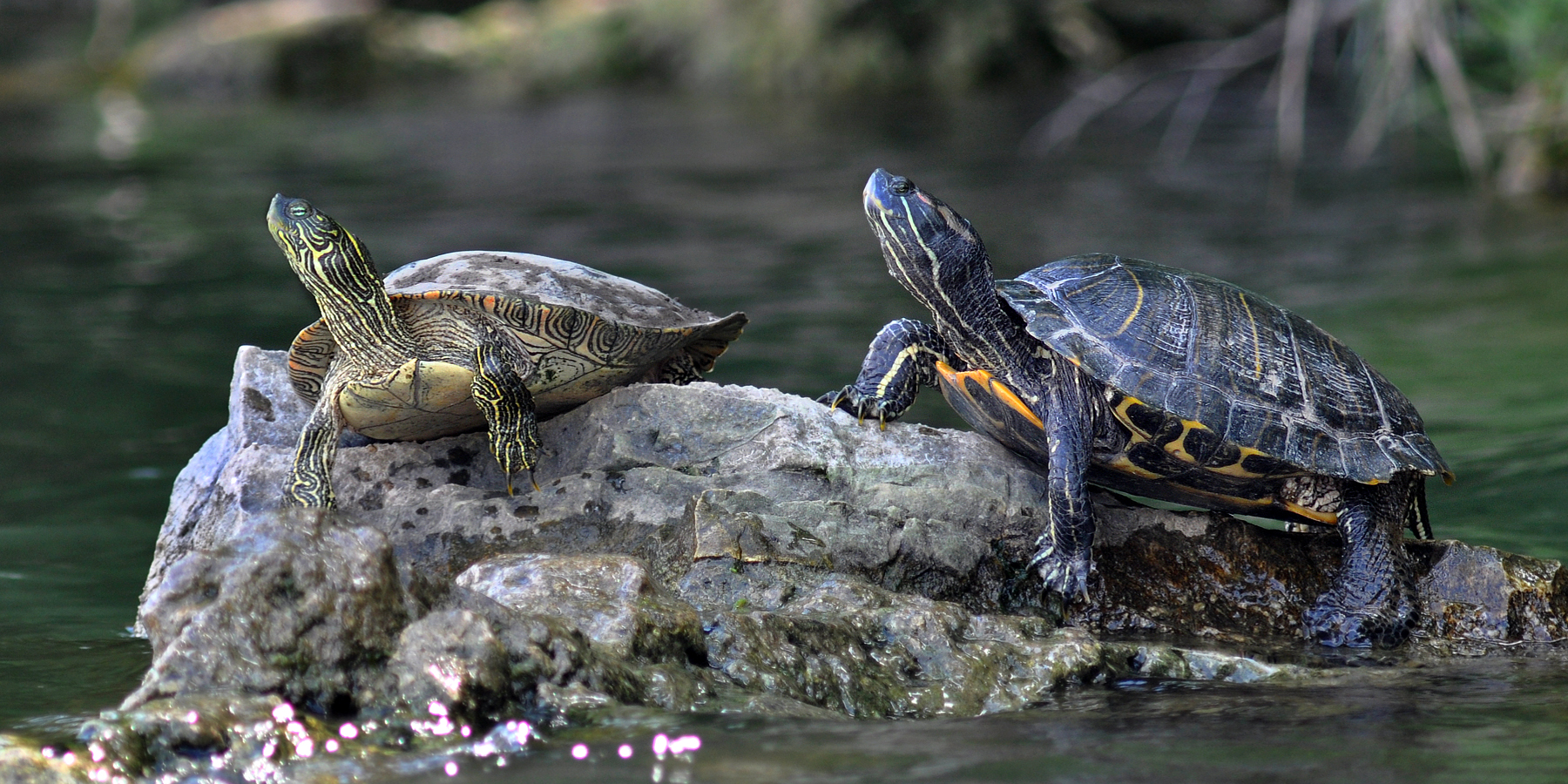
Texas cooter (Pseudemys texana) left, and red-eared slider (Trachemys scripta) right, basking in the Colorado River, Travis County, Texas (12 April 2012).

The Texas river cooter is a relatively large turtle, capable of growing to a shell length of 12+ inches (30.5 cm). They are green in color, with yellow and black markings that fade with age. Males can be distinguished from females by their longer tails, longer claws, and overall smaller size.

== Taxonomy ==
The Texas cooter was once reclassified to a subspecies of the eastern cooter, Pseudemys concinna, but was given full species status in 1991.

== Similar species ==
The red-eared slider (Trachemys scripta elegans) shares its range and habits, but can easily be distinguished from the Texas cooter by red patches on either side of its head. Various species of map turtle can also look much like juvenile Texas cooters.
