= Bjorndal (surname) =

Bjorndal is a surname. Notable people with the surname include:

- Arne Bjørndal (1882–1965), Norwegian musician and folklorist
- Karen Bjorndal, American biologist
- Magnus Bjorndal (1899–1971), American engineer and inventor
- Martin Tore Bjørndal (1944–2015), Norwegian diplomat
- Trond Bjørndal (born 1969), Norwegian footballer and manager
