= Eduard Vallory =

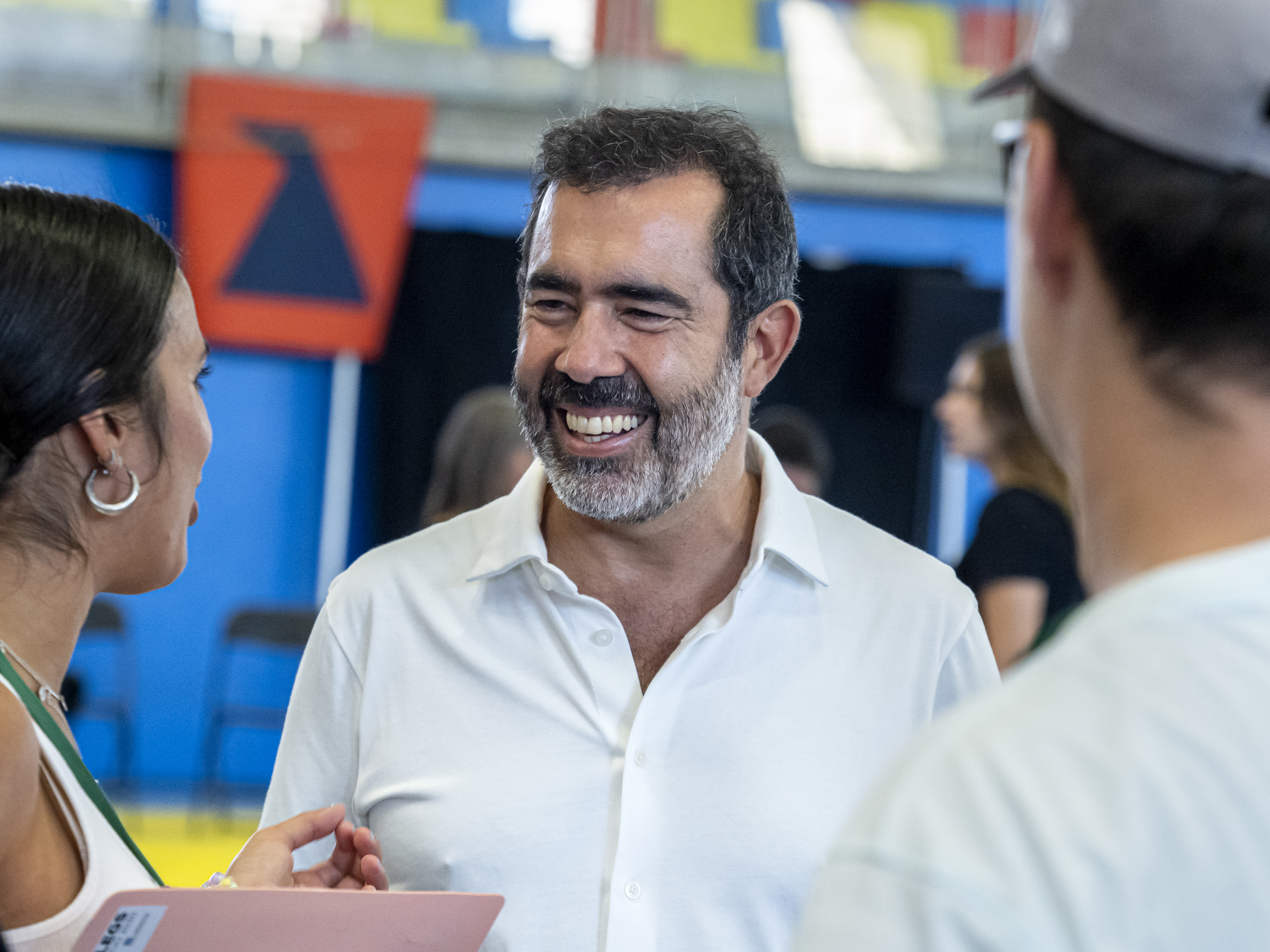

Eduard Vallory (born in Barcelona, 1971) is a Catalan social analyst and change manager. He is the Director of the Barcelona Institute of Science and Technology (BIST), the institution of scientific cooperation between seven Catalan frontier research centres of which it is composed.

Vallory was the first director of the Barcelona Graduate School of Economics (now called the Barcelona School of Economics) from 2006–12.

== Background ==
He is the author of the first academic research at global level on the World Scouting movement. The research was published in the 2012 book World Scouting: Educating for Global Citizenship.

He is also the current Chairman of CATESCO (formerly UNESCOCAT, the Center for UNESCO of Catalonia, an organization with Consultative Status to the United Nations Economic and Social Council), from which in 2016 he launched the three-years alliance for education change "Escola Nova 21", which mobilised more than half a thousand Catalan schools in a participatory project to change learning along the lines of Sustainable Development Goal 4. Dr. Vallory is member of the Education in Advanced Teaching Advisory Board of the University of the People.

== Published works ==
- Vallory, Eduard (2012). World Scouting: Educating for Global Citizenship. Palgrave MacMillan. ISBN 978-1137012067.
- Vallory, Eduard (2009). "Status Quo Keeper or Social Change Promoter? The Double Side of World Scouting's Citizenship Education". In Nelson Block; Tammy Proctor (eds.). Scouting Frontiers: Youth and Scout Movement’s First Century. Cambridge Scholars Publishing. ISBN 978-1443804509.
- Vallory, Eduard (2019). "The history of youth work: Pan-European and transational youth organisations". In Howard Williamson; Tanya Basarab (eds.). World Scouting: A Century of Work for Youth Empowerment. Vol. 7. Council of Europe. ISBN 978-92-871-8965-3.
- Vallory, Eduard (2020). "Preparing Teachers For the Schools We Have or For the Schools We Want? Challenges and Changes in Catalonia (Spain)". In Lauren Lefty; James Fraser (eds.). Teaching the World’s Teachers: A History, 1970-2017. Johns Hopkins University Press. ISBN 978-1421438290.
