= Honour (fief) =

In medieval Europe, an honour was a large feudal landholding. The term was first used to indicate that an estate gave its holder honour, dignity and status. and was used in England, Portugal, Hungary and France.

== England ==
In Norman England honours were granted to a tenant-in-chief of the crown centred on a caput baroniae - usually a castle which acted as the honour's administrative hub. These estates could comprise dozens or even hundreds of manors, with holdings deliberately dispersed to prevent over-concentration of power, with tenants expected to go to the caput even if in a different county although there was usually a reasonably coherent cluster of holdings near the caput. The court of the honour exercised jurisdiction over all manors within the honour, especially in cases involving tenants owing knight service, and was a key judicial body until the late 13th century. The term also signified the dignity and status associated with such estates, with "on my honour" implying a willingness to pledge them as surety. In medieval England, an ‘honour’ could also be referred to as a ‘lordship’ or a ‘barony’, though the terms were not exact equivalents, reflecting overlapping administrative, judicial, and tenurial functions.

== Portugal ==
In the Kingdom of Portugal, an honra was a form of lordship and administrative division, mainly in the north, that existed until 1834 and was characterised by immunity from royal taxation, independent civil and criminal jurisdiction, and the exclusion of royal officials. Unlike coutos, which were granted by royal charter, honras arose independently through the power of feudal lords, often during the Reconquista, and were later recognised or restricted by the crown through measures such as the Inquirições under King Denis, which distinguished legitimate “old” honras from illegitimate “new” ones. They persisted into the modern era but, by the 19th century, were subject to the general law on lordships, including the Lei Mental, which restricted inheritance to legitimate male heirs.

== Hungary ==
In medieval Hungary, an honour could denote a high office under the crown, such as Palatine, count, royal judge or castellan of a royal castle. The holder - often a baron - was entitled to retain all revenues accruing from the office for personal enrichment and to cover expenses. A baron was not required to perform the duties of the office personally, and could instead use part of the revenue to pay subordinates while residing at court or in his own castle. Honours were held at the king’s pleasure; however, in practice, a baron deprived of one could often expect to be granted another, subject to good conduct.

== France ==
In the Carolingian Empire an honour denoted the public authority of a count within his county. By the 13th century, the term was redefined to mean the titles, estates and revenues of the aristocracy. Holders of honours were obliged to provide knight service to their monarch, proportional to the size of the honour although ecclesiastical honours generally paid monetary instead. Militarily, honours obliged attendance at the ban with one’s arrière-ban, enabling dukes and princes to maintain security through the resources of powerful noble lineages.

In Normandy, from where the term came to England after the Norman Conquest, honours could be partitioned among female heirs, each share owing service proportionate to its portion. The term fell out of use in Normandy after the early 13th century.

== Notes ==
=== Sources ===
- Cartledge, Bryan (2011). The Will to Survive: A History of Hungary. C. Hurst & Co. ISBN 978-1-84904-112-6.
- Cardoso, Augusto-Pedro Lopes (1998-01-01). "Honras e Coutos. O contributo do Livro do Milhão. A Honra de Barbosa e o Couto de Bustelo". Cadernos Vianenses (in Portuguese): 113–148.
- Corédon, Christopher (2004). "Honour". A Dictionary of Medieval Terms and Phrases. Cambridge: D.S. Brewer. p. 157. ISBN 978-1-84384-023-7.
- Hespanha, Antonio Manuel (1982). "Historia das instituições, épocas medieval e moderna (Livro)". www.lexml.gov.br (in Portuguese). pp. 158–160.
- Mulholland, Maureen (2003), "Trials in Manorial Courts in Late Medieval England", in Mulholland, Maureen; Pullan, Brian (eds.), The Trial in History: England and Europe from the Thirteenth to the Seventeenth Century, Manchester University Press, pp. 81–101, ISBN 978-0-7190-6342-8
- Proctor, Tammy M. (2002). "On My Honour: Guides and Souts in Interwar Britain". Transactions of the American Philosophical Society. 92 (2). Philadelphia: American Philosophical Society. doi:10.2307/4144911. ISBN 978-0-87169-922-0. ISSN 0065-9746. JSTOR 4144911.
