= The Windward Road =

1956 book by Archie Carr

The Windward Road: Adventures of a Naturalist on Remote Caribbean Shores
- Author: Archie Carr
- Genre: Non-fiction; Nature Writing; Science Writing
- Publication date: 1956, by Knopf (US); 1957, by Robert Hale (UK)
- Publication place: United States
- Pages: 277
- ISBN: 978-0-8130-0639-0

The Windward Road: Adventures of a Naturalist on Remote Caribbean Shores was written by Archie Carr and originally published in 1956. It is an account of Carr's travels around the Caribbean to study sea turtles and their migratory and behavior patterns, especially Kemp's ridley, a species about which little was known at the time. This book led to the formation of The Brotherhood of the Green Turtle, which later became the Caribbean Conservation Corporation, and is now known as the Sea Turtle Conservancy. It was awarded the 1957 John Burroughs Medal for nature writing, which is awarded annually by the American Museum of Natural History. The chapter entitled "The Black Beach", originally published in Mademoiselle, won a 1956 O. Henry Award.

The book was adapted into a 1969 episode of Walt Disney's Wonderful World of Color entitled “Solomon, the Sea Turtle” and was narrated by Sebastian Cabot.
