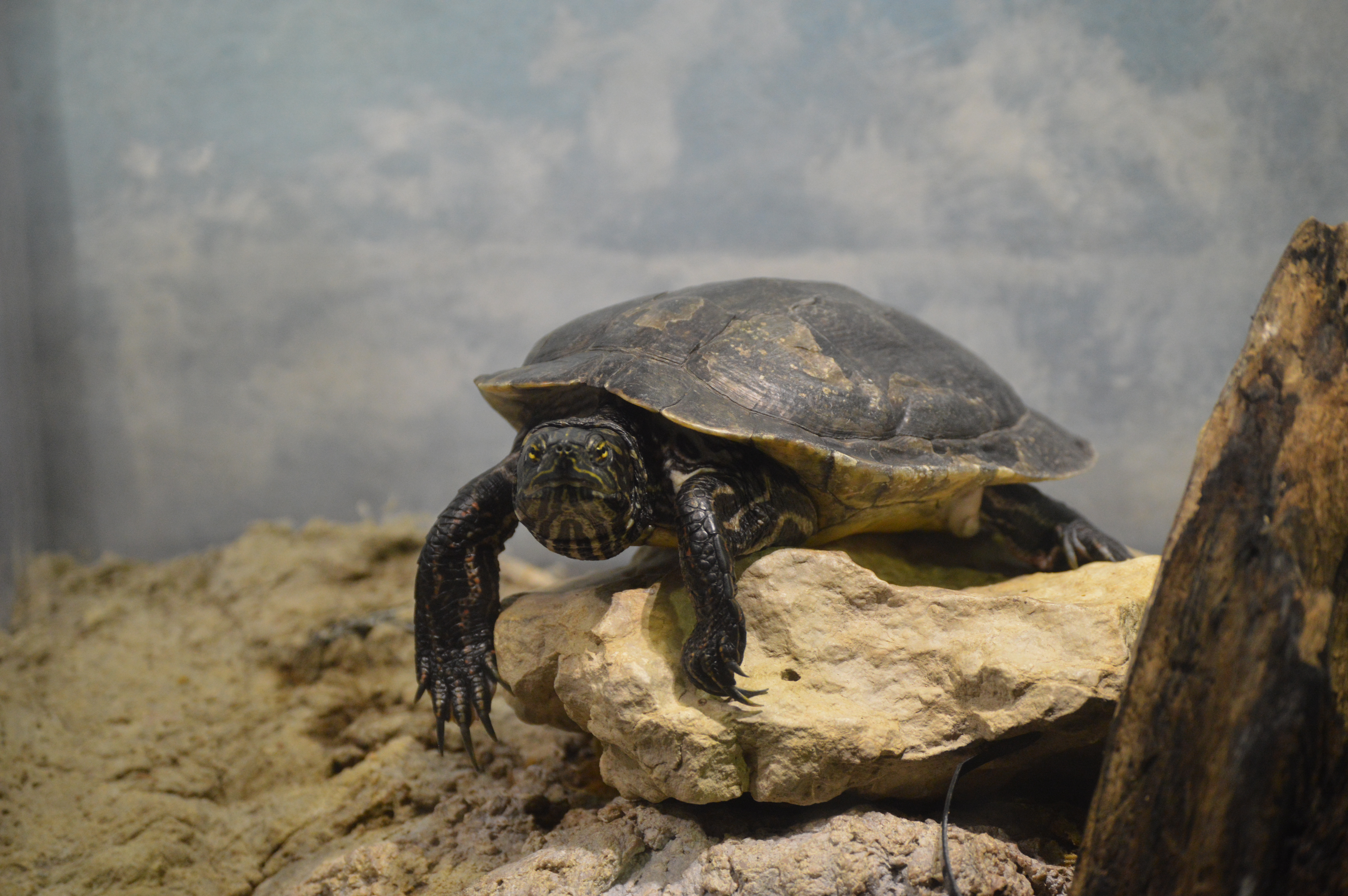
- Rio Grande Cooter at the Fort Worth Zoo in Texas
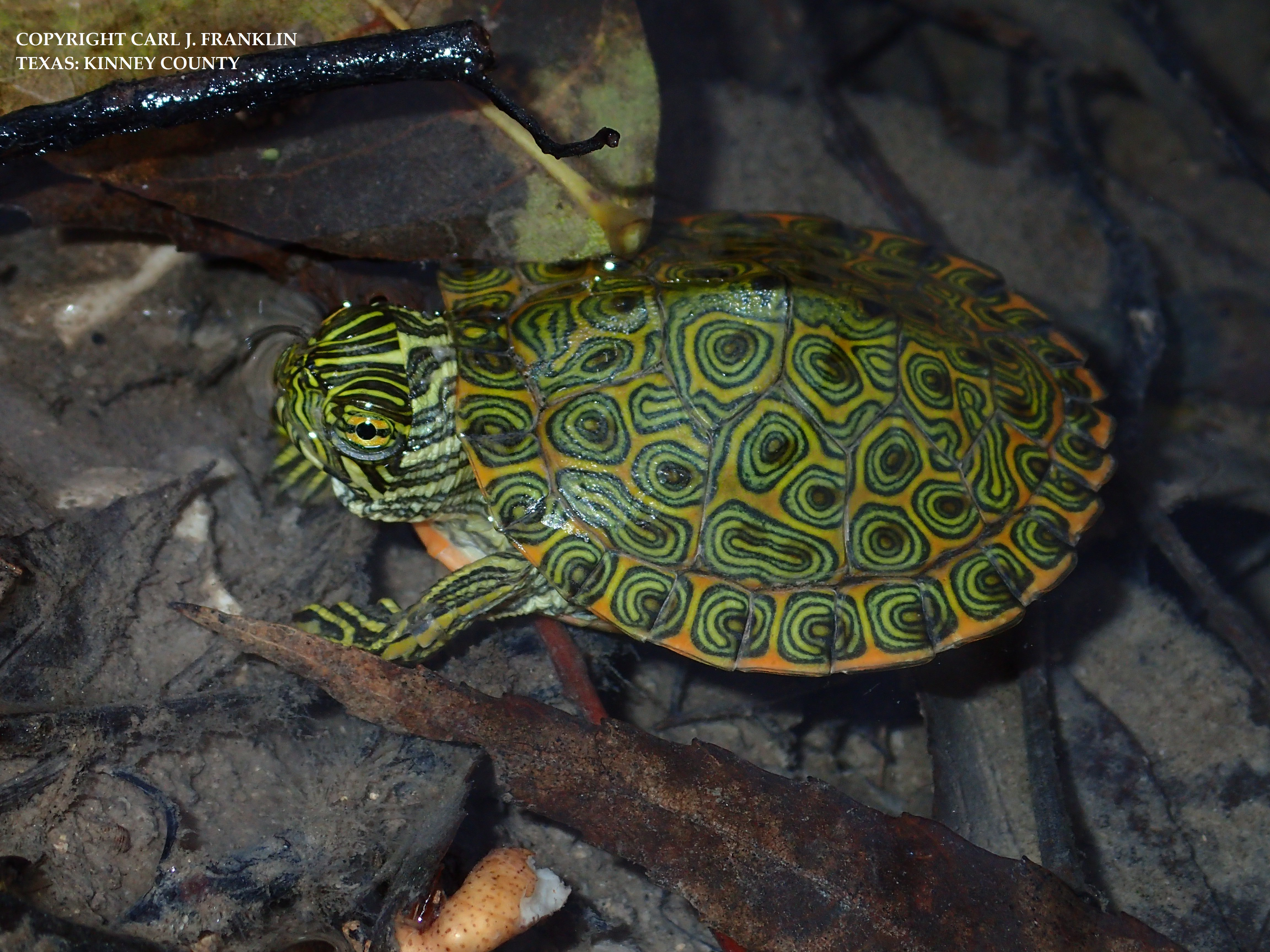
- A baby Rio Grande Cooter from Kinney County, Texas

Conservation status
- Near Threatened (IUCN 3.1)

Scientific classification
- Kingdom: Animalia
- Phylum: Chordata
- Class: Reptilia
- Order: Testudines
- Suborder: Cryptodira
- Family: Emydidae
- Genus: Pseudemys
- Species: P. gorzugi

Binomial name
- Pseudemys gorzugi Ward, 1984

Synonyms
- Pseudemys concinna gorzugi Ward, 1984; Pseudemys gorzugi — Ernst, 1990

= Rio Grande cooter =

Species of turtle

The Rio Grande cooter (Pseudemys gorzugi) is a species of turtle in the family Emydidae. The species is native to northeastern Mexico and the adjacent southwestern United States.

== Geographic range ==
The Rio Grande cooter is found in the Rio Grande drainage of Mexico (Chihuahua, Coahuila, Nuevo León, Tamaulipas), New Mexico, and Texas. In the Texas portion of the Pecos River, an approximately 390 kilometer distributional gap exists from Loving and Reeves counties into Crockett County, possibly due to unsuitable conductivity levels. A record from near the San Saba River in Menard County, Texas has been confirmed as erroneous.

== Habitat ==
The preferred natural habitat of P. gorzugi is freshwater wetlands, at altitudes of 259–1,082 m (850–3,550 ft).

== Reproduction ==
Female P. gorzugi lay one to two clutches per year, with clutches ranging from 5–17 eggs.

== Diet ==
Pseudemys gorzugi are omnivorous, but the relative importance of animal and plant food items varies across populations, sexes, and age groups.

== Etymology ==
The specific name, gorzugi, is in honor of George R. Zug, the Curator of Amphibians and Reptiles at the National Museum of Natural History.
