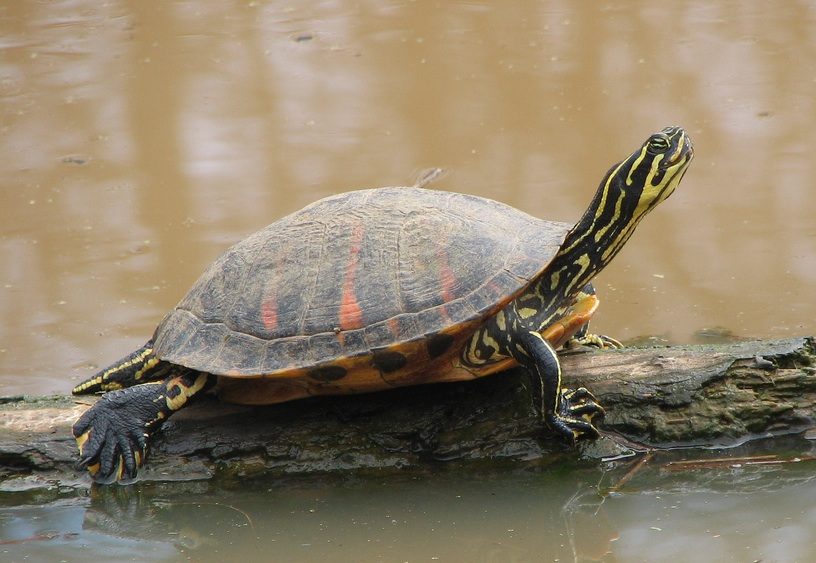
- Pseudemys nelsoni

Conservation status
- Least Concern (IUCN 3.1)

Scientific classification
- Kingdom: Animalia
- Phylum: Chordata
- Class: Reptilia
- Order: Testudines
- Suborder: Cryptodira
- Family: Emydidae
- Genus: Pseudemys
- Species: P. nelsoni

Binomial name
- Pseudemys nelsoni Carr, 1938

Synonyms
- ? Deirochelys floridana O.P. Hay, 1908; ? Trachemys jarmani O.P. Hay, 1908; Pseudemys nelsoni Carr, 1938; Pseudemys rubriventris nelsoni — Mertens, 1951; Chrysemys (Pseudemys) nelsoni — McDowell, 1964; Chrysemys rubriventris nelsoni — Obst, 1983

= Florida red-bellied cooter =

Species of turtle

The Florida red-bellied cooter or Florida redbelly turtle (Pseudemys nelsoni) is a species of turtle in the family Emydidae. The species is native to the southeastern United States.

== Etymology ==
The specific name, nelsoni, is in honor of American biologist George Nelson (born 1873).

== Geographic distribution ==
Pseudemys nelsoni is native to Florida, and southern Georgia. Fossils of P. nelsoni have also been found along the coast of South Carolina from the Pleistocene Epoch, indicating that the historic range of this species used to extend farther north. Today, its northern counterpart, the Northern Red-bellied Cooter (Psuedemys rubriventris) occupies this region.

== Biology ==
The Florida red-bellied cooter is mainly herbivorous, and can be found in nearly any type of aquatic habitat. It feeds on a variety of aquatic plants including waterweed (Vallisneria and Elodea), duckweed (Lemna and Wolffia), and arrowhead (Sagittaria) species. It has been documented consuming algae as well. Juveniles tend to primarily consume small insects. As juveniles age, they transition to a plant-dominated diet. It reaches particularly high densities in spring runs, and occasionally can be found in brackish water. It appears to have an intermediate salinity tolerance compared to true freshwater forms and the highly specialized terrapin (Malachemys). This species is active year-round and spends a large portion of the day basking on logs. It is noted for sometimes laying its eggs in the nest mounds of alligators. Sex is temperature-dependent with males being born at cooler temperatures and females being born at warmer temperatures with a pivotal temperature of about 28.5 °C (83.3 °F). The Florida red-bellied cooter is closely related to the Peninsula cooter (Pseudemys floridana) and can often be found basking on logs together.

== Description ==
The Florida red-bellied cooter can be distinguished from other similar turtles by its distinctive red-tinged plastron (belly) and two cusps (like teeth) on its upper beak. Like most turtles of the genus Pseudemys, this species is a fairly large river turtle. Straight-line carapace length in mature turtles can range from 20.3 to 37.5 cm (8.0 to 14.8 in). Females, which average 30.5 cm (12.0 in) in carapace length and weigh 4 kg (8.8 lb), are noticeably larger than males, which are around 25 cm (9.8 in) and 1.8 kg (4.0 lb) in mass.

== Export ==
The Florida red-bellied cooter is commonly exported for consumption and the pet trade, with about 50% wild caught individuals and 50% captive bred.

Most of US export statistics (as collected by the World Chelonian Trust in 2002–2005) simply describe exported turtles by the genus, Pseudemys, without identifying the species. They are exported by the million, and are mostly farm-raised.

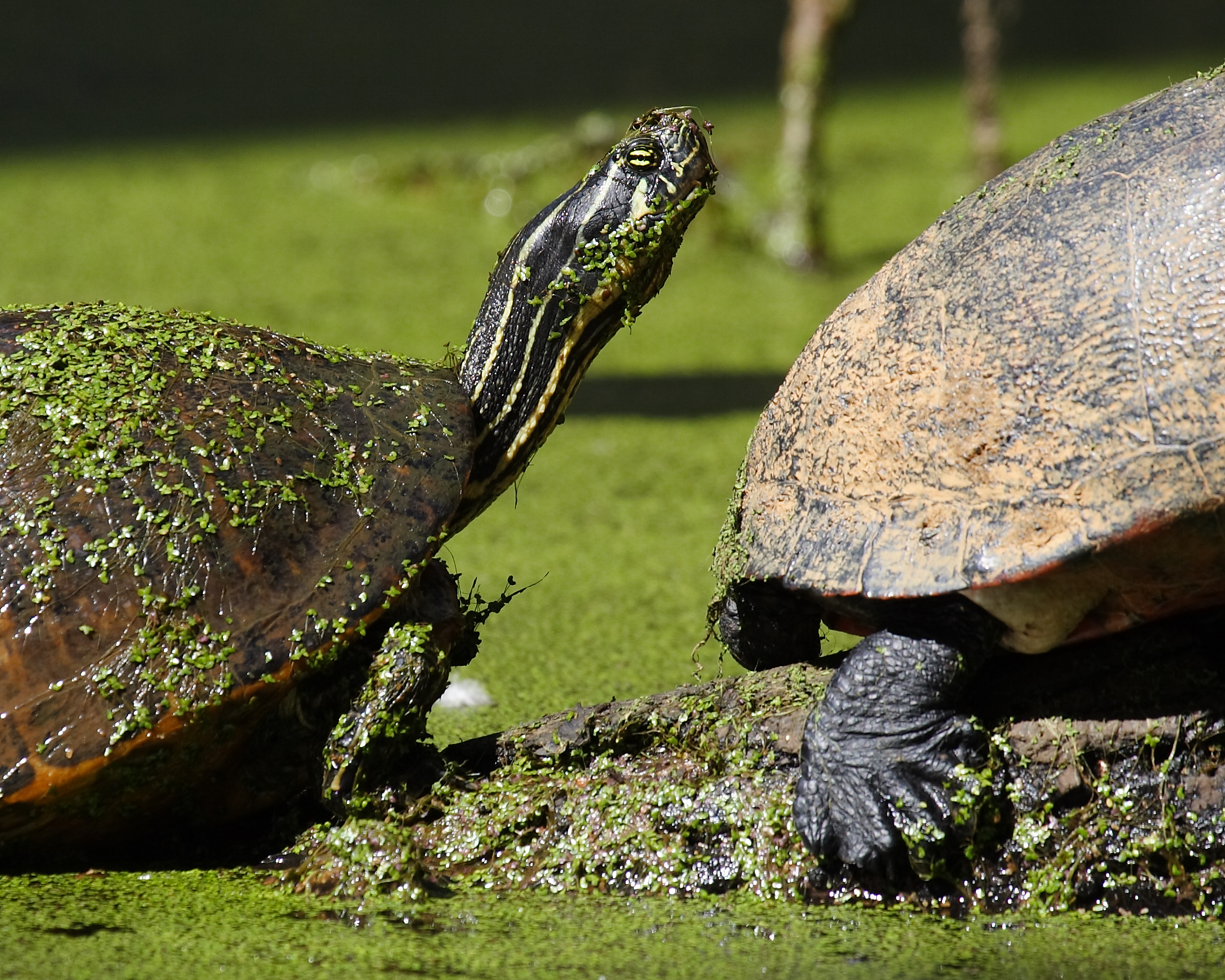
Female Florida red-bellied cooter basking
