= Sea Turtle Conservancy =

US non-profit organization

- Abbreviation: STC
- Formation: 1959; 66 years ago
- Founder: Joshua B. Powers
- Type: Nonprofit
- Tax ID no.: 59-6151069
- Legal status: 501(c)(3)
- Headquarters: Gainesville, Florida
- Website: conserveturtles.org

The Sea Turtle Conservancy (STC), formerly known as Caribbean Conservation Corporation, is an American not-for-profit 501(c)(3) membership organization based in Gainesville, Florida. It was incorporated, based on an earlier informal organization known as The Brotherhood of the Green Turtle, in 1959 by Joshua B. Powers, who was inspired by ecologist Archie Carr's book The Windward Road, which documented threats to sea turtles.

== See also ==
- The Windward Road
- Turtle walk
- Tour de Turtles
