= Tour de Turtles =

Tour de Turtles: A Sea Turtle Migration Marathon, or simply Tour de Turtles, is an annual online migration-tracking event hosted by the Caribbean Conservation Corporation. Endangered sea turtles are monitored using an attached but harmless satellite tracking device. Caribbean Conservation Corporation biologists gather satellite tracking information in order to better understand sea turtle migration patterns. Understanding sea turtle migration patterns would allow for sea turtle conservation groups to lobby for more sea turtle protection in proven areas with higher sea turtle populations. Sea turtles are the participants for the Tour de Turtle marathon. Participating sea turtles are tracked as they race to be the first to complete a 2,620-kilometre (1,628 mi) journey that is estimated to last three months. Tour de Turtles aims to increase awareness about different sea turtle species and the threats to their survival. The turtle to first swim the 1,628 miles wins the marathon.

== Marathon ==
After departing from some of the most important nesting sites in the Western Hemisphere, typically Vero Beach, Florida and Melbourne Beach, Florida, sea turtles will be monitored using Platform Terminal Transmitter (PTT) that send signals via satellite to record their locations and the distances traveled. The data will then be uploaded to interactive maps on the Tour de Turtles website, TourdeTurtles.org. Because the turtles will be released at different times, depending on the species, the distance traveled by each turtle will not be counted until the last turtle is released. This will ensure that the first turtles released do not get a head start in completing the marathon. Each participating sea turtle will have a spot on the "leader board", which will provide an overview of all the turtles' progress. The marathon may end in less than three months, but the program will continue to follow the turtles' progress for up to two years. The first turtle to reach 2,620 km (1,630 mi) will win the marathon. Although there will be only one turtle marathon winner, another sea turtle has the chance to win the Causes Challenge.

== Cause Challenge ==
Tour de Turtles includes a fundraiser to fund the fight against numerous sea turtle threats. Along with the marathon, each turtle is symbolically linked to support a cause for multiple primary sea turtle threats; commercial longline fisheries, invasive species predation, plastic marine debris, marine pollution from oil spills and chemical pollution from coastal development, adult harvest for meat consumption, sea level and temperature rise from climate change, commercial trawl fisheries, sea walls, egg harvest for consumption and native species predation Each turtle is swimming for a cause to raise awareness about each specific threat to sea turtles. The public is encouraged to support a turtle's cause or several causes. The turtle that generates the most support by the conclusion of the race will win the Causes Challenge. All donations made towards Causes have a direct impact on sea turtle conservation.

== How Tour de Turtles helps sea turtles ==
Tour de Turtles empowers audiences with ways to help combat sea turtle threats. This level of community involvement and public support has a significantly positive impact on sea turtle populations around the world. Using information gained through Tour de Turtles, the public will understand how to fight and eliminate human-caused threats to sea turtles. The scientific community also benefits All data collected will be applied to research about these endangered species and their little-known migratory patterns.

== Participating in Tour de Turtles ==
Audiences can view photos, watch videos, learn about the turtles' causes, see individual migration-tracking maps and hear periodic interviews with each marathoner through the biography of each participating sea turtle. People participate through adopting a swimmer to support a Cause. Tour de Turtles also provides a free Educator's Manual that teachers use to incorporate sea turtles and conservation themes into lesson plans.

== Satellite tracking technology ==
Satellite telemetry involves following an object on the Earth's surface through the use of orbiting satellites. Researchers at CCC use this technology to track the migratory patterns of sea turtles in the Caribbean and the Atlantic Ocean. Satellite telemetry allows researchers to obtain up-to-date location data every time the sea turtle rises to the surface for air. A Platform Terminal Transmitter (PTT) is attached to the back of a sea turtle. The PTT sends a signal full of information to an orbiting satellite each time the turtle surfaces. The satellite re-transmits the data to a receiving station on Earth. Researchers can then access this information through their computer. Satellite transmitters can be attached several different ways. For hard-shell turtles, such as Green turtles, Loggerhead or Hawksbills, the Marine Epoxy Method or the Fiberglass and Resin Method are used. Both methods are safe for the turtles, neither hurting their shells nor restricting their movements in the ocean. Transmitters are designed to safely fall off the turtles after about a year and a half. Leatherback turtles, which lack a hard shell, require a different method because of their size and the texture of their carapace. A harness that goes over the shell is used to secure a transmitter. The harness tends to last longer than the epoxy or fiberglass methods, allowing researchers to track leatherbacks for up to two years before the harness falls off harmlessly.

== See also ==
- Endangered species
