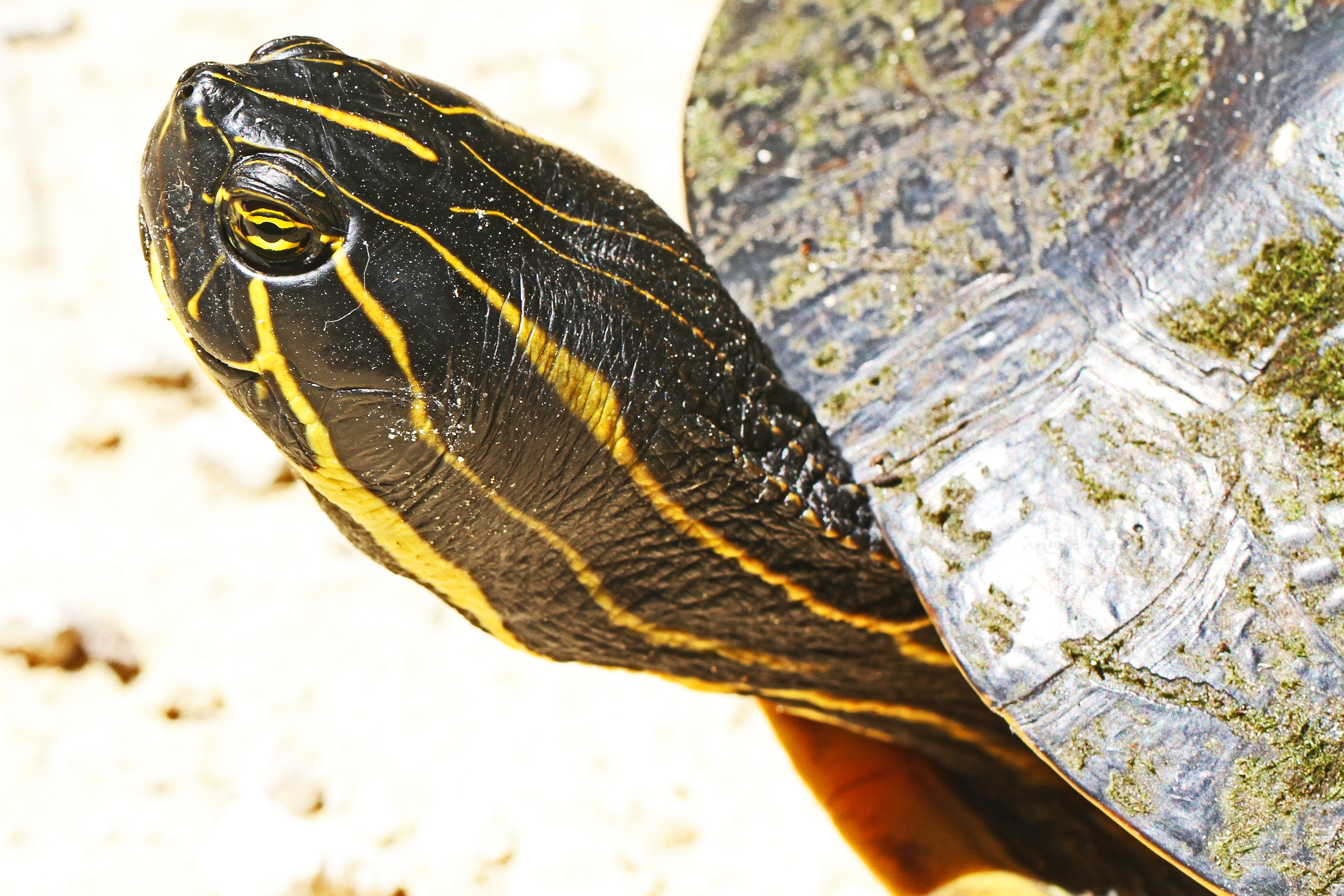
- Suwannee cooter

Conservation status
- Vulnerable (NatureServe)

Scientific classification
- Domain: Eukaryota
- Kingdom: Animalia
- Phylum: Chordata
- Class: Reptilia
- Order: Testudines
- Suborder: Cryptodira
- Superfamily: Testudinoidea
- Family: Emydidae
- Genus: Pseudemys
- Species: P. concinna
- Subspecies: P. c. suwanniensis

Trinomial name
- Pseudemys concinna suwanniensis Carr, 1937

= Suwannee cooter =

Subspecies of turtle

The Suwannee cooter (Pseudemys concinna suwanniensis) is a subspecies of turtle in the genus Pseudemys. It is a subspecies of the river cooter. The species is endemic to Florida, including in the Suwannee River.

== Conservation status ==
P. c. suwanniensis was hunted for its meat, but is now protected.

== Appearance ==
The carapace of P. c. suwanniensisis black in color, with yellow markings. The plastron is light orange or yellow with black markings. Adults can reach 17 inches (43.7 centimeters) in carapace length.

== Diet ==
The diet of P. c. suwanniensis mainly consists of aquatic plants.
