= Karen Bjorndal =

American biologist

Karen Anne Bjorndal
- Born: Berkeley, California
- Spouse: Alan Bolton

Academic background
- Education: BA., biology, Occidental College; PhD., 1979, University of Florida
- Thesis: Nutrition and grazing behavior of the green turtle, Chelonia mydas, a seagrass herbivore (1979)

Academic work
- Discipline: Zoology
- Sub-discipline: Sea turtles
- Institutions: University of Florida

Karen Anne Bjorndal is an American biologist focusing in nutritional ecology, with an emphasis on vertebrate herbivores and the biology of sea turtles. She is a Distinguished Professor of Biology at the University of Florida and Director of the Archie Carr Center for Sea Turtle Research (ACCSTR).

== Education ==
After her junior year at Occidental College, Bjorndal spent six months on the Galápagos Islands studying land iguanas. Upon her return, and completion of her degree, Bjorndal was convinced she wanted to write her PhD thesis on sea turtles. However, Dr Archie Carr refused to accept doctoral students who wished to focus on sea turtles as he felt it was too broad of a topic for a dissertation. After camping outside his house, penning letters, and digitizing his data, Bjorndal convinced Carr to Chair her Doctoral Committee. She worked alongside Carr after publishing her thesis Nutrition and grazing behavior of the green turtle, Chelonia mydas, a seagrass herbivore and took over his efforts at the Centre for Sea Turtle Research once he died.

== Career ==
In 1987, Bjorndal was promoted to director of the Archie Carr Center for Sea Turtle Research at the University of Florida.

== Recognition ==
In 2023, Bjorndal was elected as a Fellow of the American Association for the Advancement of Science.
