= Joseph P. Ward =

American historian and author

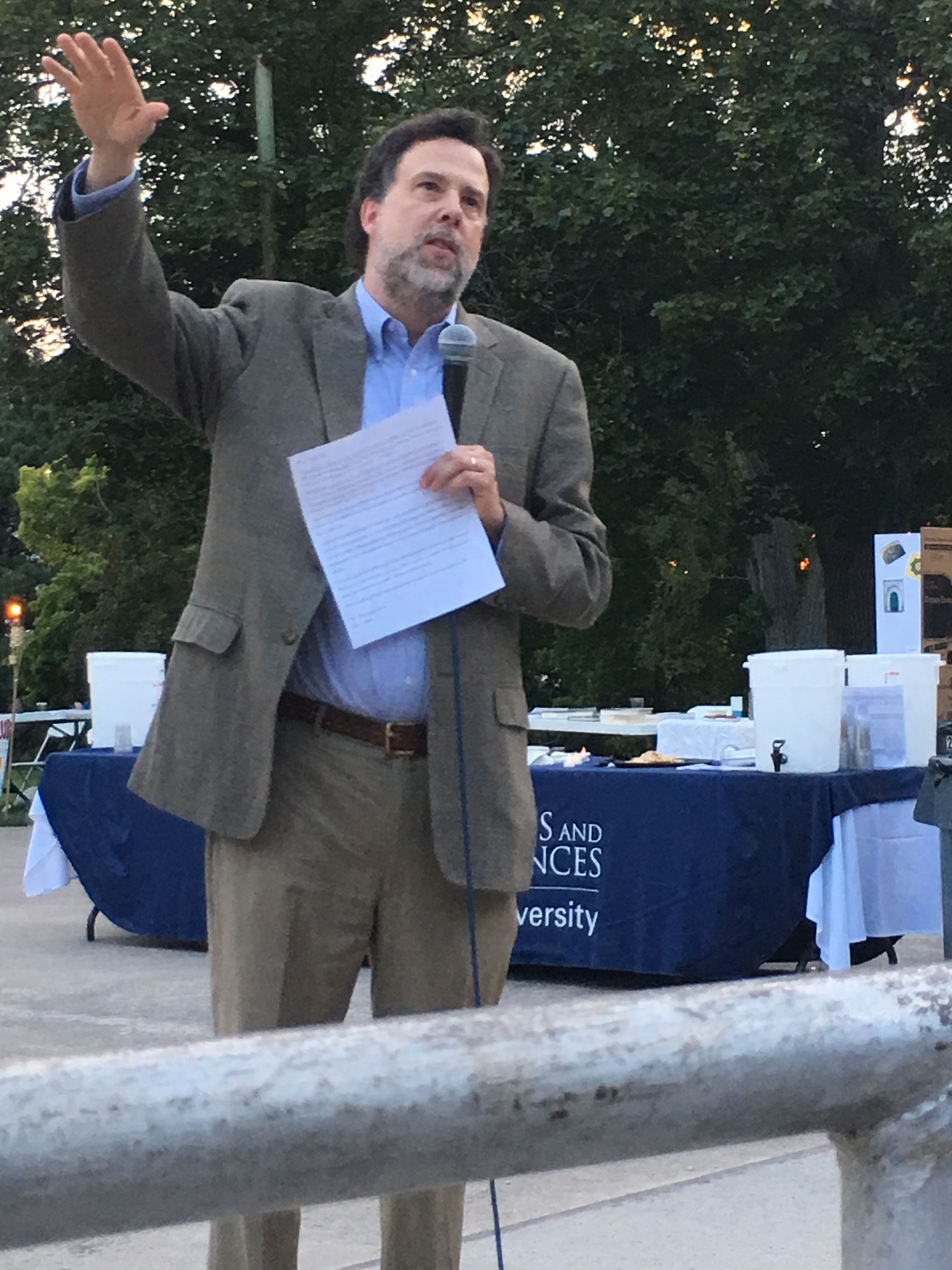
- Dean Joe Ward presents at the 2016 Light on A Hill event for CHaSS.
- Spouse: Sue Grayzel

Academic background
- Education: Stanford University (MA, PhD)

Academic work
- Discipline: Historian
- Sub-discipline: English society
- Institutions: University of California, Davis; Wayne State University; University of Mississippi; Utah State University

Joseph P. Ward is an American historian and author who is currently dean of the College of Arts & Sciences at Utah State University.

== Biography ==
Joseph Ward grew up in Southern New England, seeing massive upheaval from the loss of manufacturing jobs, a change he later credited for his interest in history. Ward earned his Bachelor of Arts in history at University of Chicago and received a masters and a doctorate in history from Stanford University. In 2017 he was made the head of the search committee for Utah State's next provost, a position previously held by current president Noelle E. Cockett. That search eventually led to hiring of Frank Galey.

== Career ==
- Visiting Instructor, Department of History, University of California, Davis, April–June 1992.
- Assistant Professor, Department of History, Wayne State University, August 1992 – July 1998.
- Professor, Chair, Arch Dalrymple III Department of History, University of Mississippi, January 1997 – July 2016.
- Dean, College of Humanities and Social Sciences, Utah State University, July 2016 – 2025
- Dean, College of Arts and Sciences, Utah State University, since July 2025

== Works ==
- Muriel C. McClendon; Joseph P. Ward; Michael MacDonald (1999). Protestant Identities: Religion, Society, and Self-Fashioning in Post-Reformation England. Stanford University Press. ISBN 978-0-8047-3611-4.
- Robert O. Bucholz; Joseph P. Ward (July 2012). London: A Social and Cultural History, 1550-1750. Cambridge University Press. ISBN 978-0-521-89652-8.
- Ward, Joseph P. (March 2013). Culture, Faith, and Philanthropy: Londoners and Provincial Reform in Early Modern England. Palgrave Macmillan. ISBN 978-1-137-06551-3.
- Ward, Joseph P. (1997). Metropolitan Communities: Trade Guilds, Identity, and Change in Early Modern London. Stanford University Press. ISBN 978-0-8047-2917-8.

== Awards ==
- Donald R. Cole Excellence in Promoting Inclusiveness in Graduate Education Award - 2006 University of Mississippi

== Personal life ==
Ward is married to Sue Grayzel, another American academic historian.
