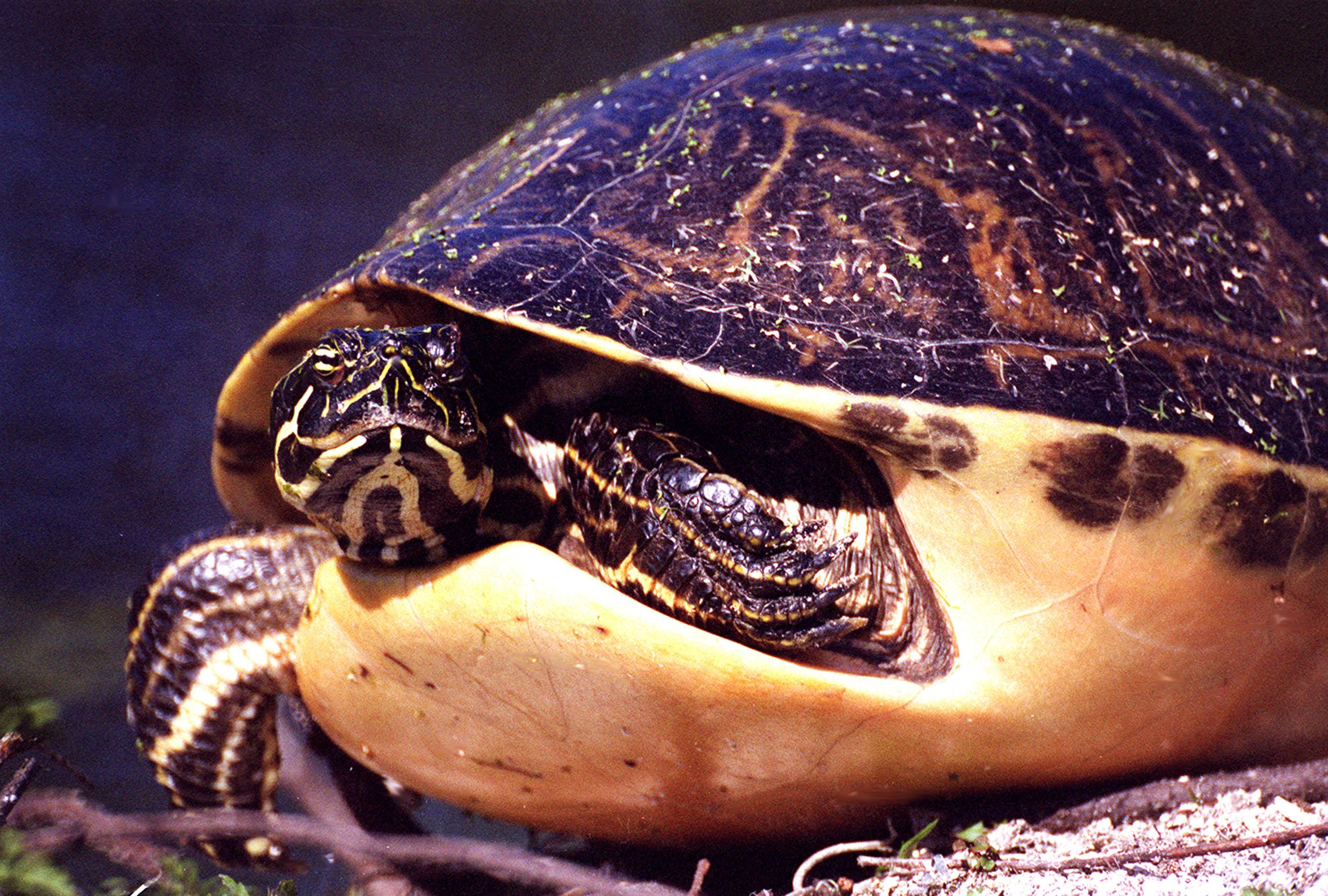

Scientific classification
- Kingdom: Animalia
- Phylum: Chordata
- Class: Reptilia
- Order: Testudines
- Suborder: Cryptodira
- Family: Emydidae
- Subfamily: Deirochelyinae
- Genus: Pseudemys; Gray, 1856

= Pseudemys =

Pseudemys Temporal range: Middle Miocene to present

Genus of turtles

Pseudemys is a genus of large, herbivorous, freshwater turtles of the eastern United States and adjacent northeast Mexico. They are often referred to as cooters, which stems from kuta, the word for turtle in the Bambara and Malinké languages, brought to America by enslaved people from Africa.

== Etymology ==
The generic name Pseudemys is derived from the Greek words, pseudes meaning false or misleading, and emydos a freshwater turtle, implying a resemblance to, but not included in the genus Emys. The trivial names, or specific epithets, of five of the species are toponyms, named for places where the species were first discovered including, the Florida peninsular (P. peninsularis), the Suwannee River (P. suwanniensis), Alabama (P. alabamensis), Florida (P. floridana), and Texas (P. texana). Two are patronyms, or eponyms, honoring prominent zoologists, George Robert Zug, curator of Amphibians and Reptiles at the Smithsonian, National Museum of Natural History (P. gorzugi), and George Nelson, botanist, zoologist, and Chief Taxidermist at the Museum of Comparative Zoology, Harvard (P. nelsoni). The other specific epithets are derived from Latin: P. concinna, from concinnus meaning neat, trim, or skillfully joined, likely in reference to the relatively smooth, stream-lined shell, or possibly the colors and patterns on the carapace; and P. rubriventris, from rubidus reddish, and venter belly, referring the red color of the plastron.

== Taxonomy ==
The genus Pseudemys has an extensive, complicated, and at times contentious taxonomic history. Historically the genus has been intertwined with other genera, at times included in other genera or having members of other genera include in it (Chrysemys, Clemmys, Emys, Ptychemys, and Trachemys), as well as the recognition of a number of additional subspecies well into the third quarter of the 20th century. As recently as 1984 one reviewer of the genus called the chrysemyd complex "a taxonomic morass". Another wrote "Pseudemys has long been recognized as something of a taxonomic quagmire, and has been the subject of a confusing litany of taxonomic arrangements." By the last decade of the 20th century, taxonomist were largely in agreement on a monophyletic genus and the recognition of nine taxa. However the relationships and status of some of the taxa in the genus, as species or subspecies, has been inconsistent. Some have recognized all nine taxa as full species. Two clades, or species groups, are recognized within the genus, the red-bellied cooters (P. alabamensis, P. nelsoni, P. rubriventris) comprising one group (subgenus Ptychemys) and the remaining six species comprising the other group (subgenus Pseudemys).

=== Species ===
Standardized English Name

Alabama red-bellied cooter

River cooter

Coastal plain cooter

Rio Grande cooter

Florida red-bellied cooter

Peninsula cooter

Northern red-bellied cooter

Suwannee cooter

Texas cooter

Seidel (1994)

P. alabamensis Baur, 1893

P. c. concinna (Le Conte, 1830)

P. c. floridana (Le Conte, 1830)

P. gorzugi Ward, 1984

P. nelsoni Carr, 1938

P. peninsularis Carr, 1938

P. rubriventris (Le Conte, 1830)

P. suwanniensis Carr, 1937

P. texana Baur,1893

Jackson (1995)

P. floridana floridana

P. floridana peninsularis

Seidel & Dreslik (1996)

P. concinna floridana

P. peninsularis

P. concinna suwanniensis

Powell et al. (2016)

P. concinna

P. floridana

P. peninsularis

P. suwanniensis

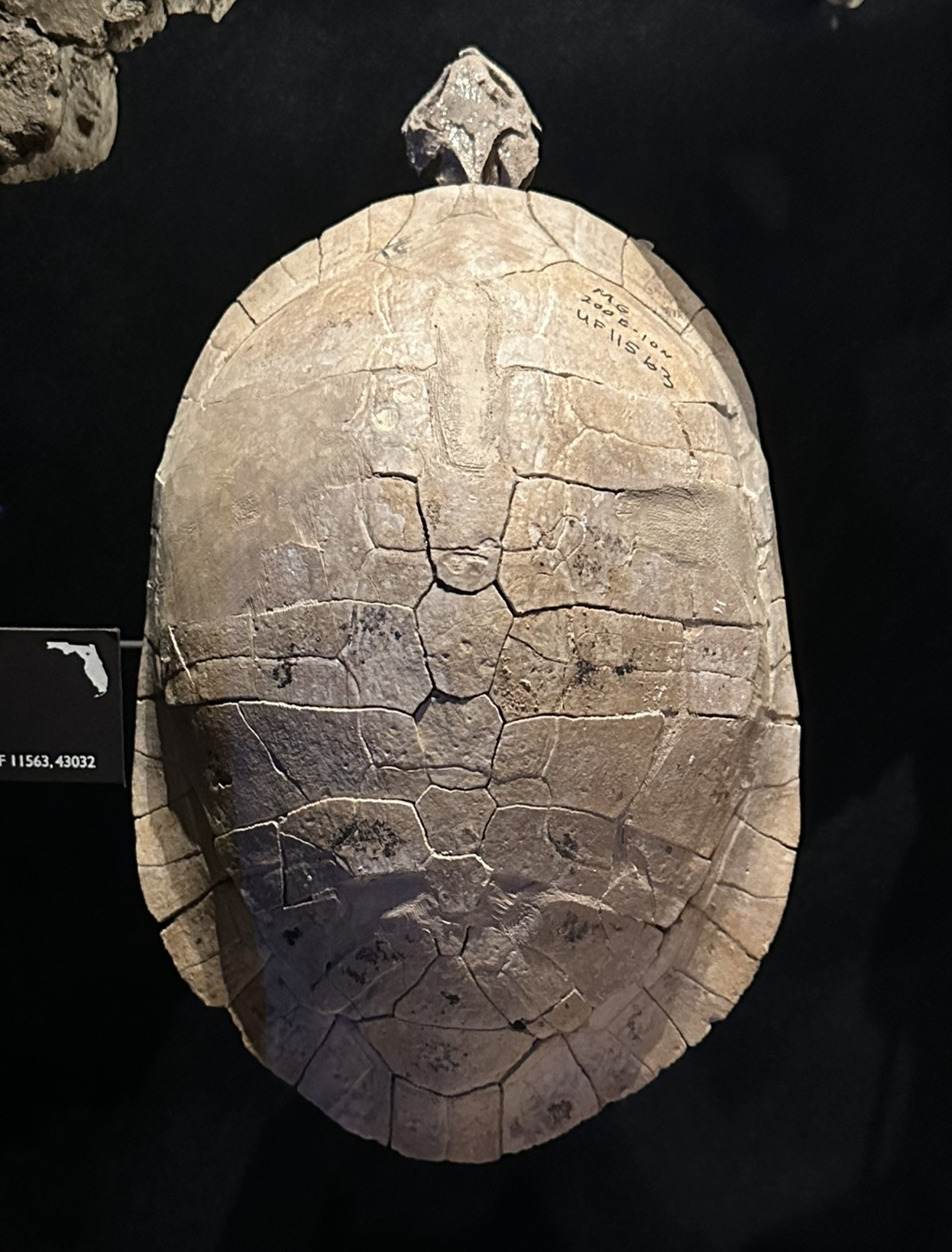
Fossil skeleton of P. williamsi, Florida Museum of Natural History

A study published in 2012 examined nuclear and mitochondrial genes from geographically widespread samples of all nine taxa, but identified only three clades [species], with significant integration between some clades, and stated: "We found little or no evidence supporting the division of Pseudemys into its currently recognized species/subspecies. Rather, our data strongly suggest that the group has been oversplit and contains fewer species than currently recognized." Somewhat confoundedly, the study did not recommend any taxonomic changes, concluding the resolution of Pseudemys will necessitate further analysis with an integrated review of morphology, historical biogeographic data, and extensive geographic sampling with large amounts of molecular (DNA) data.

The following fossil species are also known:

- †Pseudemys caelata Hay, 1908
- †Pseudemys carri Rose & Weaver, 1966
- †Pseudemys idahoensis Gilmore, 1933
- †Pseudemys williamsi Rose & Weaver, 1966

== Description ==
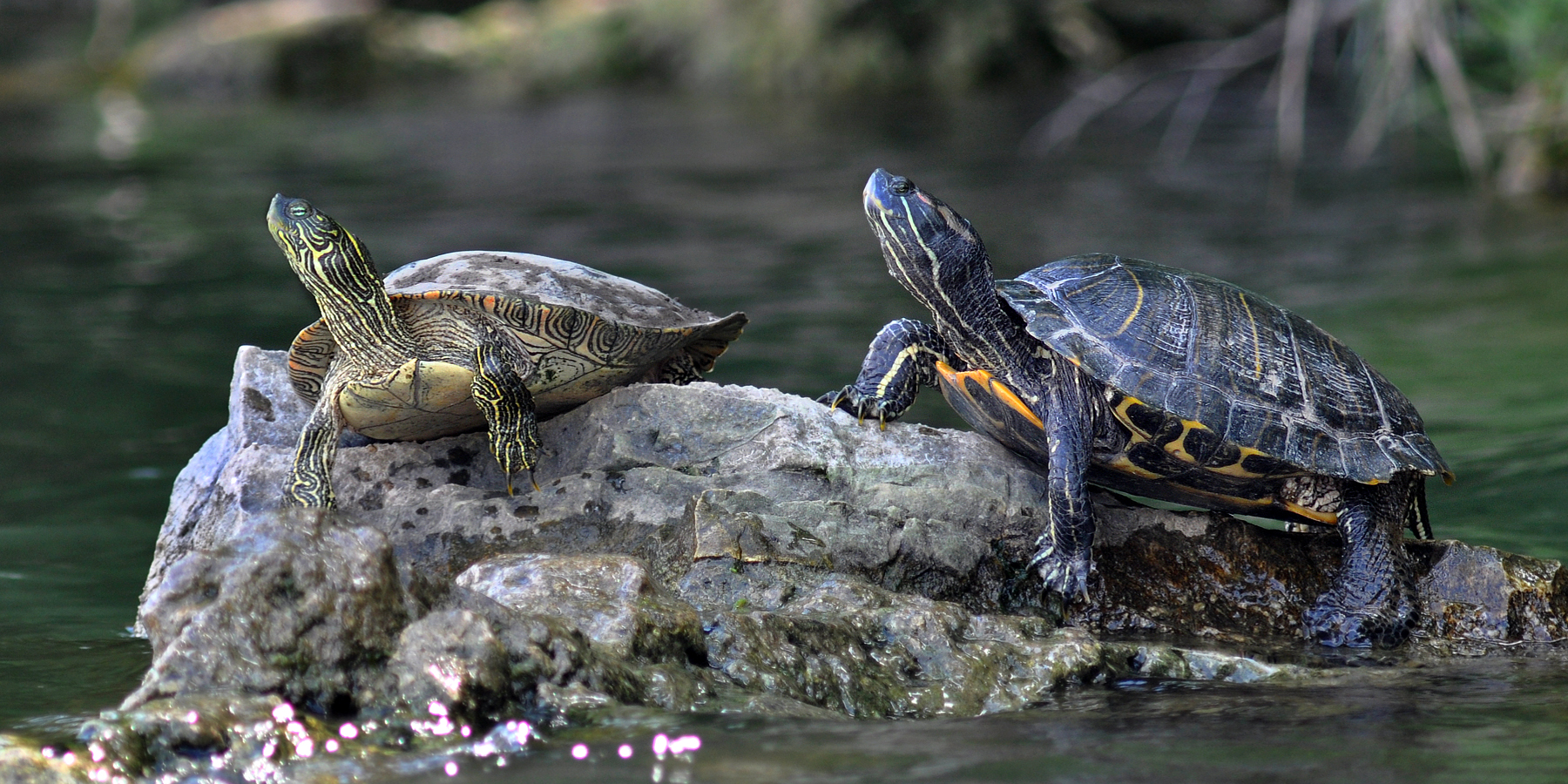
Texas cooter (left) and red-eared slider (right), Travis Co., Texas (12 Apr. 2012)

Members of this genus are among the largest of the Emydidae, capable of attaining carapace lengths of over 16.0 in (40.64 cm) and capable of weighing up to 35 lbs (15.876 kg), although most individuals are far smaller. All are aquatic, spending the majority of their time in lakes, rivers, and ponds where they can easily be seen basking on rocks and logs in sunny weather.

== Distribution ==
The genus Pseudemys is endemic to North America. All but one species are endemic to the USA, predominantly occurring in the Southern United States and peripheral areas of southeast Pennsylvania, southern Ohio, Indiana, Illinois, Missouri and southeast Kansas. The northern red-bellied cooter (Pseudemys rubriventris), ranges north into central New Jersey with some smaller isolated populations in New York and Massachusetts. The westernmost species, the Rio Grande cooter (Pseudemys gorzugi), occurs in the Rio Grande and several of its tributaries on the USA – Mexico border, in Texas and the neighboring Mexican states of Coahuila, Nuevo Leon, and Tamaulipas, following the Pecos River into extreme southeast New Mexico. The greatest diversity is in northern Florida and adjacent areas of southern Georgia and Alabama where six taxa occur.

== Ecology and natural history ==
Diet: As juveniles, Pseudemys are typically omnivorous, feeding on variety of plants as well as sponges, bryozoans, snails, clams, crayfish, and insects such as caddisfly larvae, dobsonfly larvae, dragonfly nymphs, fly and mosquito larvae, aquatic beetles, caterpillars, crickets, and grasshoppers. Tadpoles and very small fish (e. g. darters, Percina) are also included in their diets. Both juveniles and adults will consume carrion on occasion.

The diet shifts to a greater percentage of vegetation as the turtles mature. Adults P. peninsularis are reported to be 90% herbivorous, and adult P. nelsoni, P. rubriventris, and P. suwanniensis are almost exclusively herbivorous. Pseudemys concinna are known to retain a greater degree of animal prey in their diet than most species in the genus, but are still predominantly herbivorous as adults. In addition to a variety of algae and aquatic mosses, plants reported in the diets include fanwort (Cabomba), coontails (Ceratophyllum), duckweed (Lemna minor), large-flowered waterweed (Egeria densa), waterthyme (Hydrilla verticillata), water milfoil (Myriophyllum), fragrant water-lily (Nymphaea odorata), southern waternymph (Najas guadalupensis), spadderdock (Nuphar luteum), pondweed (Potamogeton), arrowhead (Sagittaria sp.), and water-celery (Vallisneria americana) among many others.

== Gallery ==
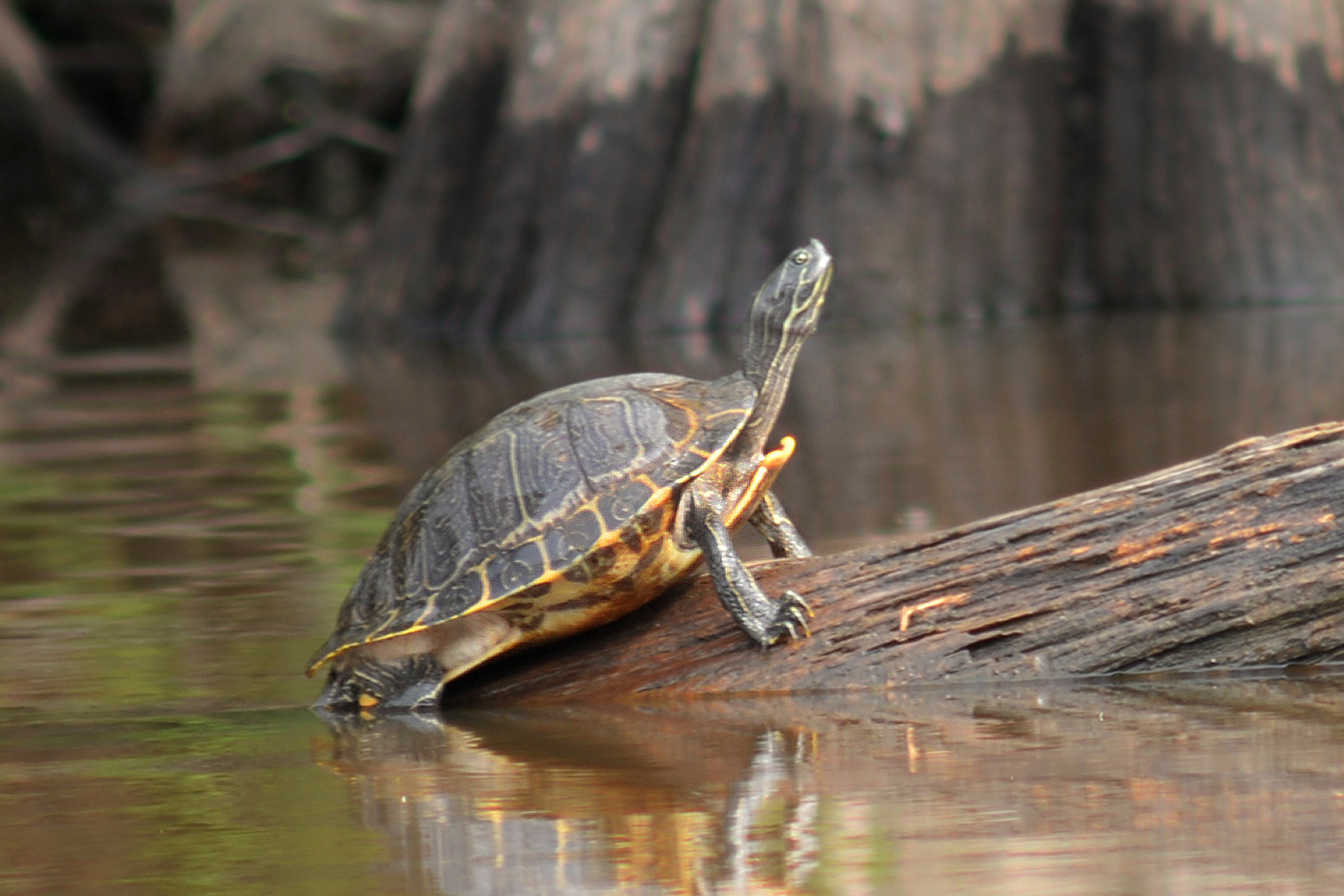
River cooter (Pseudemys concinna), photographed in situ, Marion County. Texas (13 April 2017)

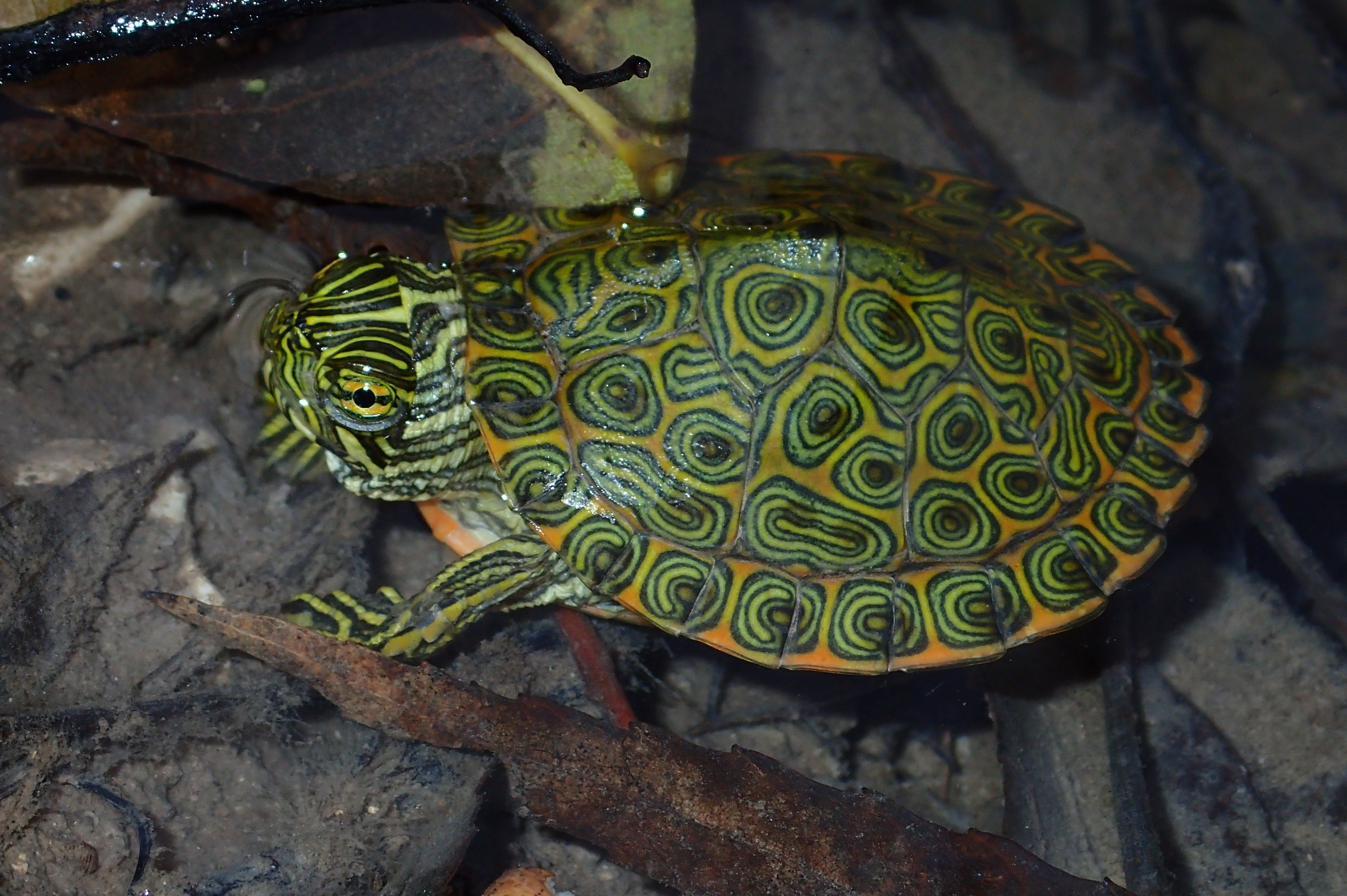
Rio Grande cooter (Pseudemys gorzugi), a juvenile from Kinney County, Texas (11 Nov. 2018)

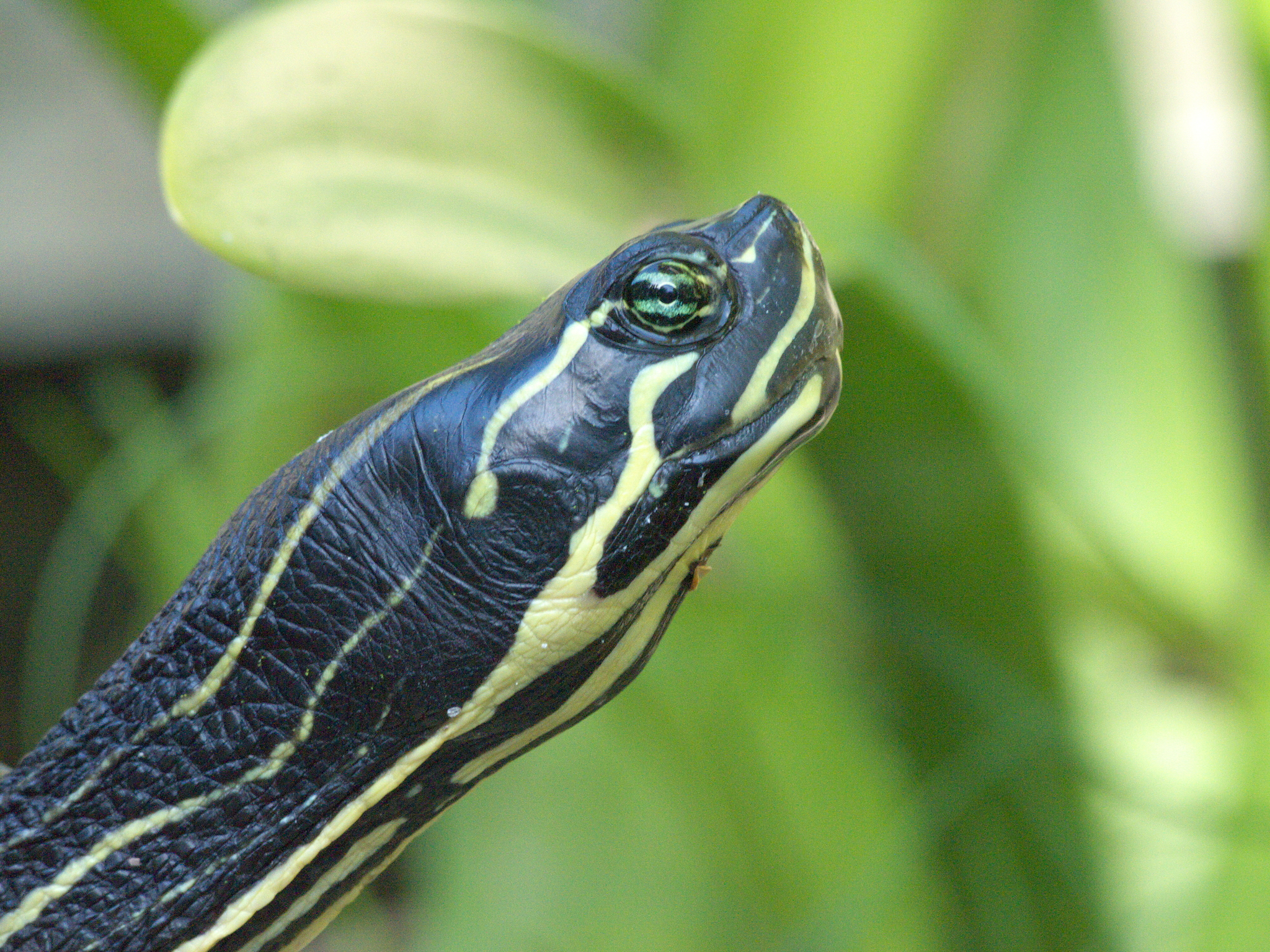
Florida Red-bellied Cooter (Pseudemys nelsoni), Monroe County, Florida (21 Dec. 2011)

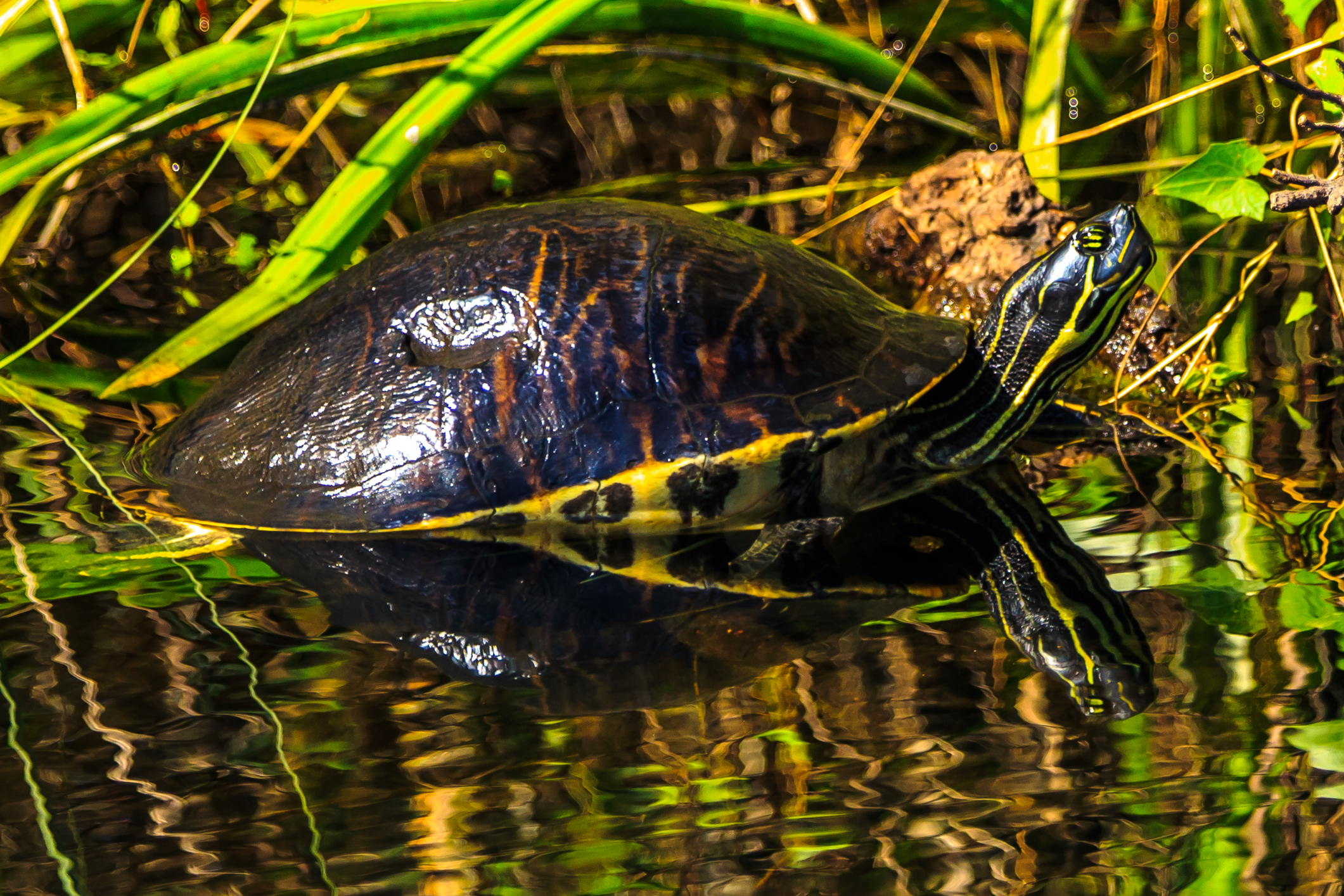
Peninsula cooter (Pseudemys peninsularis), Miami-Dade Co., Florida (12 Jan. 2014)

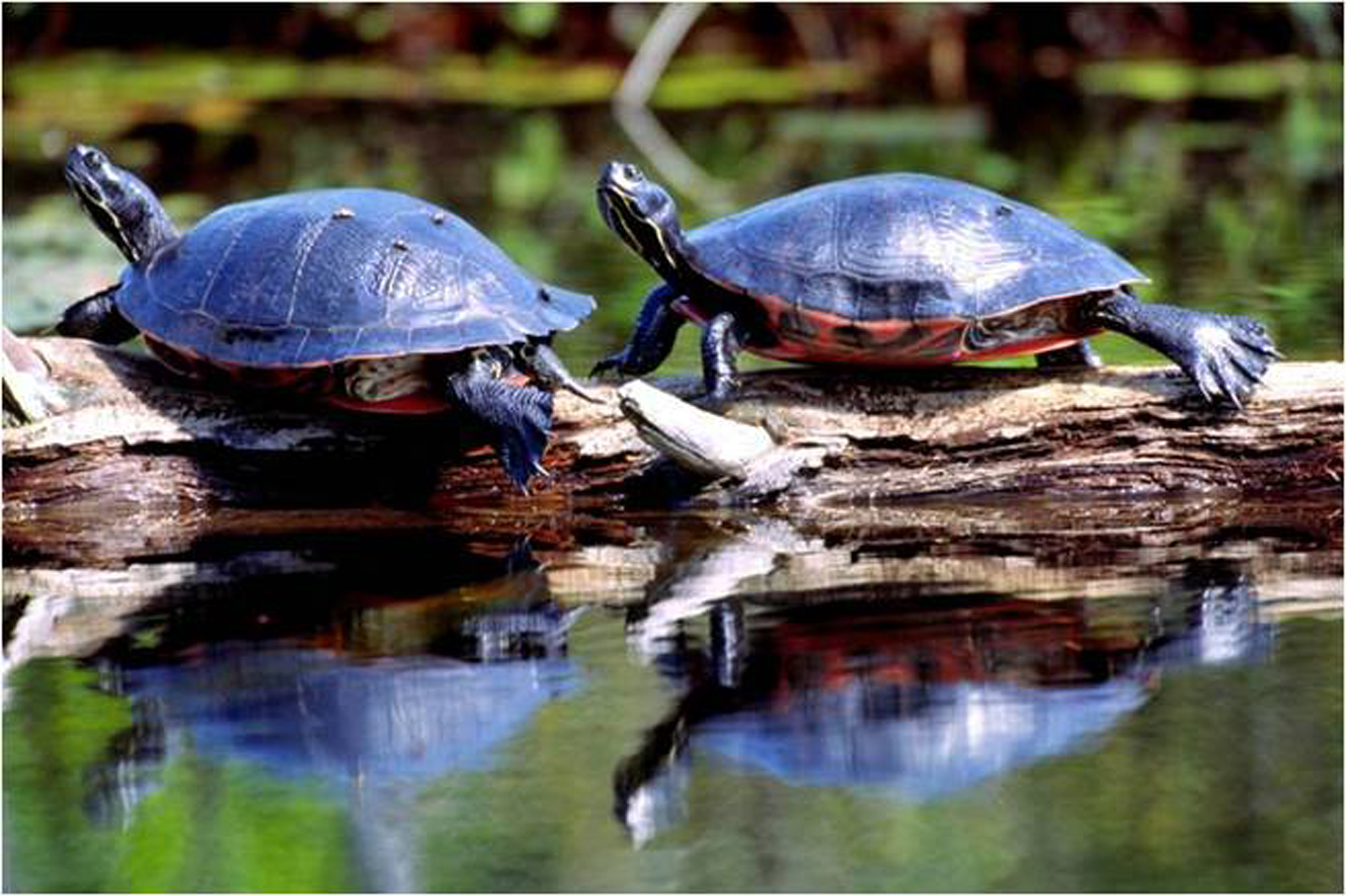
Northern red-bellied cooter (Pseudemys rubriventris), Plymouth Co,, Massachusetts (22 June 2011)

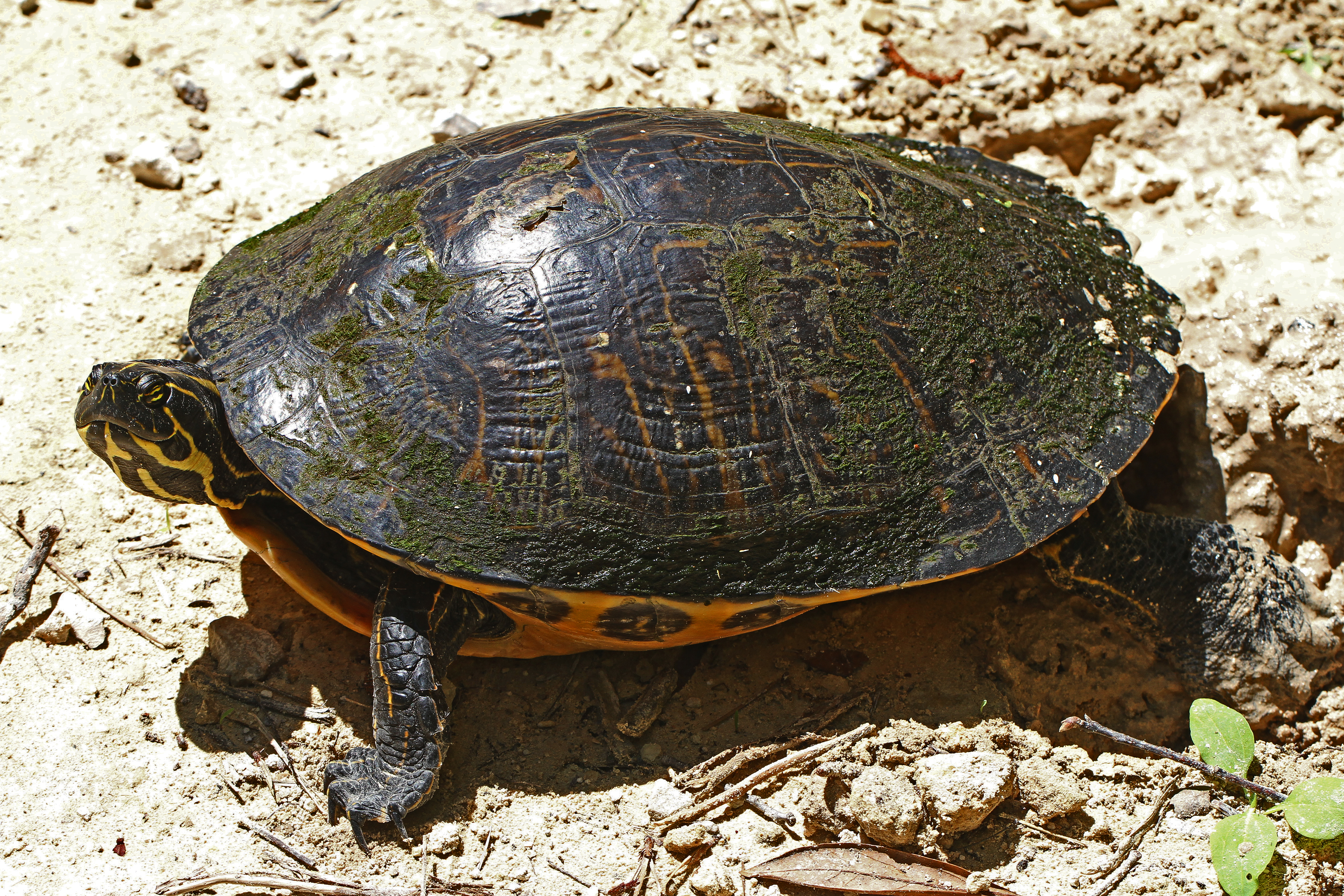
Suwannee Cooter (Pseudemys suwanniensis), Levy County, Florida (28 Apr. 2013)

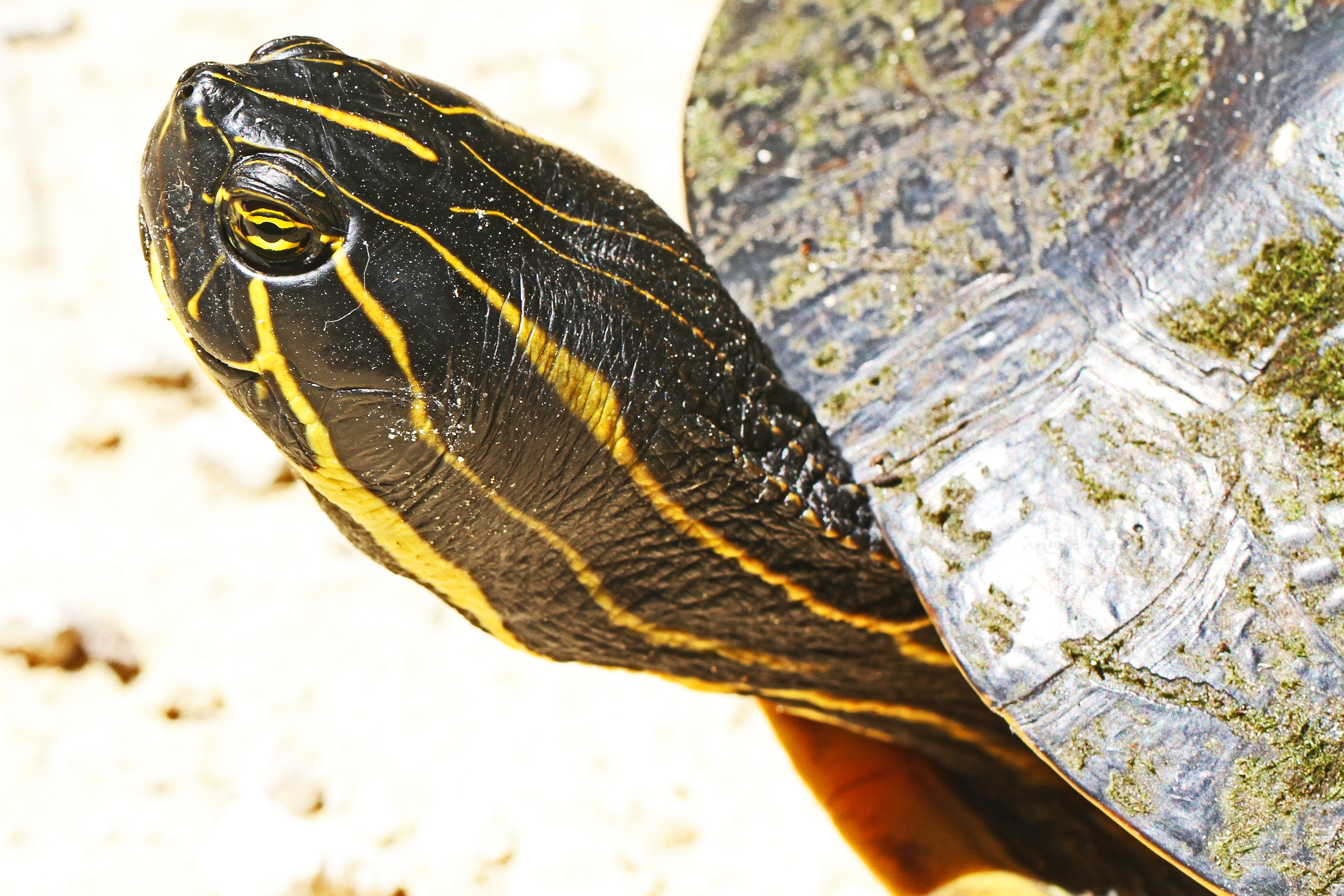
Suwannee Cooter (Pseudemys suwanniensis), close up of head, Levy County, Florida (28 Apr. 2013)

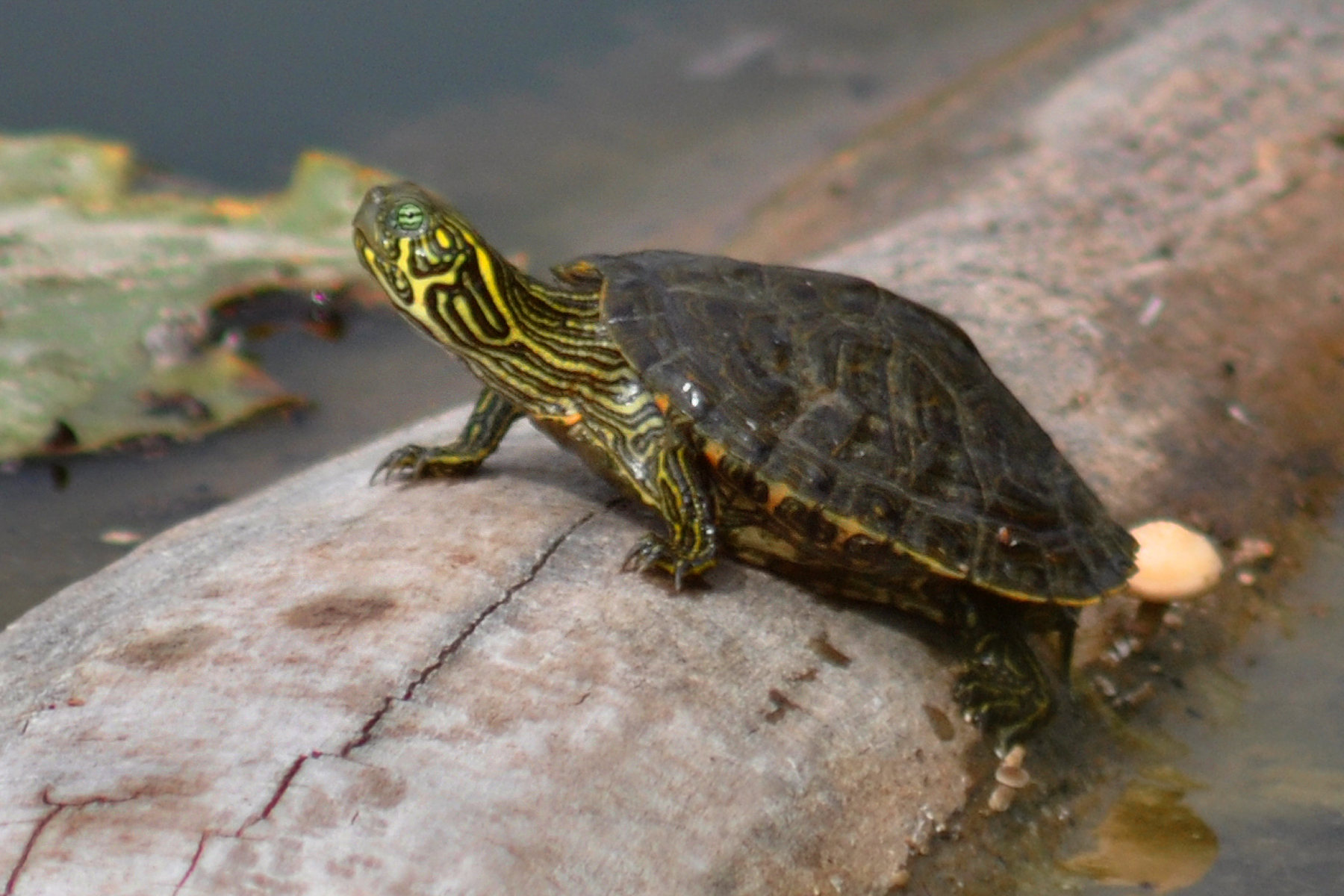
Texas cooter (Pseudemys texana), photographed in situ, Kerr County, Texas (9 May 2014)
