= Sue Grayzel =

American academic historian

Susan R. Grayzel is an American academic historian. Since 2017, she has been Professor of History at Utah State University, having previously been Professor of History at the University of Mississippi, where she was also Director of the Sarah Isom Center for Women and Gender Studies.

== Biography ==
Grayzel graduated from Harvard University with a Bachelor of Arts (AB) degree magna cum laude in history and literature in 1986. She completed a Master of Arts (MA) degree in Late Modern European History at the University of California at Berkeley in 1989, and stayed there to complete a doctorate (PhD), awarded in 1994 for her thesis "Women's Identities at War: The Cultural Politics of Gender in Britain and France, 1914–1919".

She joined the Department of History at the University of Mississippi in 1996, eventually becoming Professor of History, but in 2017 moved to Utah State University as Professor of History. At the University of Mississippi, she was Director of the Sarah Isom Center for Women and Gender Studies from 2013, having been interim director from 2011 to 2013. In 2014, she became a Fellow of the American Council of Learned Societies.

== Research ==
Grayzel's work has focused on women, war and work in modern Britain. Her publications include:

- War: Gender, Motherhood, and Politics in Britain and France during the First World War (University of North Carolina Press, 1999).

Winner of the British Council Prize from the North American Conference on British Studies in 2000.

- Women and the First World War (Longman, 2002).
- (Co-editor with Philippa Levine) Gender, Labour, War and Empire: Essays on Modern Britain (Palgrave, 2009).
- At Home and Under Fire: Air Raids and Culture in Britain from the Great War to the Blitz (Cambridge University Press, 2012).
- The First World War: A Brief History with Documents, History and Culture Series (Bedford St. Martins, 2012).
- (Co-editor with Tammy M. Proctor) Gender and the Great War (Oxford University Press, 2017).
