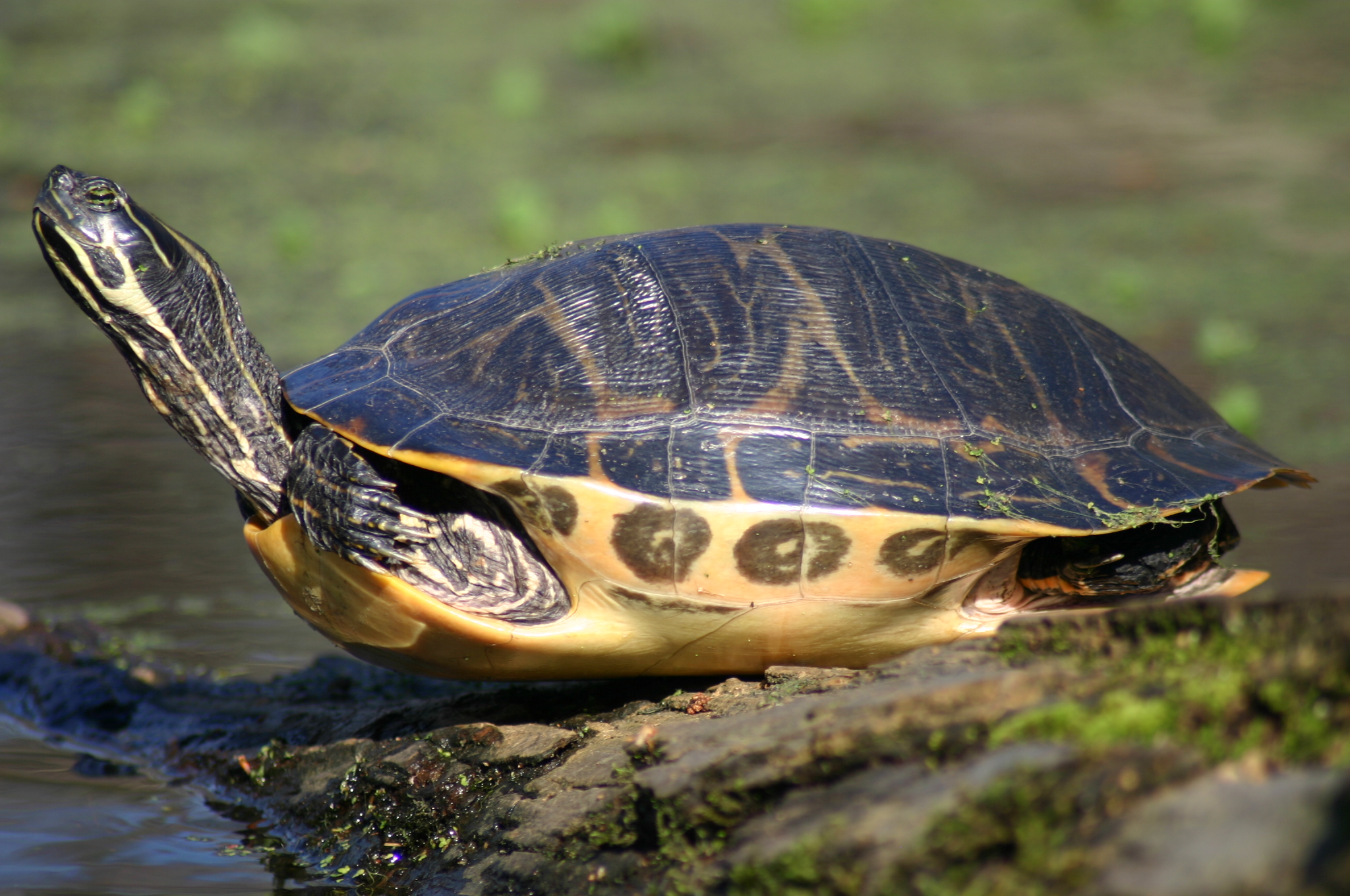

Conservation status
- Least Concern (IUCN 3.1)

Scientific classification
- Kingdom: Animalia
- Phylum: Chordata
- Class: Reptilia
- Order: Testudines
- Suborder: Cryptodira
- Family: Emydidae
- Genus: Pseudemys
- Species: P. floridana

Binomial name
- Pseudemys floridana (LeConte, 1830)

Synonyms
- Testudo floridana LeConte, 1830; Terrapene floridana Bonaparte, 1830; Emys floridana Duméril & Bibron, 1835; Clemmys (Clemmys) floridana Fitzinger, 1835; Clemmys foridana Strauch, 1862 (ex errore); Pseudemys floridana Baur, 1893; Chrysemys floridana Ditmars, 1907; Pseudemys floridana floridana Carr, 1935; Pseudemys floridiana Battersby, 1960 (ex errore); Chrysemys floridana floridana Cochran & Goin, 1970; Pseudemys concinna floridana Ashe, 1970

= Coastal plain cooter =

Species of turtle

The coastal plain cooter (Pseudemys floridana) or Florida cooter is a species of large herbivorous freshwater turtle in the genus Pseudemys.

== Biology ==
The species is found within the southeastern coastal plain of the United States, from extreme southeastern Virginia southward through all of Florida and westward to the vicinity of Mobile Bay, Alabama. The nominate race (P. f. floridana) occupies most of the species' geographic range but is replaced in the Florida peninsula by the peninsula cooter (Pseudemys peninsularis), which is primarily distinguished by differences in head markings. Both races can be distinguished from sympatric Pseudemys species by the immaculate yellow color of their plastrons and the lack of a U-shaped cusp in the upper jaw (characteristic of the Florida redbelly turtle). The carapace length of the size ranges from 23 to 33 cm (9.1 to 13.0 in) typically and the normal weigh is (in the slightly larger females) 2.5 to 3.5 kg (5.5 to 7.7 lb). The record sized female measured 40 cm (16 in) in carapace length.

The cooter is mainly herbivorous and inhabits lakes, sloughs, ponds, slow-flowing streams, and other still bodies of water with soft bottoms and abundant aquatic vegetation. However, it can be found in high densities in some Florida spring runs, usually in heavily vegetated areas with little flow. This species is active year-round and spends a large portion of the day basking on logs.

Coastal cooters are frequently exported for consumption and the pet trade, with about 60% wild caught individuals and 40% captive bred. Recent protection by many southeastern states has curbed this exploitation but illegal harvest for local consumption may still threaten some populations.

== Gallery ==
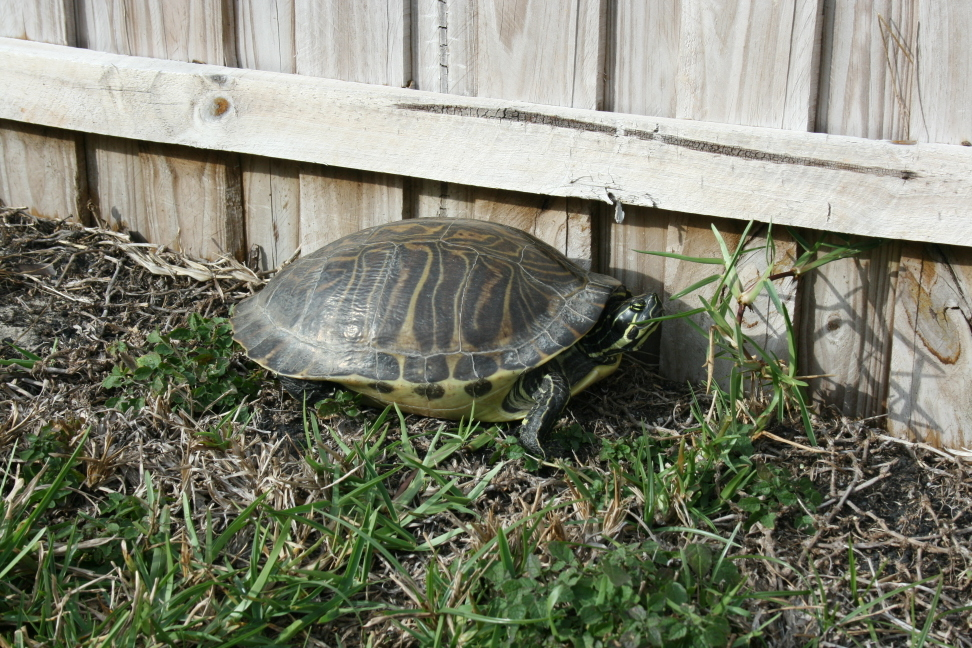
side shot

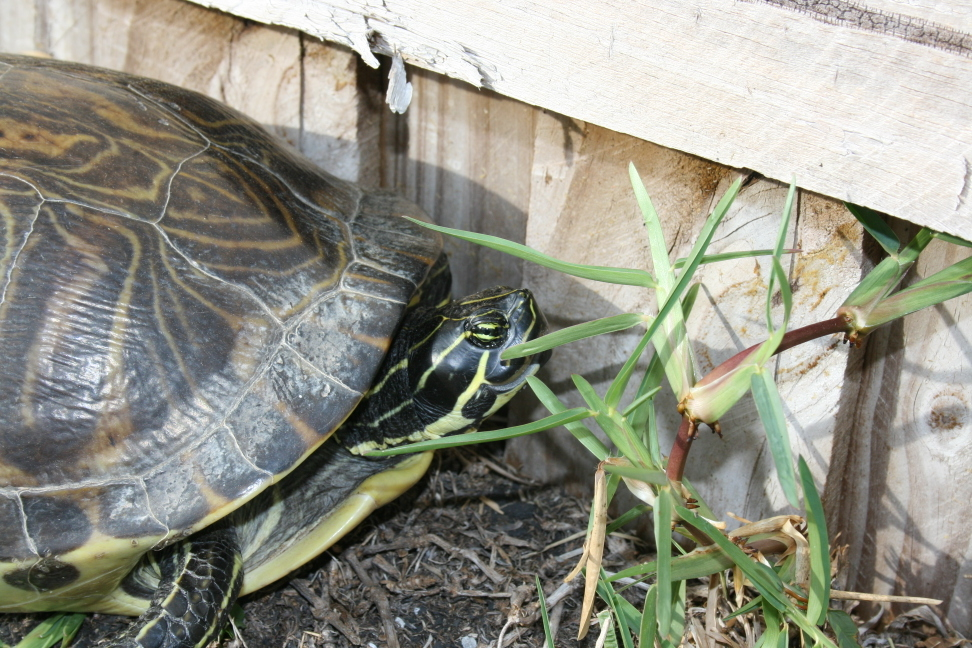
front shot
