= Tammy M. Proctor =

American historian

Tammy M. Proctor is an American academic historian; since 2013, she has been at Utah State University (as a distinguished professor since 2017), having previously been H. O. Hirt Endowed Professor of History at Wittenberg University (2010–13).

== Biography ==
Proctor grew up in Kansas City and completed a Bachelor of Arts (BA) degree in history and journalism at University of Missouri in 1990. She then completed a doctorate (PhD) in history at Rutgers University in 1995.

Proctor was a history instructor at Rutgers in 1994 and then spent the academic year 1994–95 as a visiting lecturer at Princeton University. She was an assistant professor of history at Lakeland College, Shehoygan, from 1995 to 1998, when she joined Wittenberg University as an assistant professor of history; she was appointed co-director of the Women's Studies Program in 1999 and became sole director in 2000. She was promoted to associate professor in 2001 and to full professor in 2008. She became H. O. Hirt Endowed Professor of History at the Wittenberg in 2010, serving until she joined Utah State University (USU) as a professor of history in 2013. In 2017, she was also appointed a distinguished professor by USU.

== Research ==
Proctor's research has focused on the social and cultural history of the First World War (especially civilian experiences); she is also interested in transnational histories of youth and gender. She has studied Boy Scouts, Girl Guides and women spies. Her publications include:

- World War I: A Short History (Wiley-Blackwell, 2017)
- (With Sue Grayzel) Gender and the Great War (Oxford University Press, 2017).
- (With Sophie De Schaepdrijver) An English Governess in the Great War: The Secret Diary of Mary Thorp (Oxford University Press, 2017).
- Civilians in a World at War, 1914–1918 (New York University Press, 2010).
- Scouting for Girls: A Century of Girl Guides and Girl Scouts (Praeger, 2009).
- (With Nelson R. Block) Nelson Block; Tammy Proctor, eds. (2009). Scouting Frontiers: Youth and Scout Movement’s First Century. Cambridge, UK: Cambridge Scholars Publishing. ISBN 978-1443804509.
- Female Intelligence: Women and Espionage in the First World War (New York University Press, 2003).
- On My Honour: Guides and Scouts in Interwar Britain (American Philosophical Society, 2002).
