= Archie Carr =

American herpetologist, ecologist and conservationist

- Born: June 16, 1909; Mobile, Alabama
- Died: May 21, 1987 (aged 77); Micanopy, Florida
- Education: University of Florida
- Known for: World authority on sea turtles
- Spouse: Marjorie Harris Carr
- Awards: Daniel Giraud Elliot Medal (1952)
- Scientific career
- Fields: Herpetology; Conservation Biology; Ecology; Marine Biology
- Workplaces: University of Florida

Archibald Fairly Carr Jr. (June 16, 1909 – May 21, 1987) was an American herpetologist, ecologist, and conservationist. He was a Professor of Zoology at the University of Florida and a writer on science and nature. He brought attention to the world's declining sea turtle populations due to over-exploitation and habitat loss. Wildlife refuges in Florida and Costa Rica have been named in his honor.

== Biography ==
Born in Mobile, Alabama, to a Presbyterian pastor, Carr grew up in Mobile, Fort Worth, Texas, and Savannah, Georgia. He studied Biology with specialization in zoology at the University of Florida (UF), eventually specializing in herpetology too. He further refined that interest to the study of turtles and eventually became one of the world's foremost authorities on sea turtles. He married Marjorie Harris Carr, a conservationist herself.

While a student at UF, he became a member of the Pi Kappa Phi fraternity. From UF, he received bachelor's degree in 1932, M.S. in 1934, and Ph.D. in 1937.

He was a high school science teacher before becoming a college professor. He published numerous books and articles, including Ulendo: Travels of a Naturalist in and out of Africa, High Jungles and Low, So Excellent a Fishe (about his green turtles), The Windward Road and several Time-Life books such as The Everglades and The Reptiles. He also authored the Handbook of Turtles, and with Coleman Jett Goin, Guide to the Reptiles, Amphibians and Freshwater Fishes of Florida. While a serious scientific and nature writer, he also published a parody of scientific taxonomic keys – his A Subjective Key to the Fishes of Alachua County, Florida, affectionately known as the "Carr Key".

Carr became a bit of a legend at UF, and students vied with one another to take his Community Ecology course in which they were involved in several major and minor field trips around northern Florida and southern Georgia. Listening to Carr talk about the Sand Pine scrub near Ocala or his comments as he guided students through the Okefenokee Swamp in canoes was considered a great privilege.

Carr was also known for his efforts in conservation, especially for sea turtles, helping convince Costa Rica to establish Tortuguero National Park in 1975. He was a co-founder of the Caribbean Conservation Corporation, which helps to save and monitor sea turtles in Tortuguero, Costa Rica. He often joined his wife Marjorie Carr in conservation work, as she was a major advocate for conservation in her own right. In 1952 the National Academy of Sciences awarded Carr the Daniel Giraud Elliot Medal.

== Legacy ==
- Founder and Scientific Director of Sea Turtle Conservancy (formerly Caribbean Conservation Corporation) from 1959 until his death in 1987.
- The Archie Carr National Wildlife Refuge, which covers the beaches from Melbourne Beach south to Wabasso Beach was set up in 1994 in honor of his efforts.
- In 1994, the Dr. Archie Carr Wildlife Refuge was established in Costa Rica in his memory.
- Carr's son, Archie Carr III, is a conservationist who coordinated Central American programs for the New York Zoological Society (now known as the Wildlife Conservation Society); Carr III was instrumental in establishing the Cockscomb Basin Wildlife Sanctuary in Belize.
- A book about Carr entitled The Man Who Saved Sea Turtles: Archie Carr and the Origins of Conservation was published in 2007 by Oxford University Press. This book was written by Frederick R. Davis, Assistant Professor of History at the Florida State University.
- Carr's work is referenced in the 1985 romantic-drama film Turtle Diary.
- The Florida Department of Environmental Protection has named its newest building after Archie and Marjorie Carr.
- Carr is commemorated in the scientific name of a species of snake, Sibon carri.
- In 1987 the Ecological Society of America awarded Carr the Eminent Ecologist Award.
- World Sea Turtle Day is celebrated on June 16th, coinciding with Archie Carr's birthday.

== Works ==
- Carr, Archie (1952). Handbook of Turtles; the Turtles of the United States, Canada, and Baja California.
  - Carr, Archie (1995). paperback edition. Comstock Pub. Associates. ISBN 0-801-48254-2.
- Carr, Archie (1953). High Jungles and Low.
- Carr, Archie, and Coleman J. Goin (1955). Guide to the Reptiles, Amphibians, and Fresh-water Fishes of Florida.
- Carr, Archie (1956). The Windward Road, 1st edition. Carr, Archie (1979). 1979 edition. University Presses of Florida. ISBN 0-8130-0639-2.. Carr, Archie (June 26, 2013). 2013 edition. Knopf Doubleday Publishing. ISBN 978-0307832115.
- Carr, Archie (1963). The Reptiles (Series: LIFE Nature Library).
- Carr, Archie (1964). Ulendo: Travels of a Naturalist in and out of Africa.
- Carr, Archie (1967, 1984). So Excellent a Fishe: A Natural History of Sea Turtles. (ISBN 0-292-77595-4).
- Carr, Archie (1973). The Everglades. (Time-Life Book).
- Carr, Archie (Marjorie Carr, editor) (1994). A Naturalist in Florida: A Celebration of Eden. (ISBN 0-300-05589-7). Carr, Archie (September 1996). 1996 paperback edition. Yale University Press. ISBN 978-0300068542.

== Academic genealogy ==
Archie Carr graduated with his PhD in 1938 from the University of Florida under J.S. Rogers. His academic ancestry passes from Rogers (PhD 1929 University of Illinois), through Stephen Alfred Forbes (PhD 1884 Indiana University) (the first Chief of the Illinois Natural History Survey and a founder of aquatic ecosystem science), the eminent evolutionary biologist and ecologist David Starr Jordan (PhD 1872 Cornell), to Louis Agassiz (PhD 1829 Munich, Germany) the eminent ichthyologist, geologist, and natural historian.

Carr advised and graduated 18 PhD students while faculty at the University of Florida: D.A. Belkin (1961), Karen A. Bjorndal (1979), D.K. Caldwell (1957), S.P. Christman (1975), M.J. Corn (1981), J.W. Crenshaw, Jr. (1955), D.C. Dietz (1979), D.W. Ehrenfeld (1966), D.E. Goodman (1971), E.V. Gourley (1969), H.F. Hirth (1962), C.G. Jackson (1964), J.F. Jackson (1972), A.B. Meylan (1984), J.A. Mortimer (1981), Robert H. Mount (1961), Peter C. Pritchard (1969), and Douglas A. Rossman (1962).
