= San Buenaventura de Potano =

Archaeological site in Florida, US

San Buenaventura de Potano was a Spanish mission near Orange Lake in southern Alachua County or northern Marion County, Florida, located on the site where the town of Potano had been located when it was visited by Hernando de Soto in 1539. The Richardson/UF Village Site (8AL100), in southern Alachua County, has been proposed as the location of the town and mission.

== Town of Potano ==
Potano was the namesake town of the Potano tribe or chiefdom, part of the Timucua people. In the middle of the 16th century the town of Potano was located west of Orange Lake, near Evinston. The Hernando de Soto expedition visited Potano in 1539. In 1564, and again in 1565, the Utina chiefdom on the St. Johns River and the French (from Fort Caroline) raided the town of Potano. Many Potanos were killed, and many others captured. In 1584, in retaliation for raids by the Potano against the Spanish, the principal town of Potano was attacked and burned by Spanish soldiers. The town of Potano was then moved to a site northwest of present-day Gainesville.

== Apalo/Apula ==
A place or mission called Apalo or Apula was associated with the original site of Potano. (Apula is Timucuan for "fort" or "stockade".) De Soto's expedition passed a town called Apalu or Hapaluya, but it appears to have been in what was later called Yustaga, west of the Suwannee River, and not associated with Potano. A town named Apalo is shown on the Jacques le Moyne map, located to the northeast of Potano. In 1597 or later, Fray Baltasár Lopéz established a visita, a mission without a resident priest, called Apalo. Milanich states that the visita may have been at the Richardson site. In 1616 Father Luís Jerónimo de Oré visited a mission called Apalo, two and one-half days walk from San Antonio de Ancape on the St Johns River.

== Mission ==
In 1601, the new leader of the Potano chiefdom asked the Spanish governor for permission to re-settle the original site of the Potano principal town, which was granted by Governor Gonzalo Méndez de Canço. In that same year the Cacique of Apalau traveled to Saint Augustine together with the heir to the Cacique of Potano. In 1608, Mission San Buenaventura de Potano was established in the site of the old town by Fray Francisco Pareja. It initially served about 200 people, all of whom were baptized. The mission, under the name of San Buenaventura, disappeared from Spanish records after 1613, probably because the population was reduced and scattered by epidemics. Worth states that San Buenaventura was probably identical to the Apalo mission visited by Father Oré in 1616.

== Discovery ==
As of 2016, the Richardson/UF Village Site (8AL100), in Alachua County located west of Orange Lake, appears to have been accepted by archaeologists as the site of de Soto's Potano and the San Buenaventura de Potano mission.
