= Arapaha =

Native American town in Georgia, US

Arapaha (also Arapaja or Harapaha) was a Timucua town on the Alapaha River in the 17th century. The name was also sometimes used to designate a province or sub-province in Spanish Florida.

Arapaha entered historical records with the establishment of the mission of Santa María de los Angeles de Arapaha in the 1620s. This mission was to the north of missions established in Timucua Province (in the original narrow sense of the territory of the Northern Utina), and northeast of Yustaga Province. The town of Arapaha was probably located on the Alapaha River. ("Arapaha" is presumed to have been changed to "Alapaha" by speakers of one of the Muskogean languages, which lack "r".) "Arapaha" likely meant "many houses" or "bear town" in the Timucuan language. The people referred to by the French as "Onatheaqua" in the 1560s may have been the same as the Northern Utina or Arapaha.

Several other missions are associated with Santa María de los Angeles de Arapaha in Spanish records, including Santa Cruz de Cachipile (near present-day Lake Park, Georgia), San Ildefonso de Chamini (or Chamile) (near Hixtown Swamp in Madison County, Florida) and San Francisco de Chuaquin (on the lower Withlacoochee River near the Suwannee River). Chuaquin was on or close to the royal road between St. Augustine and Apalachee Province. Apapaha, Cachapile and Chamile were located north to northwest of San Augustín de Urihica, well off of the royal road. Cachipile and Chaquin were subject to the chief of Chamile.

Whether Arapaha and its associated towns/missions constituted a province in northernmost Florida and southernmost Georgia separate from Northern Utina Province is unclear. A Spanish traveler in 1630 referred to "Harapaha Province" located between Santa Isabel de Utinahica and Apalachee Province. The missions at Arapaha, Cachipile, Chamile and Chuaquin were reported to be in Northern Utina Province in 1655, but Arapaha, Cachipile and Chamile were located further from St. Augustine than were the missions of San Pedro y San Pablo de Potohiriba and Santa Elena de Machaba in Yustaga Province, which were themselves further from St. Augustine than were the southerly Northern Utina missions. The chiefs of Arapaha, Cachipile, Chamile and Chuaquin did not join the Timucua Rebellion of 1656, which was instigated by the head chief of the Northern Utina, indicating the possibility of some degree of autonomy or separation.

In the wake of the Timucua Rebellion of 1656, the Spanish executed many of the chiefs of Timucua (Northern Utina), Yustaga and Potano Provinces. Many of the towns thus left leaderless were already depopulated. The Spanish pressured the chiefs and people of Arapaha, Chamile, Cachipile and Chaquin to move to towns along the royal road. The chief of Arapaha was given Santa Fé de Toloca as his chief town, as well as jurisdiction over San Francisco de Potano, San Pedro y San Pablo de Potohiriba, San Juan Guacara and other mission towns. The old towns were largely depopulated when visited in 1658. The residents who had not moved to the towns on the royal road had mostly died or fled to the woods.
