= Utinahica =

Timucua town and people in Georgia, U.S.

A map of the Timucua chiefdoms of mainland southeast Georgia, including the Utinahica (peach).

Utinahica was a town that was the site of a Spanish mission, Santa Isabel de Utinahica. It may have been the chief town of a Timucua tribe and chiefdom in the 17th century, but Hann says there is not enough known about it to be sure. The name means "lord's village". (Note: Utina was a chiefly title, rarely used by the Spanish, and may have indicated a higher rank of chief than holata.) Utinahica (or, rather, the mission of Santa Isabela), was called a "province" (Note: Hudson et al. argue that the Spanish used provincia to designate political units rather than linguistic or ethnic groups.) in one Spanish report. It was 30 leagues east of Arapaha, and 50 leagues northeast of the town of Tarihica in the Northern Utina Province. It was at or near where the Oconee and Ocmulgee rivers join to form the Altamaha River. The people of Utinahica apparently practiced a regional variant of the Lamar regional culture, unusual for a Timucuan-speaking people. Worth identifies the province of Utinahica with archaeological sites, including the Lind Landing site, Coffee Bluff site, and Bloodroot site, that have yielded artifacts of the Square Ground Lamar culture from before the 15th century until the middle of the 17th century. The Square Ground Lamar culture is otherwise associated with sites occupied by speakers of Muskogean languages. Archaeological sites identified with all other known Timucuan-speakers, with the possible exception of Guadalquini, do not have affinities with the Square Ground Lamar culture.

In 1597, Fray Pedro de Chozas led an expedition of three Spaniards and 30 Guales into interior Georgia, visiting several provinces or chiefdoms, including Tama, Ocute, Talufa, Usatipa, and a populous area near the fork where the Oconee and Ocmulgee rivers form the Altamaha River, which Worth interprets as Utinahica. The mission of Santa Isabel de Utinahica was established in the town of Utinahica early in the 17th century. The mission of Santa Isabela was visited by Gerónimo de Oré in 1616. Santa Isabela also appeared on a list of missions in 1630. The town sent two men to St, Augustine in 1636 as part of the annual labor draft from Guale Province. By that time, Chiscas and Chichimecos were raiding Spanish missions, killing or kidnapping many of the people of the missions. Sometime in the 1630s or 1640s (Worth says between 1636 and 1655), the people of Utinahica moved down the Altamaha River to join the mission of San Buenaventura de Guadalquini on St. Simon's Island. Clara, identified as a cacica (female chief) of Utinahica, was listed as living at the mission in 1685, shortly after Gualdalquini had moved to a site near the St. Johns River.

== Sources ==
- Hann, John H. (1996). A History of the Timucua Indians and Missions. Gainesville, Florida: University Press of Florida. ISBN 978-0-8130-1424-1.
- Hudson, Charles; Beck, Robin A. Jr.; DePratter, Chester B.; Ethridge, Robbie; Worth, John E. (Summer 2008). "On Interpreting Cofitacheque". Ethnohistory. 53 (3): 465–490. doi:10.1215/00141801-2008-005 – via academia.edu.
- Worth, John E. (1993). "Prelude to abandonment: the interior provinces of early 17th-century Georgia". Early Georgia. 21: 24–58 – via University of West Florida Libraries.
- Worth, John E. (2009). "Ethnicity and Ceramics on the Southeastern Atlantic Coast: An Ethnohistorical Analysis". In Deagan, Kathleen; Thomas, David Hurst (eds.). From Santa Elena to St. Augustine: Indigenous Ceramic Variability (A.D. 1400-1700). Anthropological Papers of the American Museum of Natural History. American Museum of Natural History. pp. 179–207. ISSN 0065-9452.
