= Timucua (disambiguation) =

The Timucua were a Native American people of northern Florida and southeastern Georgia.

Timucua may also refer to:

- Timucua language, the language spoken by the Timucua people
- Northern Utina, also known as the Timucua, a particular Timucua chiefdom
- Timucuan Ecological and Historic Preserve, wetland preserve and archaeological site near Jacksonville, Florida
