= Northern Utina =

Extinct Native American people in Florida

Total population
- Extinct as tribe

Regions with significant populations
- Northern Florida east of the Suwannee River

Languages
- Timucua language, Timucua proper dialect

Religion
- Native

Related ethnic groups
- Timucua

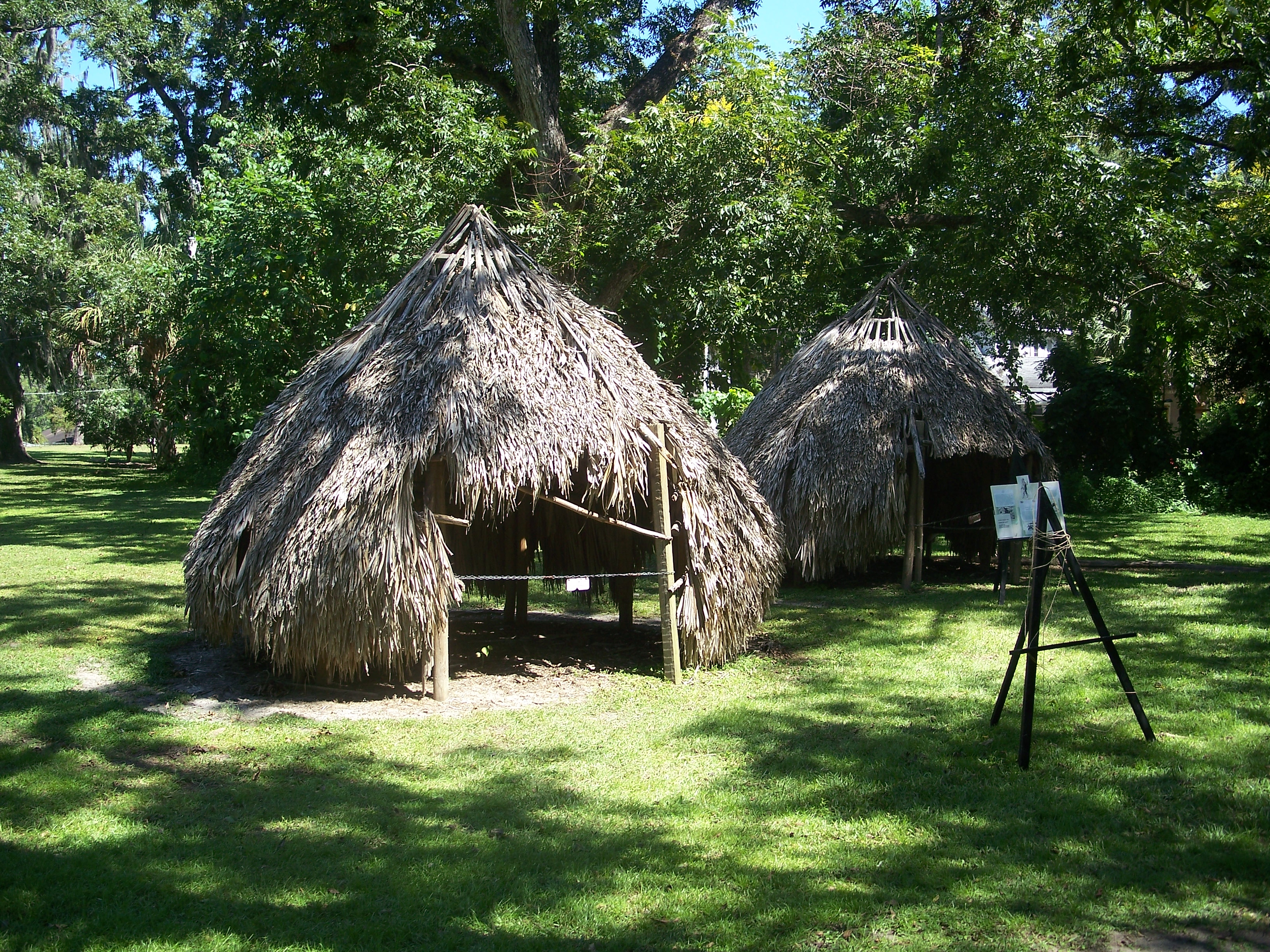
Reconstruction of Timucua paha (house) at the Marion County Historical Museum (formerly East Hall)

The Northern Utina, also known as the Timucua or simply Utina, were a Timucua people of northern Florida. They lived north of the Santa Fe River and east of the Suwannee River, and spoke a dialect of the Timucua language known as "Timucua proper". They appear to have been closely associated with the Yustaga people, who lived on the other side of the Suwannee. The Northern Utina represented one of the most powerful tribal units in the region in the 16th and 17th centuries, and may have been organized as a loose chiefdom or confederation of smaller chiefdoms. The Fig Springs archaeological site may be the remains of their principal village, Ayacuto, and the later Spanish mission of San Martín de Timucua.

The Northern Utina had sporadic contact with the Europeans beginning in the first half of the 16th century. In 1539 Spanish conquistador Hernando de Soto passed through the Northern Utina region, where he captured and subsequently executed Aguacaleycuen, who may have been the principal chief at the time. Later French sources note a powerful chief in the area named Onatheaqua, who may have been a successor to Aguacaleycuen. After several decades of resistance the Northern Utina became part of the Spanish mission system in Florida in 1597. Their territory was organized as the Timucua Province, and San Martín de Timucua and three other missions were established between 1608 and 1616. The profile of the Northern Utina increased considerably as smaller peripheral provinces were incorporated into the Timucua Province, which eventually included all of northern Florida between approximately the Aucilla and St. Johns Rivers.

However, the tribe experienced significant demographic decline during the same period due to disease and other factors. They took the forefront in the Timucua Rebellion of 1656. This was put down by the Spanish, who razed their villages and relocated the populace to a series of new communities along the Camino Real or Royal Road running between the Apalachee Province and St. Augustine. In this reduced position the Northern Utina were largely powerless against raids by northern tribes allied with the English settlers such as the Creek and Yamasee, and suffered further from epidemics. They eventually moved closer to St. Augustine and mingled with other Timucua groups, losing their independent identity.

== Name ==
The name "Northern Utina" for these people is a scholarly convention; it was never used by the people themselves or by their Spanish or Indian contemporaries. It is unclear what the people themselves called themselves, if they had a general name for themselves at all. The Spanish in the 17th century knew them as the Timucua and referred to the region in which they lived as the Timucua Province. Their dialect was known as Timucua (now usually called "Timucua proper"). Over time smaller provinces were joined into the Timucua Province, and the name "Timucua" was applied to an increasingly wide area of northern Florida.

In the 20th century, when the name Timucua came to designate all the groups who spoke the Timucuan language, scholars began to substitute the term Utina for what the Spanish had known as the Timucua Province. Utina originally designated a different tribe who lived along the middle St. Johns River in the 16th century; these people were known as the Agua Dulce (Freshwater) to the Spanish in the 17th century. The conflation comes from the fact that the Utina were known to their enemies as Thimogona, which may be the origin of the name "Timucua". However, the 16th-century Utina were not particularly closely related to the people of the Timucua Province. Modern use of the term "Utina" has caused confusion between the 16th-century Utina chiefdom and the "Timucua proper"; as such scholars Jerald Milanich and Ken Johnson have suggested classing the two groups as eastern Utina and Northern Utina, respectively.

== Area ==
The Northern Utina lived in a region spreading roughly from the Suwannee River in the west to the St. Johns River in the east, and from the Santa Fe River northward into southern Georgia. However, the main centers of the population were in the eastern Suwannee River valley. On the other side of the Suwannee, living between it and the Aucilla River (present-day Madison and Taylor Counties), were another western Timucua group, the Yustaga. The Yustaga were closely related to the Northern Utina, but appear to have spoken a different dialect, perhaps Potano. Beyond the Yustaga were the non-Timucuan Apalachee, who lived throughout much of the Florida Panhandle. To the south and southeast of the Northern Utina, on the other side of the Santa Fe River, were the Potano, another Timucua group. Other Timucua speakers lived to the north in Georgia, including the Arapaha. Far to the east were the eastern Timucua groups, including the Saturiwa and the (eastern) Utina.

The area occupied by the Northern Utina (and the Yustaga) at the time of European contact corresponds to the area of the Suwannee Valley culture. Suwannee Valley ceramics were displaced by Leon Jefferson ceramics during the Spanish mission period (the 17th century).

== Early history and European contact ==
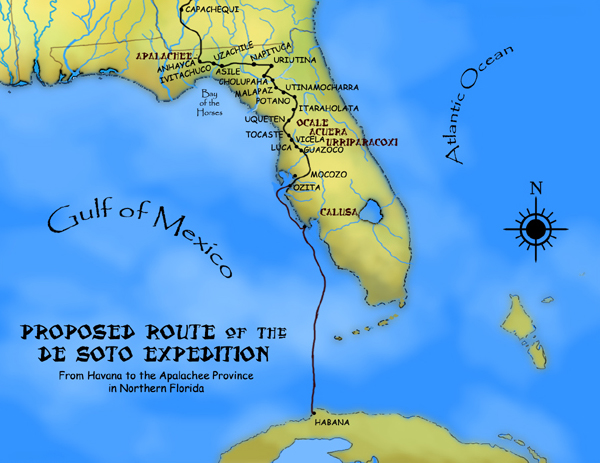
A suggested route for the first leg of the de Soto Expedition, based on Charles M. Hudson's 1997 map

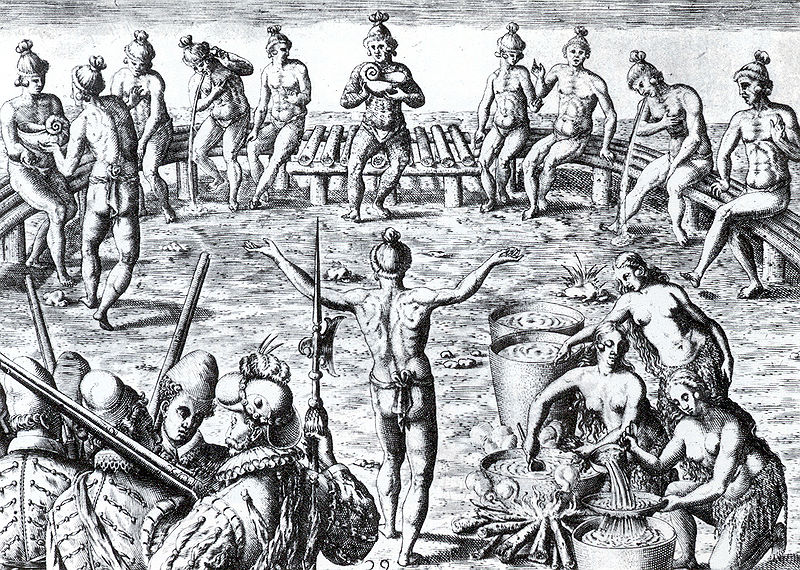
16th-century engraving by Jacques le Moyne of the Black drink ceremony among the Timucua of Florida

The area has been inhabited for thousands of years. In the first millennium AD the region's inhabitants participated in the Weedon Island culture, which spread across much of western Florida and beyond. From about 900 a derivative culture emerged in the Suwannee Valley area, known as the Suwannee Valley culture. This culture was common to all the Suwannee Valley peoples (the Northern Utina and the Yustaga), and as a Weedon Island derivative was closely related to the Alachua culture of the Potano. It is particularly distinguished by its ceramics.

Archaeological evidence suggests that the Northern Utina lived in small community groups, perhaps representing localized chiefdoms, separated from each other by considerable distances. John E. Worth suggests that these may have been organized into a larger regional chiefdom that was continuous from at least the early days of European contact through the 17th century. Early European accounts record certain chiefs as paramount over others, while during the 17th-century towns in the Timucua Province were missionized evidently based on their preeminence. This may be evidence of a continuous regional chiefdom, but Worth notes it must have been much looser than more integrated Timucua chiefdoms such as the eastern Utina, the Saturiwa, or the Potano. Large-scale monuments such as platform mounds, often signs of integrated regional chiefdoms, have not been found in Northern Utina territory, and ceramic dating may vary from community to community, suggesting disunity.

The Northern Utina probably encountered the survivors of the Narváez expedition in 1528, but the earliest definite historical record of them is in the accounts of Hernando de Soto's expedition, which passed through their territory in 1539. These accounts indicate that the Northern Utina were more populous than any other tribe De Soto had yet encountered, and lived in distinct villages that were subordinate to a chief named Aguacaleycuen. Aguacaleycuen's main village was located on the Ichetucknee River, perhaps at the Fig Springs archaeological site. Aguacaleycuen was allied with (and possibly related to) another chief on the other side of the Suwannee River, Uzachile, whose chiefdom may correspond with the later Yustaga chiefdom. Upon reaching Aguacaleycuen's village De Soto captured the chief, as was his custom, intending to release him once his party had safely reached Uzachile. Subsequently some subordinate chiefs, asserting that Uzachile sought an alliance with De Soto, led the Spanish into an ambush. After a battle, De Soto executed Aguacaleycuen and other hostages and moved into Uzachile's territory, which he found already evacuated.

In 1564 the French settlers of Fort Caroline heard of a powerful chief in this area named Onatheaqua. Though details are limited, this Onatheaqua may have ruled the Northern Utina chiefdom led earlier by Aguacaleycuen. The French understood his chiefdom to be near that of Chief Houstaqua, whose name is probably a variant of "Yustaga", and to the east of the Apalachee. However, they believed he lived near high mountains (the Appalachian Mountains, which early Europeans believed extended to Apalachee territory). The French believed Onatheaqua to be very wealthy and to have controlled access to the mountains and the strange and valuable things located there.

== Mission era ==
The Northern Utina received a number of Spanish emissaries following the 1565 establishment of St. Augustine, but they consistently rejected all Spanish overtures for several decades. Then in 1597, as part of a renewed wave of missionary effort, the Spanish sent the Timucua Christian leader Juan de Junco to the Northern Utina cacique mayor (head chief), probably at the town of Ayacuto at the Figs Springs site. Alone among the other missionaries sent out that year, Juan was successful, and convinced the chief to send emissaries to St. Augustine to negotiate peace. The Northern Utina rendered obedience to the Spanish crown, and the Spanish dispatched a friar to the main village of Ayacuto, where the important Mission San Martín de Timucua was established in 1608. Over the next eight years at least three more missions were established in Northern Utina territory: Santa Fé de Toloca, Santa Cruz de Tarihica, and San Juan de Guacara.

The profile of the Northern Utina increased substantially as smaller provinces were merged into Timucua Province, and San Martín became the principal mission and town for an increasingly wide area. However, they suffered considerable demographic decline from the epidemics that spread through Florida through the 17th century. Under the principal chief of Ayacuto Lúcas Menéndez, the Northern Utina were at the forefront of the Timucua Rebellion of 1656, in which they, together with the Yustaga and Potano, revolted against the Spanish colonial government. After the Spanish put down the rebellion the Northern Utina were forcibly relocated to a series of new towns along the Camino Real or Royal Road from Apalachee Province to St. Augustine. This caused a severe breakdown in the social structure, and the Northern Utina were largely defenseless against raids by the Creek and Yamasee allied to the English colonies to the north. As a result surviving Northern Utina migrated closer to St. Augustine where they merged with other Timucua peoples, and were removed to Cuba in 1763.
