= Santa Fe de Toloca =

Spanish mission in Florida

- Location within Florida
- 29°55′50.8614″N 82°31′16.4202″W
- Location: Alachua County, Florida, USA

Santa Fe de Toloca (Teleco, Toloco or Señor Santo Tomás de Santa Fe) was a Spanish mission that existed near the Santa Fe River in the northwestern part of what is now Alachua County, Florida, United States during the 17th century. It became an important place on the camino real (royal road) connecting St. Augustine with Apalachee Province, which was centered on the site of present-day Tallahassee, Florida. The site that the Santa Fe de Toloca mission occupied in the first half of the 17th century was partially excavated in the 1980s.

== History ==
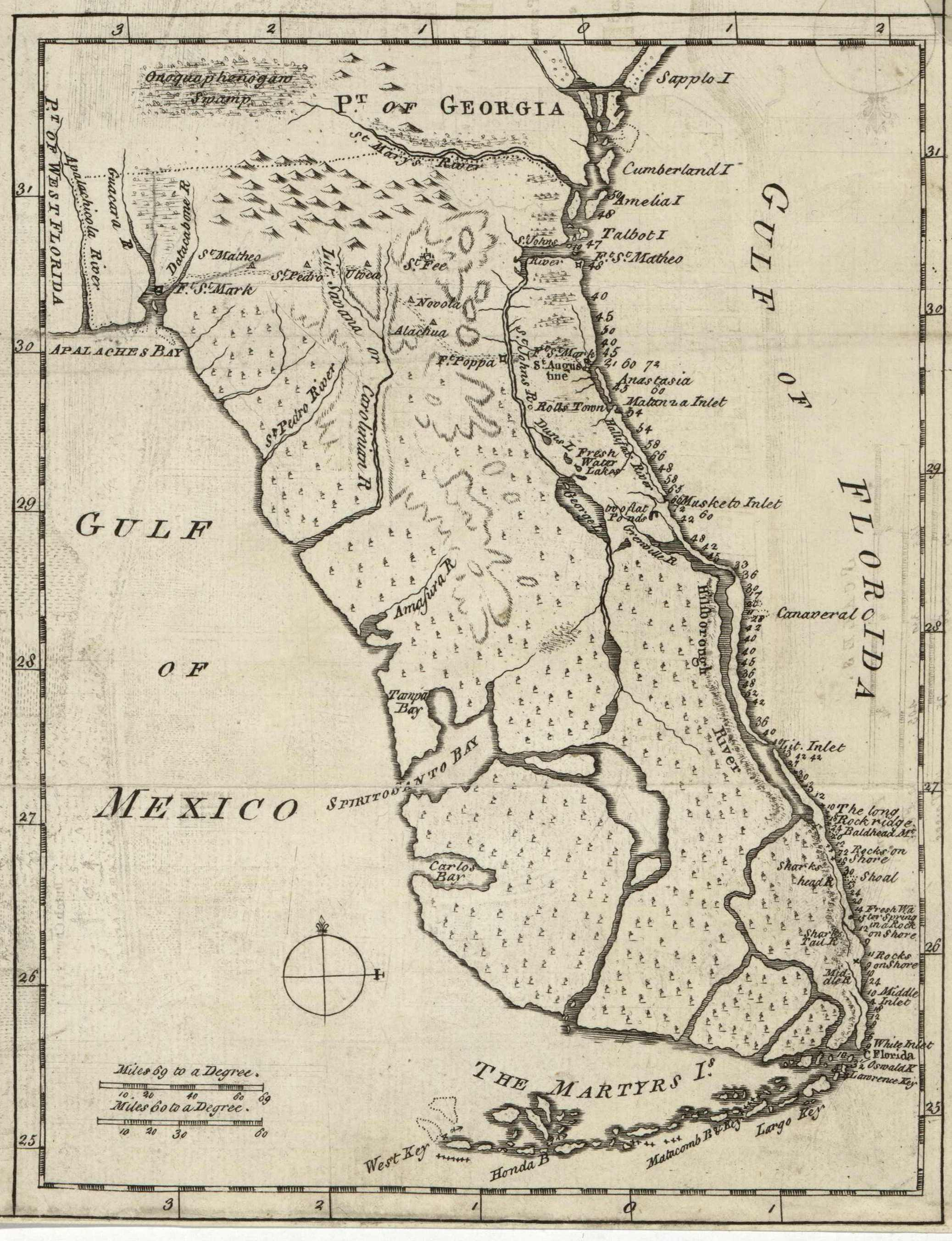
Santa Fe in 1764 map by John de Solís

The mission of Santa Fe de Toloca was established around 1610 or 1612, as Franciscan missionaries prepared to expand into territory north and west of the Santa Fe River. The mission probably was founded by the Franciscan Father Martín Prieto, who had established the nearby San Francisco de Potano mission. Like other Spanish missions in Florida, Santa Fe de Toloca would have been established in or near an existing Timucua village, belonging either to the Potano or the Northern Utina tribe. A village site next to the mission archeological site may have been Cholupaha, visited by the de Soto Expedition in 1539.

As with other Timucua villages that became part of the Spanish mission system in Florida, the Indians of Santa Fe were greatly affected by epidemics, including bubonic plague in 1613–1617, yellow fever in 1649, smallpox in 1653, and measles in 1659. The Timucua Indians, which may have numbered 200,000 before their first contact with Europeans, were reduced from a population of 20,000 to 25,000 late in the 16th century to about 2,000 to 2,500 by the middle of the 17th century. After a rebellion by the Western Timucua in 1656, the Spanish hanged a number of the Indian leaders, including the village chief of Santa Fe. The original mission site was abandoned sometime around the middle of the 17th century, probably after the Timucuan rebellion, and the mission was moved to a new, currently unknown, location.

St. Augustine was dependent on food and other agricultural products from the missions, and on labor crews brought from the missions to the city. Timucua Province had originally stretched from the Atlantic coast westward to the border with Apalachee Province at the Aucilla River, and from what is now Marion County and the north end of Lake George on the St. Johns River northward into southern Georgia as far as the Altamaha River. As the Indian population closer to St. Augustine declined, the Spanish became increasingly dependent on corn and other agricultural supplies from Apalachee. Products from Apalachee reached St. Augustine by three different routes. One was completely overland, with Indians carrying everything on their backs, passing through Santa Fé. Products could also be taken to St. Marks on the Gulf of Mexico coast south of Apalchee, then carried by boat to Cofa at the mouth of the Suwannee River, thence up the Suwannee and Santa Fe Rivers to where the Santa Fe rose from its underground portion (at present-day River Rise Preserve State Park, near the Santa Fé mission), and then overland the rest of the way to St. Augustine. Finally, products could be carried by boat from St. Marks around the Florida peninsula to St. Augustine, bypassing all of the camino real, including the Santa Fe mission.

After the Timucua rebellion of 1656, a number of missions were closed, and others were relocated closer to the camino real connecting St. Augustine to Apalachee Province. The remaining Timucua Indians were gathered into the relocated missions, which became waystations along the camino real. Gabriel Diaz Vara Calderón, Bishop of Cuba, who visited the Florida missions in 1674–75, described Santa Fe de Toloca as the principal Timucuan mission. More epidemics struck the relocated village in 1675 and 1686. Indians from other tribes were resettled in the village during the second half of the century. The village and mission were abandoned after English colonists from the Province of Carolina and their Indian allies burned the village and the mission church on May 20, 1702, despite the defense offered by a small Spanish garrison and the local Indian militia.

== Archaeological site ==
The site (8AL190) that is now identified as the mission of Santa Fe de Toloca is located in the Robinson Sinks area of northwestern Alachua County, near where the Santa Fe River "sinks" to become a subterranean river in present-day O'Leno State Park. It was first investigated by a local family in the first half of the 20th century. A member of the family, J. C. Simpson, showed the site to University of Florida archaeologist John Goggin sometime around 1950. Goggin's students investigated the site, along with many others in the area, in the 1950s, but did not recognize it as a mission. An in-depth investigation led by Kenneth W. Johnson began in 1986. Originally thought to be a 17th-century farmstead or hamlet, the site was eventually recognized as a Spanish mission and, based on documentary evidence, identified as Santa Fé de Toloca.

The site of Santa Fe de Toloca was investigated by non-invasive testing, such as metal detectors, soil resistivity and remote sensing, surface collection and excavation. Plowing had destroyed some features of the site. Several possible structures were identified, as well as the old Spanish road, or camino real, a north–south road, known as the "Santa Fe Trail" and a cemetery (also one of the possible structures).

One structure was a rectangle approximately 8 m by 16 m in size. There appear to have been two different buildings on this location, both constructed in the first half of the 17th century, with one possibly oriented slightly differently from the other, but generally northwest to southeast. This was interpreted as an original building being refurbished or replaced by a later building on the same site. The structure had a hard-packed sandy clay floor, with a roof supported by posts. There is little evidence of walls, although small pieces of fired clay may represent chinking in a wattle or board wall. This structure was smaller than the church buildings typically found at other missions in Florida, but may have been a chapel or the convento (priest's house).

A second structure 16 to 20 m west of the first was smaller, about 4 m by 5 m in size. It had a red clay floor, and there may have been a clay wall forming a courtyard around the structure. A hearth at the south end of the structure showed evidence that it had been used as a smudge fire (used to keep mosquitoes away), rather than for cooking. This structure may have been the convento.

A third structure is less clearly understood. An area of clay, ashes and charcoal may be from the floor of a structure, or simply where debris was dumped. The location is just inside where remote sensing indicates that an old north–south road, the Santa Fe Trail, appears to fork into two parts that pass around either side of the mission. Johnson speculates that this possible structure was a gatehouse for the mission compound.

A cemetery held a number of burials. Post holes and the number of spikes and nails found in the cemetery indicate some type of structure stood over it. This may have been the church (burials were commonly made in the floor of a church at other missions), or an open pavilion covering the cemetery. The full size of the cemetery is unknown, but it appears to extend under a modern road. While only 18 burial pits were positively identified in the cemetery, the size of the cemetery from site observation and remote sensing yielded an estimated capacity of 180 to 320 burials.

A fifth structure was about 16 m by 28 m, and appears to have had a hearth at each end. Johnson suggests that it was a dormitory or barracks. A sixth structure 5 m from the fifth one was about 20 m by 22 m, but its use is not clear. These last two structures had wattle and daub walls, a type of construction for which there is no evidence for the previous structures. Other known sites immediately adjacent to, or within 0.5 km of, the Santa Fé site may also be part of the mission or of the village which it served.
