= Fig Springs mission site =

Archaeological site in Florida, US

- Location within Florida
- 29°58′2.47″N 82°46′33.82″W
- Location: Columbia County, Florida, USA
- Nearest city: Fort White, Florida

The Fig Springs mission site (8CO1) is an archaeological site in Ichetucknee Springs State Park, in Columbia County, Florida. It has been identified as the site of a Spanish mission to the Timucua people of the region, dating to the first half of the 17th century. Found within the historical territory of the Timucua people known as the Northern Utina, it is thought to be the Mission San Martín de Timucua, also known as San Martín de Ayacuto, which was founded in the important Northern Utina village of Ayacuto in 1608.

== Description ==
The Fig Springs site is adjacent to a short tributary connecting Fig Springs to the Ichetucknee River, about one mile downstream from the head springs of the Ichetucknee. An apparent midden with Spanish ceramics was discovered by John Mann Goggin in the tributary in 1949. In 1986, as part of a state project to locate sites visited by the Hernando de Soto expedition, a survey with limited excavations found burials, Spanish artifacts, and evidence of a clay floor, often associated with a mission church in Spanish Florida. In 1988, 1,341 auger holes were drilled at 10 m intervals over a 30 acres (12 ha) area that included the 1986 test excavation site. Artifacts and other materials recovered from the auger tests suggested the presence of a church building, missionary residence (convento), cemetery, plaza and native village. Spanish artifacts were found primarily in the northern part of the surveyed area, while Native American artifacts were found primarily in the southern part.

Extensive excavations were carried out in the village area in that year and the next (1988-1989). Excavations of part of the area described as a cemetery were conducted in 1990-1991. Post holes and post molds were found in excavating the Fig Springs site, but no clear patterns representing structures were found. One post hole with an entry trench (2.5 meters long and 1 meter wide) was over a meter deep. A charred stump of a post, 20 to 30 cm in diameter, was found in the hole. Storage or trash pits, including a bell-shaped pit, were also found. One pit was filled with charred corncobs, which yielded the latest radiocarbon dates from the site.

== Radiocarbon dates ==
Four samples of charcoal obtained in 1989 and 1990 from the South End part of the Fig Springs site had uncalibrated radiocarbon dates of 1000 Before Present (BP), 700 BP, 820 BP, and 110 BP, which yielded calibrated calendar date ranges with 2 sigma (standard deviations) of 980–1170, 1160–1290, 1220–1410, and 1420–1660, spanning the 10th through the 16th centuries.

A charred square post in a hole in the cemetery had an uncalibrated radiocarbon date of 450 BP, which yielded three calibrated calendar date ranges: 1334–1337, 1410–1520, and 1600–1616. (Note: See Radiocarbon calibration#Intercept for an illustration of how one radiocarbon date range can yield three calendar date ranges.) There is a 95% probability that the tree the post was fashioned from was cut between 1334 and 1616, with the most likely date being 1437.

== Culture ==
The definition of the Suwannee Valley culture (formerly called the "Indian Pond complex") came into focus as the result of studying artifacts recovered from pre-Columbian levels at Fig Springs. Ceramic shards recovered from the South End of the Fig Springs site, where four of the radiocarbon dated charcoal samples were taken, were strongly associated with the Suwannee Valley culture, with almost none representing the earlier Weeden Island culture, and less than 1% from the later Leon-Jefferson culture of the Spanish mission period. The most common ceramic type found at Fig Springs, which is the most distinctive ceramic type distinguishing Suwannee Valley culture from the neighboring Alachua culture, has been named "Fig Springs Roughened". A minor component of the Suwannee Valley ceramic assemblage has been named "Fig Springs Incised".

== Spanish mission ==
Analysis of sherds found at the site indicated that the mission was occupied during the first half of the 17th century. The archaeologists identified the site as likely to be that of San Martín de Timucua, which is known to have been founded in 1608 at Ayacuto (or Ayaocuto). Ayacuto was one of the five major towns that existed at the beginning of the 17th century in the Province of Timucua proper (also Northern Utina or Utina), which included north Florida north of the Santa Fe River from the St. Johns River in the east to the Aucilla River in the west. The mission of San Martín de Timucua does not appear in Spanish records after the Timucua rebellion of 1656. An earlier identification of the site as Santa Catalina de Afuerica, which is known to have existed in the area between 1675 and 1685, is less likely based on the evidence of the sherds.

The brother of the chief of Timucua Province ("Northern Utina") visited St. Augustin in 1597 and asked for a missionary to be assigned to the chiefdom. The Spanish gave him two iron axes and a hoe to use to build a church and house for a missionary. That September Friar Baltazar López was sent to Timucua for three months, presumably to the town that became the site of San Martín. There were not enough missionaries available in Spanish Florida to replace Fray López in Timucua until 1607. In 1607 Fray Martin Prieto visited Timucua repeatedly, arriving in the chief town of the province that became known as San Martín on May 1, 1608. It is unknown whether the church and convento used by Fray Prieto were built after his arrival, or a chapel and house built in 1597 survived, and a larger church was built after his arrival. The mission of San Martín existed until at least the Timucua Rebellion in 1656.

== Church ==
The 1988–1989 excavations led by Weisman revealed a mission church. The mission church (perhaps the first of two) was an open-air structure with a plank wall on the east end, and the other sides left open. Posts, about 10 cm square, supported a roof over an area about 10.5 m north-south and 8 m east-west. The floor had been cleared down to bare earth, and a clean sand subfloor about 20 cm thick supported a packed clay floor, which rose in steps from west to east. The structure apparently burned, and the remains were covered by a layer of clean sand. The construction of the church building is comparable to that of the church at the Apalachee Province mission of San Juan de Aspalaga (the Pine Tuft site [8JE2] in Jefferson County).

Weisman described the church as having three rooms. At the west end (the "front") was an "L-shaped" room with a clay floor. Saunders interprets Weisman's description to represent a small sanctuary enclosed by vertical boards and fronted by an open atrio, with a clay floor, that served as the nave of the church. A third room was a sand-filled area south of the enclosed sanctuary. The rooms were defined by the burnt remnants of posts and vertical boards. After the 1990–1991 fieldwork, Hoshower and Milanich concluded that the church identified by Weisman may have been replaced by a larger church to the north on what was originally identified as the cemetery.

Excavations of the mission site revealed a confusing number of architectural features. Saunders holds that, aside from an early chapel, the available evidence supports more than one narrative of the history of church structures at the mission site. One model is a large church with a single nave, surrounded by a narrow covered walkway, with an originally unpaved floor later covered with a clay pavement. A second model involves two small churches, one with a paved floor and one without. The church with the paved floor may have partially overlapped the site of the church with an unpaved floor. The third model is an aisled church, with interior posts supporting a wider roof than was feasible with an open nave.

Weisman identified a convento, or missionary's residence, northwest of the church he identified based on iron hardware, including a number of nails and spikes, which were found associated with a burned post, a fragment of an ornamental lock, and glass beads and fragments. Saunders did not find evidence of a convento at the site, and states that if there was one it may have eroded away.

== Cemetery ==
The 1988–1989 fieldwork identified a 20 m by 37 m cemetery north of that church, which included several rows of burials. Unlike several other Spanish missions in Florida, no burials were found in the floor of the church. In 1990 and 1991, excavations were conducted in the cemetery. The remains of 23 individuals were uncovered. (Note: All human remains (bones) were reburied on-site after being examined.) The excavated part of the cemetery had a high density of burials, with intrusive and multiple burials. The excavators also found architectural details such as nails, spikes, a post, and fragments of what may have been a clay floor. The remains of the clay floor and most of the artifacts were found on what had been the ground surface in the 17th century (10 to 15 cm below the present ground surface). Based on the density of graves uncovered in the excavated area, it was then estimated that the cemetery held about 900 burials. The investigators initially proposed the presence of small shelters over family or kin-group graves as an explanation for the artifacts and clay fragments. After the 1990–1991 fieldwork, Hoshower and Milanich concluded that the cemetery was somewhat smaller, 15 m by 25 m, with 400-500 graves, and may have been under the floor of a later church that replaced the church identified by Weisman just to the south. (Note: Although burial under a church floor was once considered exceptional for missions in Spanish Florida, more thorough excavation of mission sites has shown that such were common.) Individual graves were from 13 cm to 63 cm deep. The range of depths of graves and the frequency with which graves intruded on older burials suggested to the investigators that the cemetery was in use for many years.

== Burials ==
Bones from 23 individuals were excavated in 1990. Five were female adults, nine were male adults, four were adults of undetermined sex, and five were subadults, from an infant to a child of 13 to 15 years of age. Eight of the individuals were between 25 and 30 years of age at death. One female was over 45 years of age at death. The burials resembled those found at other missions in Spanish Florida. The skeletons were usually fully articulated, supine, and oriented to the long axis of the church. Individuals had their hands clasped beneath their jaws, or had their arms folded across their chest or abdomen. No evidence was found of coffins or burial shrouds. Only three burials had any grave goods. The oldest (more than 45 years of age) female was buried with a chert knife. Small blue beads were found near the feet of a 20 to 25 year old man. A wrought iron nail was found under the feet of a 30 to 35 year old male. Many pieces of a turtle's carapace were found scattered over that male's filled-in grave. Wrought-iron nails and fragments of nails and potsherds of Native American and Spanish ceramics were found on the 17-century ground surface and in the dirt that filled in the graves. Several of the burials were missing foot bones, probably from being disturbed by later burials.

The southern part of the excavated area had distinct burial pits. Some of the burials had disarticulated bones from other individuals mixed in the dirt used to fill the graves. One grave contained two individuals buried close together, with just 5 cm between their humeri (upper arms). The remains in the southern part of the excavated area were not as well preserved as those in the northern part.

The northern part of the excavated area held 14 graves, some of which were intrusive on older graves. Six of the burials formed a group, oriented north-south parallel to each other and evenly spaced, with the skulls between 39 and 59 cm deep. The investigators suggest that this resulted either from a single burial event, or from the graves being marked. One of the individuals in those graves was missing its feet, with the foot bones found in a later burial. Another burial held a 21 to 25 year old female with a 2.5 to 3 year old child in direct contact with the female, and a 4 to 5 year old child next to her. A 30 to 35 year old male was buried with his skull in direct contact with the left radius of the older child. The left humerus of that child was missing, while its left ulna was next to the adult male's skull. Deaths during one of the epidemics that periodically affected the missions in Spanish Florida may have been the cause of the group burials.

== Pathologies ==
Of the 23 individuals excavated in the cemetery, eight were complete, four were complete except for their feet, one was missing hands and feet, five were missing some combination of hands, feet, ribs, and/or vertebrae, and five were disarticulated fragments. Seven individuals showed no signs of pathology, but four of those consisted only of fragments of skulls. Twelve of the individuals showed periosteal reactions, the growth of new bone in response to injury or chronic irritation. Seven individuals had porotic hyperostosis, porous or spongy bone in the skull, possible evidence of malnutrition. Six individuals had osteoarthritis. Other skeletal pathologies found included osteoporosis, Schmorl's nodes (vertebral disc extrusions), and osteomas, benign bone tumors.

Instances of trauma found included a broken and remodeled bone in a hand, a depressive fracture of the glabella (the bone between the eyes), and a compressive fracture of the C3 and C4 cervical vertebrae in an individual for whom only elements of the spine were found.

Nineteen of the individuals had fairly intact teeth, of which 15 had enamel hypoplasias, deficient development of enamel on teeth. The structure of the observed hypoplasias indicate that most of them formed between two and five years of age. This was taken as evidence that the hypoplasias resulted from nutritional stress associated with weaning. It appears that the incidence of hypoplasia increased over time at the Fig Springs site. Sixteen out of 381 teeth (4.7%) had cavities. This rate is low compared to other Native American populations of the Spanish mission period that practiced maize agriculture, as the residents of Fig Springs were reported to do.

== Sources ==
- Hoshower, Lisa M.; Milanich, Jerald T. (1993). "Excavations in the Fig Springs Mission Burial Area". In McEwan, Bonnie G. (ed.). The Spanish Missions of La Florida. Gainesville, Florida: University Press of Florida. pp. 217–243. ISBN 978-0-8130-1232-2.
- Saunders, Rebecca (December 1996). "Mission-Period Settlement Structure: A test of the Model at San Martin de Timucua". Historical Archaeology. 30: 24–36. doi:10.1007/BF03373595 – via Springer Link.
- Weisman, Brent R. (1993). "Archaeology of Fig Springs Mission, Ichetucknee Springs State Park". In McEwan, Bonnie G. (ed.). The Spanish Missions of La Florida. Gainesville, Florida: University Press of Florida. pp. 165–192. ISBN 0-8130-1232-5.
- Worth, John E. (2012). "An Overview of the Suwannee Valley Culture". In Ashley, Keith; White, Nancy Marie (eds.). Late Prehistoric Florida: Archaeology at the Edge of the Mississippian World. Gainesville, Florida: University Press of Florida. pp. 149–171. ISBN 978-0-8130-4014-1.
