= Suwannee Valley culture =

Archaeological culture in Florida

The Suwannee Valley culture is defined as a Late Woodland Southeast period archaeological culture in north Florida, dating from around 750 to European contact. The core area of the culture was found in an area roughly corresponding to present-day Suwannee and southern and central Columbia counties. It was preceded by the McKeithen Weeden Island culture and followed by the Spanish mission period Leon-Jefferson culture.

== Definition ==
The Suwannee Valley culture was defined in the 1990s, as excavations revealed a unique ceramic assemblage. The core area of the Suwannee Valley culture was roughly bounded on the north, west and southwest by a great bend in the Suwannee River, and on the south by the Santa Fe River. The Suwannee Valley culture probably included the south bank of the Santa Fe River, in northern Alachua County, Florida, where it bordered the similar Alachua culture. It also extended westwards to the Aucilla River, beyond which lay the Fort Walton (950-Spanish mission period) culture and eastwards towards the St. Johns culture. The Aucilla River appears to have served as both the western boundary of the Suwannee Valley culture as well as an interaction zone between the Suwannee Valley and Fort Walton cultures. To the north, in southern Georgia, was an otherwise undefined culture area characterized by the Carter Complicated Stamped ceramic series.

The Suwannee Valley ceramic assemblage has some elements from the adjacent Wakulla and Alachua cultures, but is distinct from both. The Suwannee Valley culture developed out of the McKeithen culture. Wakulla ceramics have been found at early Suwannee Valley sites, and Fort Walton ceramics are present at the westernmost Suwannee Valley culture sites.

== Sites ==
In the early part of the Suwannee Valley culture, settlement patterns became more scattered, with smaller sites, than in the preceding McKeithen Weeden Island culture. A similar pattern occurred in the adjacent Wakulla culture. This change in settlement pattern may be associated with increased cultivation of crops. Later in the Suwannee Valley culture period, in the Island Pond phase, larger settlements, associated with burial mounds, developed.

Only six Suwannee Valley culture sites have been well described: Fig Springs (8CO1), Indian Pond (8CO229), Parnell Mound (8CO326), Suwannee Sinks (8SU377), Floyd's Mound (8MD6), and South Mound (8MD354). The Fig Springs South End Village has yielded four radiocarbon dates from the 10th century to the 16th century. This sub-site is essentially devoid of McKeithen Weeden Island and Leon Jeffereson ceramics, and of Spanish artifacts, and appears to have been occupied for some six centuries entirely within the Suwannee Valley period. The Floyd's Mound Site has yielded three radiocarbon dates from sooted ceramic sherds, which date between A.D. 1156 and 1279. These ceramics were recovered from beneath an upper layer which included Fort Walton ceramics, suggesting the people of this site interacted with the Fort Walton peoples west of the Aucilla River.

Suwannee Valley ceramics more closely resemble the ceramics of the Alachua culture than of the other neighboring cultures, Fort Walton and St. Johns. Suwannee Valley ceramics are generally of a "rough" utilitarian form, as contrasted with the range of elaborately decorated and complex Mississippian ceramics of the Fort Walton culture and of the succeeding Leon Jefferson culture. Nearly all Suwannee Valley sites also lack platform mounds characteristic of Mississippian cultures such as Fort Walton and St. Johns. The only known Suwannee Valley culture site at which a platform mound is present, the Floyd's Mound site (8MD6), is also the westernmost of the Suwannee Valley culture sites, and the presence of Fort Walton ceramics at the site suggests cultural interaction and influence from the Fort Walton culture west of the Aucilla.

== Historic ==
In historical times, after contact with Europeans, the core area of the Suwannee Valley culture was occupied by the Timucua proper, now generally known as the Northern Utina. The area west of the Suwannee River to the Aucilla River, which may have been part of the Suwannee Valley culture, was occupied by the Yustaga nearer the region of the Suwannee River itself, and in the extreme west of the Suwannee Valley cultural region by the small chiefdom of Asile. The chiefdom of Asile was described in the accounts of the Hernando de Soto expedition as being "subject to Apalachee", suggesting this westernmost Timucuan group regularly interacted with the Apalachee.

After the establishment of Spanish missions in the Timucua (proper) and Yustaga provinces, Suwannee Valley ceramics were eventually displaced by Leon-Jefferson ceramics. During this period, the chiefdom of Asile continued to interact with the Apalachee, and historical evidence indicates that the chief of Asile held land on the western side of the Aucilla River during the seventeenth century.

Archaeological evidence for Mississippian influence in the Suwannee Valley culture is present in the westernmost Suwannee Valley sites nearest the Aucilla River. The political organization of the Timucua/Northern Utina and Yustaga people at the time of European contact, and for more than a century afterwards, was Mississippian as well. The provinces were organized in a hierarchy of chiefdoms. Primary chiefdoms consisted of some 750 to 1,500 people living in a cluster of communities, and were under regional chiefdoms and councils. Chiefly and noble ranks were inherited. Warriors and ball players could also achieve elevated status.
