= Ichetucknee River =

River in Florida, United States

Coordinates: 29.9324551°N 82.8001241°W

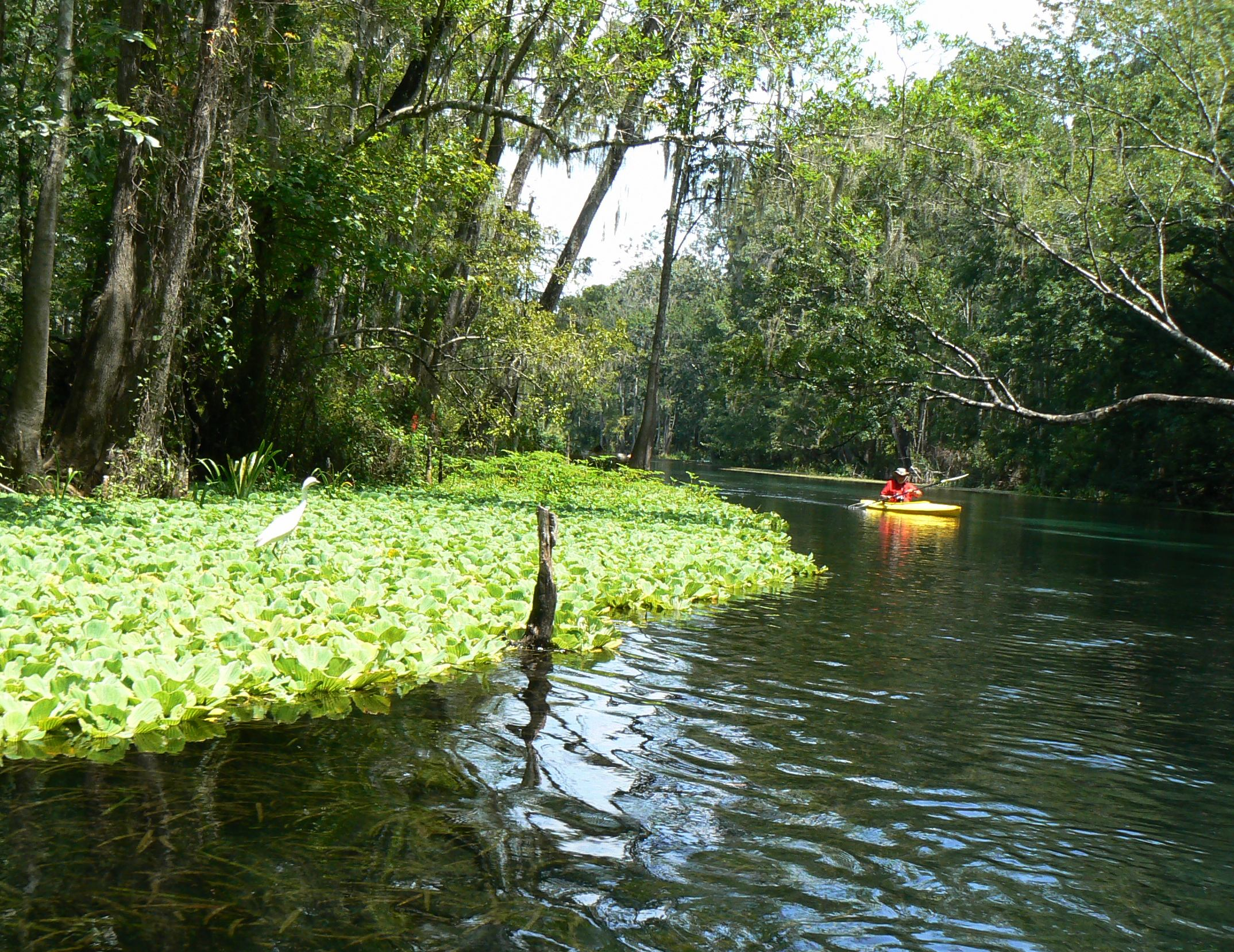
- Ichetucknee River at Ichetucknee Springs State Park, Florida, August 2006

Location
- Country: United States
- State: Florida

Physical characteristics
- Source
  - location: North central Florida
  - elevation: 13 ft (4.0 m)
- Mouth
  - location: Santa Fe River
- Length: 6 mi (9.7 km)

The Ichetucknee River is a spring-fed, pristine river in North Central Florida. Located near Fort White, Florida, The Ichetucknee Springs State Park is located in Columbia and Suwannee counties. The entire 6 miles (9.7 km) of the river average 20 feet (6.1 m) wide, 5 feet (1.5 m) deep and most of the 6 miles lie within the boundaries of the Ichetucknee Springs State Park while the rest is to the south of US Highway 27. Three Rivers Estates Property Owners (TREPO) is the property owner association that manages the area along the private side of the river as it travels and flows into the Santa Fe River.

The water in the river is crystal-clear and is 72 °F (22 °C) year-round. There are nine named springs within the Ichetucknee Springs group with an average total flow of 212 million gallons per day. The group includes: Ichetucknee Springs, Cedar Head Spring, Blue Hole Spring, Roaring Springs, Singing Springs, Boiling Spring, Grassy Hole Springs, Mill Pond Spring, and Coffee Spring. The Ichetucknee is a tributary of the Santa Fe River, which in turn flows into the Suwannee River before emptying into the Gulf of Mexico.

The park restricts launch and end points along the river, permitting a tube/raft excursion of 45 min, 1.5 or 3 hours. A variety of commercial vendors, located outside the entrance to the park, rent tubes and rafts for a modest fee. Park wildlife includes: North American river otter, North American beaver, turtle, ibis, wood stork, egret, great blue heron, cormorant, anhinga, belted kingfisher, limpkin, wild turkey, wood duck, white-tailed deer, raccoon, nine-banded armadillo, wild boar, The fish are primarily bream, bluegill, largemouth bass, alligator gar, mullet, and catfish. West Indian manatees have been seen in the winter months.

== Etymology ==
The name is probably derived from a Muskogean language, possibly from Creek hvcce-tuccenē "three streams". Another widespread etymology translates it as "beaver pond", perhaps with Creek stems ue- "water" and ecas- "beaver." A Hitchiti informant to anthropologist John R. Swanton pronounced the location Oetcotukni, suggesting a possible derivation from Creek ue-cutoknē "lumpy water", although he translated it as "where there is a pond of water".

== History ==
The 17th-century Spanish Fig Springs mission site has been identified in the park. This is probably the site of Mission San Martín de Timucua, which served the Timucua chiefdom known as the Northern Utina. Plans to reconstruct the mission and open it to the public as an interpretational site were dropped. Benjamin Hawkins listed We-cho-took-[n]e as a Seminole settlement in 1799. The area was abandoned in the mid 19th century due to war, but was later held by American settlers.

The river was a popular swimming and tubing location for locals and University of Florida students up through the 1960s, which led to litter and other problems. The State of Florida purchased the property in 1970 and began a cleanup and restoration project. It was declared a National Natural Landmark in 1972, and became a tourist attraction.

== Current threats ==
In the early 1990s, the springs were showing signs of an even more disturbing degradation: a progressive decline in water quality. The Florida Department of Environmental Protection commissioned studies which showed that nutrient levels were steadily increasing. Additionally, some swimmers and tubers began to report strange skin rashes, possibly caused by algae fed by nutrients introduced into the aquifer.

== See also ==
Ichetucknee Springs State Park
