= Old Hell Lake =

Lake in Long County, Georgia, United States

- Location within Georgia Location within the United States
- Location: Long County, Georgia
- Coordinates: 31°33′23″N 081°41′18″W
- Basin countries: United States

Old Hell Lake is a body of water in Long County, Georgia, United States, occurring at an elevation of roughly 15 feet above mean sea level.

== Location ==
The lake is located approximately 11 miles from the city of Ludowici. Water flows from the lake into a tributary of the Altamaha River. The point where that short tributary flows into the Altamaha is known as Old Hell Bight.

== Etymology ==
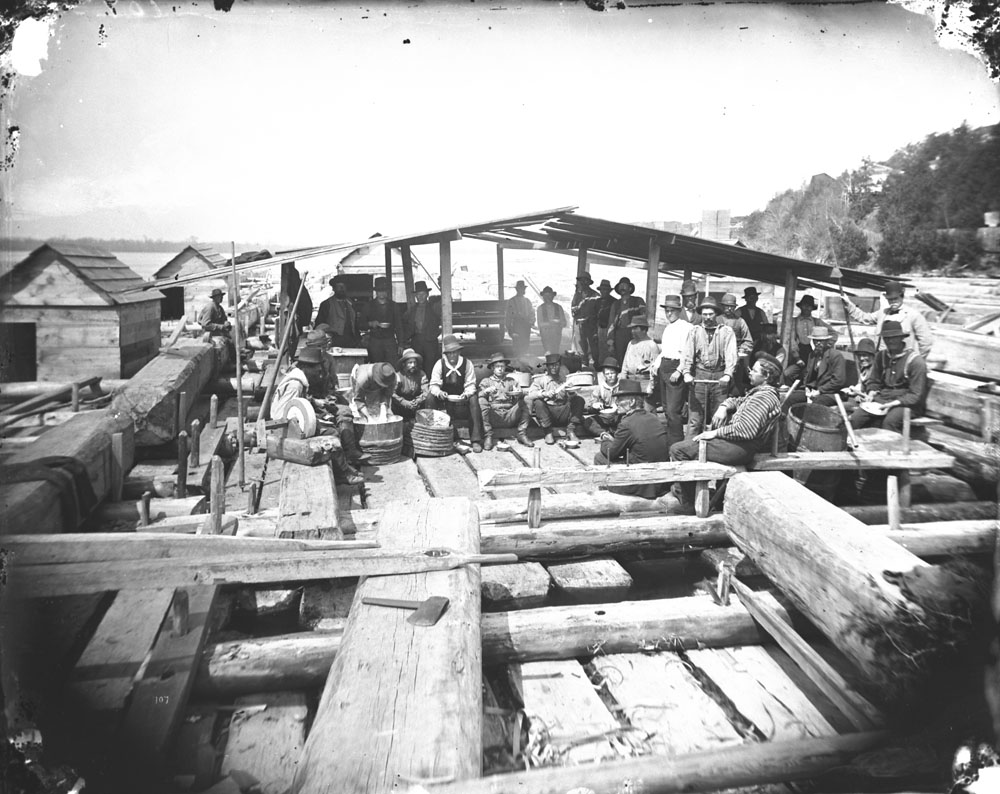
Timber Raft 1880

There are a number of possible origins for the name. One suggests that it refers to the adjacent great "hellish" swamp. But the more likely source is thought to be from a time in Georgia history when timber rafts where a common sight on the Altamaha River. It would be a "riverman's moniker" referencing the Bight as a particularly troublesome bend in the river, with associated dangerous currents, where a pilot and crew might lose "their wages, their timber, and occasionally their lives". So it is most likely that Old Hell Bight was named first, then influenced the naming of the adjacent lake.

== See also ==
- Altamaha River
