= Agua Dulce people =

Timucua tribe in Spanish Florida

Utina
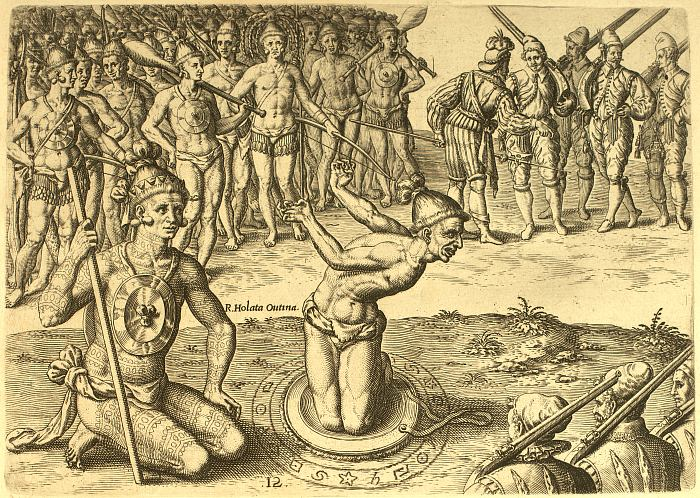
- One of Theodor de Bry's engravings, supposedly based on drawings by Jacques LeMoyne, depicting Chief Utina consulting his "sorcerer" before battle

Total population
- Extinct as tribe

Regions with significant populations
- North Florida along the middle St. Johns River

Languages
- Timucua language, Agua Fresca dialect

Religion
- Native

Related ethnic groups
- Timucua

The Agua Dulce or Agua Fresca (Freshwater) were a Timucua people of northeastern Florida. They lived in the St. Johns River watershed north of Lake George, and spoke a dialect of the Timucua language also known as Agua Dulce.

In the 1560s, Agua Dulce villages were organized into the chiefdom of Utina, one of the region's most powerful and prominent forces in the early days of European colonization in Florida. Utina had dealings with the French colony of Fort Caroline, and later allied with the Spanish of St. Augustine, who established several missions in its territory. However, the chiefdom declined significantly in the last decades of the 16th century, and the confederacy fragmented into at least three chiefdoms.

The main body of the tribe withdrew south along the St. Johns River, and were known as the Agua Dulce to the Spanish. This chiefdom was largely abandoned by 1680. Additionally, a group of Christianized Agua Dulce migrated east towards St. Augustine, and became known as the Tocoy, but this small chiefdom disappeared by 1616. The Acuera, who spoke a different dialect but appear to have been part of the Utina confederacy in the days of French settlement, also broke away and established their own chiefdom. The Acuera proved more sustainable than the Agua Dulce and Tocoy chiefdoms, but had collapsed by 1680.

== Name ==
Agua Dulce or Agua Fresca (both meaning "Freshwater") was a Spanish term for Timucua living along the freshwater lower St. Johns River, as opposed to the Mocama or "Salt Water" who lived along the coast. The Utina chiefdom of the late 16th century is so called after its leader at the time of contact with the Europeans, Olata Ouae Utina; other spellings of the name include "Outina". The name "Utina" does not appear to be a designation specific to this group; uti-na means "my land" in Timucuan. The Saturiwa, another Timucua chiefdom who were enemies of the Utina, called them "Thimogona" or "Tymangoua", which is possibly the origin of the name "Timucua". The French followed the Saturiwa in this use, but later, the Spanish used the word "Timucua" for a much wider area of northern Florida, which they incorporated into their mission system as the Timucua Province.

In the 17th century the Spanish thus came to know the principal tribe in the Timucua Province, who lived to the north of the former Utina chiefdom, as the Timucua. At this time, the descendants of Chief Utina's people were known instead as the Agua Dulce. In the 20th century, after the name "Timucua" had come to be applied to all speakers of the Timucua language, scholars began using "Utina" as a generic term for the group the Spanish had known as the Timucua. However, this has caused confusion between the 16th-century Utina chiefdom and the "Timucua proper", who were never known as Utina by their contemporaries. Scholars Jerald Milanich and Ken Johnson have suggested classing the two groups as eastern Utina and Northern Utina, respectively. According to scholar John H. Hann, the village that served as the center of the chiefdom was later referred to as Nyaautina by historical sources.

== Area ==
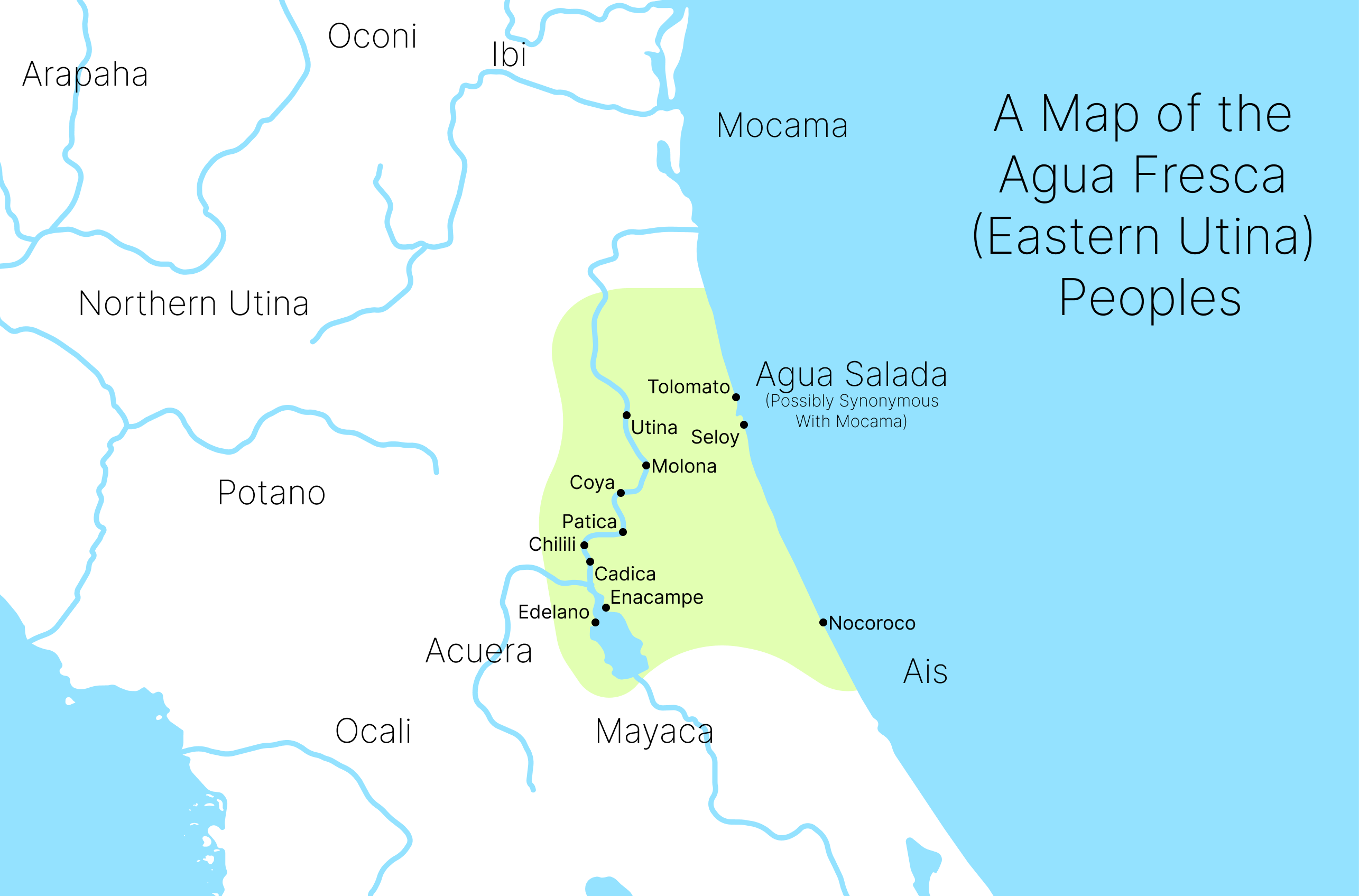
A map of the Agua Dulce peoples

The Agua Dulce lived along the St. Johns River, from north of present-day Palatka to Lake George. They occupied an area to the west in what are now Clay and Putnam Counties, and on freshwater lagoons and inlets along the Atlantic coast.

The French record that in the 1560s Chief Utina had more than forty other village chiefs as his vassals. His main village was located about seventeen miles to the west of the St. Johns, perhaps near George's Lake (distinct from Lake George) in northwestern Putnam County. The place name Etoniah, derived from Utina, still survives through this area, for instance in Etoniah Creek. However, as this area is well north of the distribution of late prehistoric archaeological sites, which are concentrated between about Palatka and Lake George, it is possible that the Utina had gained control of this northern stretch relatively recently. Other villages subject to Chief Utina were Coya and Molona on the St. Johns; moving upriver to the south were the villages of Patica, Chilili, and Enacape. French sources record that the Acuera, another Timucua tribe on the Oklawaha River farther south and who spoke a different dialect, were also part of the Utina chiefdom, as were groups on the east side of the St. Johns.

To the west of the Utina, in the area around present-day Gainesville, were the Potano, another Timucua group who were enemies of the Utina. Down the St. Johns to the north, in an area stretching roughly from what is now downtown Jacksonville to the mouth of the river, were another enemy chiefdom, the Saturiwa. The stretch of river between about Palatka and Jacksonville was relatively less populated, and may have served as a boundary between the Utina and the Saturiwa. Up the river south of Lake George were the Mayaca, who were culturally similar to the Utina but did not speak the Timucua language and were more closely aligned with the Ais of the Atlantic coast.

== Early history and European contact ==
Chief Utina defeats the Potano with the aid of French forces. This engraving supposedly based on an original painting by Jacques le Moyne is unlikely to depict Native American warfare accurately

The area had been populated for thousands of years. An archaeological culture known as the St. Johns culture emerged around 500 BC, and was still extant at the time of contact with the Europeans. At some point after the 8th century, Mississippian culture models, common throughout what is now the eastern United States, began to proliferate in Florida, and Mississippian-style chiefdoms emerged. Archaeologists have uncovered two clusters of St. Johns-related sites along the river dating to the late prehistoric period. These correspond closely with the Utina and Saturiwa chiefdoms described by the Europeans, suggesting they were long established. The Agua Dulce built burial mounds and left large shell middens, among the largest found in the United States. They grew crops, but were not as dependent on agriculture as were tribes to the north; those living on the lagoons along the coast may not have practiced agriculture at all.

The Acuera, one of the peoples noted by the French as part of Chief Utina's alliance, encountered the conquistador Hernando de Soto's expedition in 1539. De Soto stole corn from the Acuera while camped out in the nearby town of Ocale. However, extensive contact with Europeans did not occur until 1564, when the French Huguenots from the recently established Fort Caroline in present-day Jacksonville first visited the area. The French noted that at this time all the villages along the middle St. Johns, as well as some farther into the interior such as those of the Acuera, were part of a chiefdom ruled by a young leader named Utina. Though only 25 years old, Utina had sovereignty over forty other chiefs and their villages, and was one of the most powerful figures in northern Florida. The exact nature of Utina's chiefdom is unclear. He may have been the leader of an integrated polity, or he may have been simply the leading chief in a confederacy of smaller chiefdoms. In any case he was treated as a powerful leader by the French and Spanish.

At this time the Utina appear to have been at war with two other powerful chiefdoms: the Saturiwa to the north and the Potano to the west. The French had forged a treaty of friendship with Chief Saturiwa, in whose territory their fort stood, but governor René Goulaine de Laudonnière still sought the favor of the powerful Utina. He sent an expedition that made contact with the Utina and aided them in an assault on the Potano. Later he refused to aid Saturiwa in an offensive against the Utina, straining relations with him. However, when French stores were running low in the spring of 1565, Utina exploited their situation to coerce Laudonnière into sending more military aid. When they realized that Utina was manipulating them, the desperate French kidnapped the chief in order to ransom him for supplies. This led to battle between the French and the Utina, which had grave effects for both sides. The French were unable to secure much food, and eventually released Utina.

Later that year, the Spanish, recently established in St. Augustine, besieged Fort Caroline and ejected the French from Florida. The Utina quickly allied with the Spanish. In 1567, the Spanish assisted them against a coalition of the Saturiwa, Potano, and Mayaca, joining them in driving the Potano from their main village. However, over the next two decades the Spanish paid little attention to the Utina. Concurrently the once-powerful confederacy declined significantly and fragmented.

== Fragmentation ==
By the time Franciscan missionary efforts began in the area in the 1590s, there had been a significant decrease in both population and in the number of remaining villages in the Agua Dulce area. Moreover, there appear to have been at least three smaller, independent chiefdoms in what had formerly been Utina territory. The details of the decline are unclear, but the more devastating warfare and diseases introduced by the Europeans probably contributed. The core part of the chiefdom remained inhabited, but the declining population appears to have withdrawn south, with the administrative center shifting to the village of Antonico. The Spanish referred to the inhabitants as the Agua Dulce or Agua Fresca, the Freshwater tribe. Northern villages that had not been abandoned were at that time under the authority of the Christian chiefs of Tocoy. The Tocoy chiefdom established a new town to the east, closer to St. Augustine. Additionally, the Acuera, who part of Chief Utina's confederacy in the 1560s, had become an independent chiefdom.

=== Agua Dulce chiefdom ===
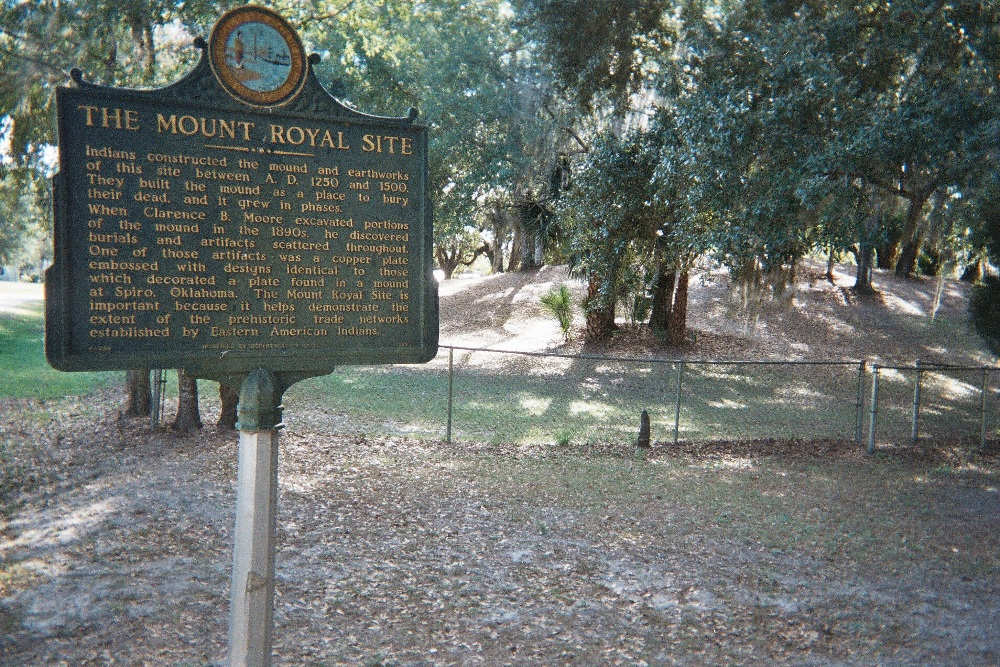
The Mount Royal site, probably the town of Enacape

The Agua Dulce chiefdom inhabited a territory comprising the former center of the Utina chiefdom in what the Spanish called the Agua Dulce province. By 1595 Chief Utina appears to have been succeeded, at some remove or another, by the Christian chief Antonico, who ruled from a village also known as Antonico southeast of the old main village. Its precise location is unclear, but it certainly would have been part of Utina's confederacy if it existed at that time. Most of the northern villages, including the main town, were evidently abandoned, and the number of villages in the chiefdom were reduced to about six, situated between the Palatka area and Lake George. In 1595, Franciscan friars founded a mission in Antonico village, incorporating Agua Dulce province into the mission system. The chiefdom maintained good relations with the Spanish, although it had no permanent friar from 1597 to 1605. In this period, the Agua Dulce population had shrunk drastically to about 200-225 people.

By 1616, the administrative center of the Agua Dulce had shifted south again, to Enacape (perhaps the Mount Royal site near Lake George). Anthropologist John E. Worth suggests the transfer occurred as part of the succession to Chief Antonico, who had apparently died. Antonico was succeeded by his nephew, Juan de Contreras, whose mother was evidently the chief of Enacape. Juan may have moved the administrative center due to his filial connections to the town. The Spanish established a mission there, San Antonio de Enacape.

By the 1640s, the Agua Dulce Province had declined so much that it was merged with two others, Acuera and the remote Mayaca, to form the Ibiniuti Province. This change may have been dictated by the Spanish administration, but the fact that it had a Timucua name suggests the native political structure may also have changed based on the severe population changes. In this period the distant province became a haven for Timucua fleeing the colonial labor system along the Spanish royal road, the Camino Royal, as well as Chisca people invited to the area by the Spanish. In 1656, the Franciscans withdrew their friars from the entire province and established the mission town of Salamototo, which drew Indians from across the upper St. Johns. Though some Agua Dulce may have remained in their homeland, others evidently relocated to Salamototo. San Antonio de Enacape was occupied by Yamassee refugees in the 1680 mission lists. As with other Timucua peoples, remaining Agua Dulce probably mixed with other peoples and lost their independent identity.

=== Tocoy chiefdom ===
The village of Tocoy on the St. Johns River became the center of an independent chiefdom in the later 16th century. Tocoy was located due west of St. Augustine and east of the old Utina village. It was thus presumably part of Utina's chiefdom in the 1560s, though at the northernmost bounds. Shortly after the foundation of St. Augustine, the chief of Tocoy, Pedro Márquez, moved to a new village closer to the Spanish settlement, known as San Sebastián. Consequently, Pedro and his successor were often known as Chief of Tocoy and San Sebastián. Pedro was one of the first chiefs to submit to Spanish authority, and converted to Christianity even before missionary efforts began. His son and successor Gaspar Márquez later noted that his father and mother had been "some of the first Christians baptized in these provinces", and had requested missionaries and built churches in San Sebastián. The relocation to San Sebastián and the alignment with the Spanish evidently elevated the profile of the Chiefs of Tocoy, who had probably been marginal in the Utina chiefdom, and facilitated the break.

The Spanish established missions in both Tocoy and San Sebastián in 1587; these, together with the missions to the Mocama to north, were among the first successful missions established in Spanish Florida. Gaspar Márquez succeeded his father around 1595, and maintained Pedro's good relations with the Spanish. He continued to support the mission effort, and sent a petition to the King of Spain in 1606, but his people were in a state of precipitous decline. In 1606, there were only about 90 people left in the chiefdom.

Neither of Tocoy's missions is mentioned in records after 1608, and Tocoy was abandoned by 1616, leaving the area virtually unpopulated. The area was merged with Agua Dulce Province, and any survivors may have relocated to Mission Nombre de Dios north of St. Augustine. Because of its strategic location as a river crossing on the St. Johns, the Spanish relocated other Timucua to a new mission, San Diego de Helaca, in the former Tocoy area. This too was abandoned by the late 1650s, the remaining population relocated to the new multi-ethnic mission town of Salamototo. The short-lived chiefdom of Tocoy left its mark on the landscape in the name of the San Sebastian River, the small river that flows into the Intracoastal Waterway where the erstwhile village of San Sebastián stood.

=== Acuera chiefdom ===
The Acuera, who lived along Ocklawaha River, seem have become independent of the Agua Dulce chiefdom by the start of the 16th century, and founded at least one chiefdom of their own. The French sources attest that they were part of Utina's confederacy in the 1560s, though Worth notes that the level of control Utina exercised over them is arguable. Francisco Pareja noted that the Acuera spoke their own dialect of the Timucua language (Acuera), distinct from the Agua Dulce dialect. The Acuera did not experience demographic decline nearly as quickly as the Agua Dulce or Tocoy chiefdoms, perhaps partially because of their remote location in the Florida interior and their less frequent contact with the Europeans. In the early mission period they may have had a population between 2,500 and 4,500. As such, Acuera represents one of the simpler, localized chiefdoms that proved sustainable well after more integrated societies such as Utina's confederacy had fallen.

Spanish records from the late 16th century indicate that Acuera village was ruled by a cacica (female chief). The chiefdom may have been relatively unintegrated. Some villages in the Acuera Province were missionized years before the main town, and some village chiefs rendered their obedience to the Spanish before the Cacica of Acuera village had done so. According to Worth, the Tucururu dialect, which Francisco Pareja noted was similar to but distinct from Acuera, may have been spoken in the Acuera Province, perhaps around the village of Tucuru. As such, the villages of the province may have been largely independent and only loosely associated with the main town. Alternately, the missionized villages, all located in the eastern part of the province, may have represented another small chiefdom or chiefdoms situated between Acuera and Agua Dulce.

The Spanish established Mission San Blas de Avino in the town of Avino by 1612, but it was abandoned not long after. By 1640, the population had decreased to the point that Acuera was joined with Agua Dulce and Mayaca into the Ibiniuti province.

By 1655 there were two further missions, Santa Lucia de Acuera in the main village and San Luis de Eloquale in Eloquale. Both of these were abandoned by 1680, and like Agua Dulce, the Acuera Province was merged into the larger Timucua Province. Any survivors may have relocated closer to St. Augustine, perhaps to the Puebla de Timucua, and lost their independent identity.
