= Potano =

Native American chiefdom in Florida, US

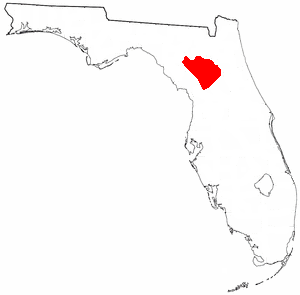
- Approximate area occupied by the Potano tribe at the time of European contact

Total population
- Extinct as a tribe

Regions with significant populations
- United States (Florida)

Languages
- Potano Timucua dialect

Religion
- Native

Related ethnic groups
- Timucua peoples

The Potano (also Potanou or Potavou, Timucua: Potano "That is happening now") tribe lived in north-central Florida at the time of first European contact. Their territory included what is now Alachua County, the northern half of Marion County and the western part of Putnam County. This territory corresponds to that of the Alachua culture, which lasted from about 700 until 1700. The Potano were among the many tribes of the Timucua people, and spoke a dialect of the Timucua language.

== Early European contact ==
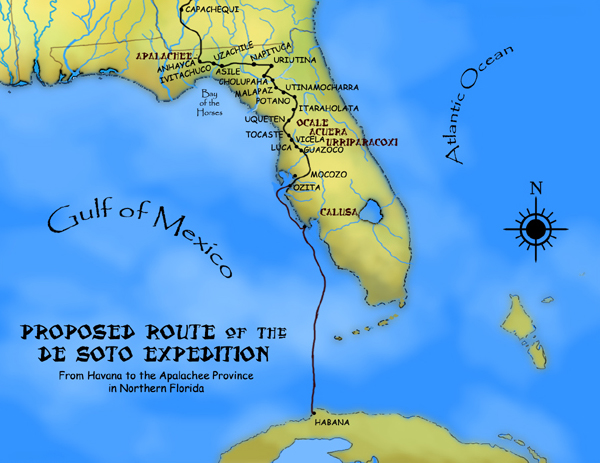
A proposed route for the first leg of the de Soto Expedition, based on Charles M. Hudson map of 1997

The Potano being defeated by Chief Utina with the assistance of French forces. This image supposedly based on an original etching by Jacques le Moyne is unlikely to depict Native American warfare accurately

The Pánfilo de Narváez expedition passed to the west of Potano territory in 1528. While not engaging with the Potano, the Spanish incursion spread new infectious diseases and incited warfare by competing tribes in the area. In 1539 Hernando de Soto led an army through Potano territory. There were 700 or more people in de Soto's army. They forced villagers to give up stored food to them. By the time de Soto's army reached Potano territory, he was intent on spending the winter in the Apalachee domain, and the army passed through quickly. The army passed through Potano towns that the Spanish called Itaraholata (or Ytara) (probably in western Marion County), Potano (near present-day Evinston), Utinamochana (or Utinama or Untinamocharro) (west of present-day Gainesville, near Moon Lake), Mala-paz (near the present-day city of Alachua) and Cholupa (in the Robinson Sinks near the Santa Fe River in northwestern Alachua County). (Note: Holata was a widespread term for chief in the southeastern United States. The Spanish generally applied the same name to a chief and to his chiefdom. Thus, Itaraholata is equivalent to "Chief Itara". Utina was a Timucuan word for "chief", while ma was a suffix which was also sometimes attached to holata (holatama).(Hann: 75) Mala-paz is Spanish for "bad peace".)

At the time the French established Fort Caroline, the Potano were at war with the Utina, a chiefdom ruled by Chief Utina or Outina. The French supported the Utina and helped defeat the Potano. After Spain expelled France from Florida, it also supported the Utina. In 1584 the Potano killed a Spanish captain leading an invasion into Potano territory. To punish them, a second Spanish expedition attacked and killed many Potano and drove the rest from their towns. After that attack, the town of Potano was moved to the Fox Pond site near the Devil's Millhopper northwest of Gainesville.

In the 1580s Spanish Franciscan missionaries reached the Potano, first with visits by an itinerant missionary. A visita (a mission without a resident missionary) named Apula was established in the town of Potano, but was destroyed in the Spanish raid of 1584 or 1585. A couple of visitas existed in Potano territory in the 1590s. In 1606 Spanish missionaries established a doctrina (a mission with one or more resident missionaries), San Francisco de Potano, in the relocated town of Potano. This was the first doctrina west of the St. Johns River. Another doctrina, San Miguel de Potano, and a visita, Santa Ana de Potano, were soon established within a few miles of San Francisco de Potano. Another visita, San Buenaventura de Potano, was established at the former site of the town of Potano in 1607 or 1608 by Fray Francisco Pareja. The missionaries reported that they had baptized more than 1,000 adult Potanos by 1607. The missions of San Miguel and San Buenaventura disappeared from Spanish records within a few years.

In 1656 the Potano participated in the Timucuan rebellion against the Spanish authorities. The Spanish prevailed after eight months. During the fighting, they had burned most of the Timucuan towns and missions. After the rebellion, the Spanish re-established the Potano missions (San Francisco and Santa Ana). In 1672 the Potano suffered many deaths from an unidentified disease. One colonial estimate figured the population of the Potano at 3,000 in 1650. By 1675, only 160 people were surviving at the two Potano missions.

Following the Timucuan rebellion, the Spanish made many land grants to their colonists in areas no longer used by the reduced Potano population. There is evidence of twenty-five Spanish-owned cattle ranches in Timucuan territory, including several in Potano territory. Much of the evidence for these ranches was recorded as Potano complaints to Spanish officials that cattle were running loose and eating village crops.

By 1685, tribes from north of Florida, supplied with arms and often joined by English settlers from the Province of Carolina, were raiding Potano territory, burning villages, killing some Potano and carrying others away to be sold as slaves in Charles Towne. These raids continued into the 18th century. The Spanish mission system across northern Florida collapsed after 1704. Some surviving Potano may have reached the mission at St. Augustine as refugees, but the Potano effectively became extinct as a tribe at that time.

== See also ==
- List of sites and peoples visited by the Hernando de Soto Expedition

== Works cited ==
- Hann, John H. (1996). A History of the Timucua Indians and Missions. Gainesville, Florida: University Press of Florida. ISBN 0-8130-1424-7.
- Milanich, Jerald T. (1995). Florida Indians and the Invasion from Europe. Gainesville, Florida: The University Press of Florida. ISBN 0-8130-1360-7.
- Milanich, Jerald T. (1999). The Timucua. Wiley-Blackwell. ISBN 0-631-21864-5.
