= Santa Isabel de Utinahica =

Spanish mission in Georgia (US state)

Santa Isabel de Utinahica (ca. 1610 – ca. 1640) was a 17th-century Spanish mission believed by the Fernbank Museum of Natural History to be located in modern-day Telfair County, Georgia, near Jacksonville. It served the Utinahica tribe, who lived in the area. The small mission was a part of a series of missions set up in what was then the northern reaches of the Spanish colony of Spanish Florida, similar to the Spanish Missions in California or Mexico.

Operating for approximately two decades in the early 17th century, the mission was a religious outpost consisting of one Catholic friar sent out to convert and monitor the native people at the edges of the colony. The name Utinahica was taken from the local Native American chiefdom, themselves a part of the Timucua people and possibly ancestors of the current Creek people.

The mission's exact location is not presently known with certainty. In April 2006 the Fernbank Museum of Natural History and Georgia Department of Natural Resources began three summer seasons of archeological excavation where the Ocmulgee and Oconee rivers converge to form the Altamaha River. No evidence of the mission was found, and only Muskogean (proto-Creek) architecture and artifacts were uncovered, plus some trade items of probable Spanish origin. In the 17th century the Spanish referred to the Altamaha River as the Rio de Santa Isabel, after the short-lived mission.

== See also ==
- Spanish missions in Georgia
