= Altamaha River =

River in Georgia, the United States of America

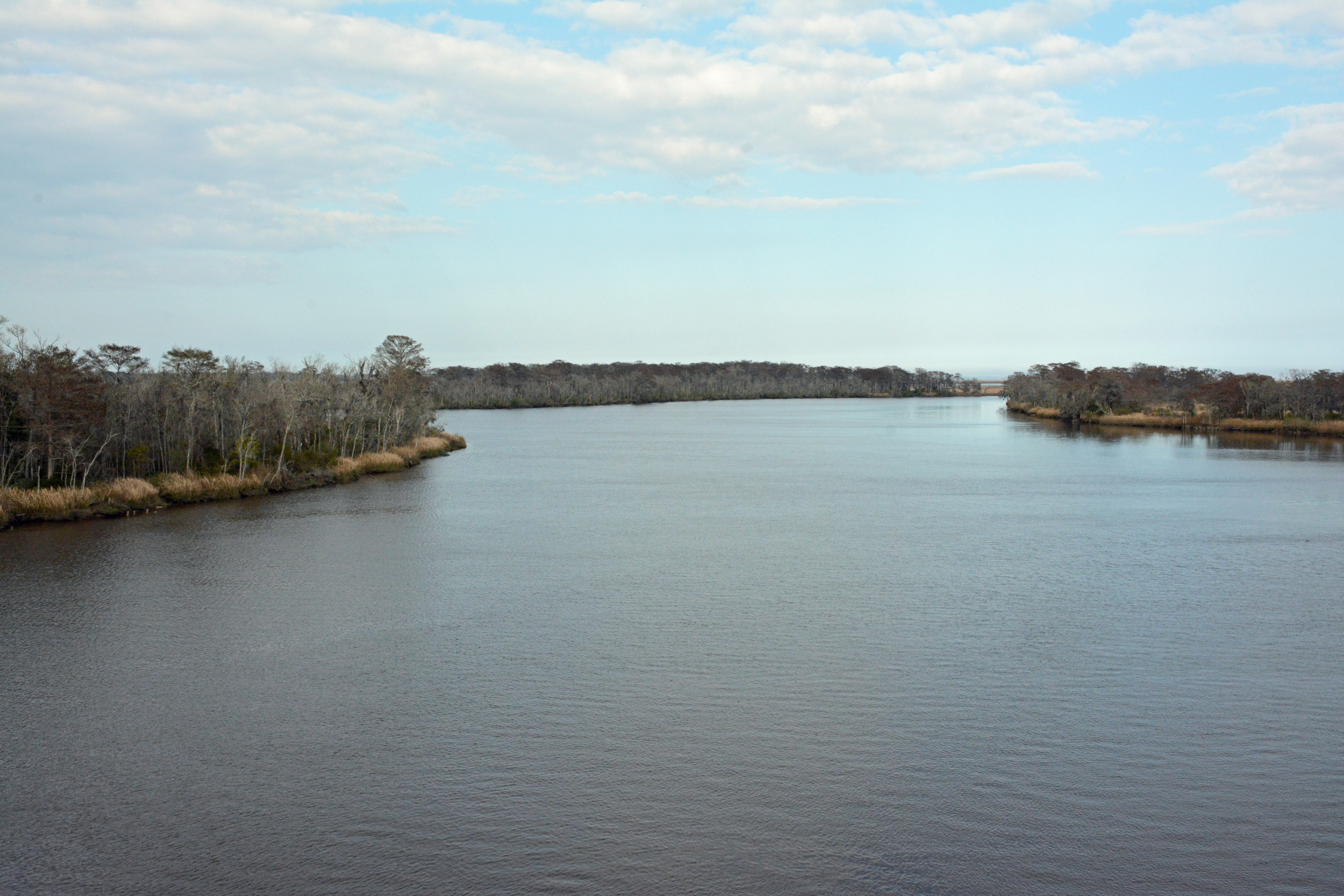
- The Altamaha River viewed from the bridge between Glynn County and McIntosh County, Georgia, USA

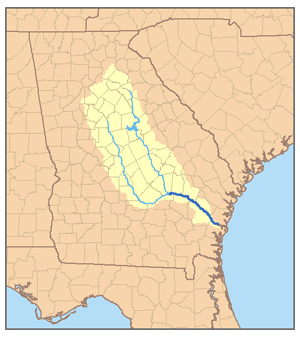
- Map of the Altamaha River watershed showing the two main tributaries, the Ocmulgee River and the Oconee River

Location
- Country: United States
- State: Georgia

Physical characteristics
- Source: near Hazlehurst
  - location: Georgia
  - coordinates: 31°57′33″N 82°32′37″W
  - elevation: 82 ft (25 m)
- Mouth: Atlantic Ocean
  - location: Altamaha Sound
  - coordinates: 31°18′57″N 81°17′5″W
  - elevation: 0 ft (0 m)
- Length: 137 mi (220 km)
- Basin size: 14,000 sq mi (36,000 km^{2})
- Discharge
  - location: Doctortown, GA
  - average: 13,520 cu ft/s (383 m^{3}/s)
  - minimum: 1,410 cu ft/s (40 m^{3}/s)
  - maximum: 178,000 cu ft/s (5,000 m^{3}/s)

Basin features
- Tributaries
  - left: Ohoopee River; Beards Creek; Mushmelon Creek
  - right: Penholoway Creek

The Altamaha River /ˈɑːltəməhɑː/ is a major river in the U.S. state of Georgia. It flows generally eastward for 137 miles (220 km) from its origin at the confluence of the Oconee River and Ocmulgee River towards the Atlantic Ocean, where it empties into the ocean near Brunswick, Georgia. No dams are directly on the Altamaha, though some are on the Oconee and the Ocmulgee. Including its tributaries, the Altamaha River's drainage basin is about 14,000 square miles (36,000 km^{2}) in size, qualifying it among the larger river basins of the US Atlantic coast.

== Course ==
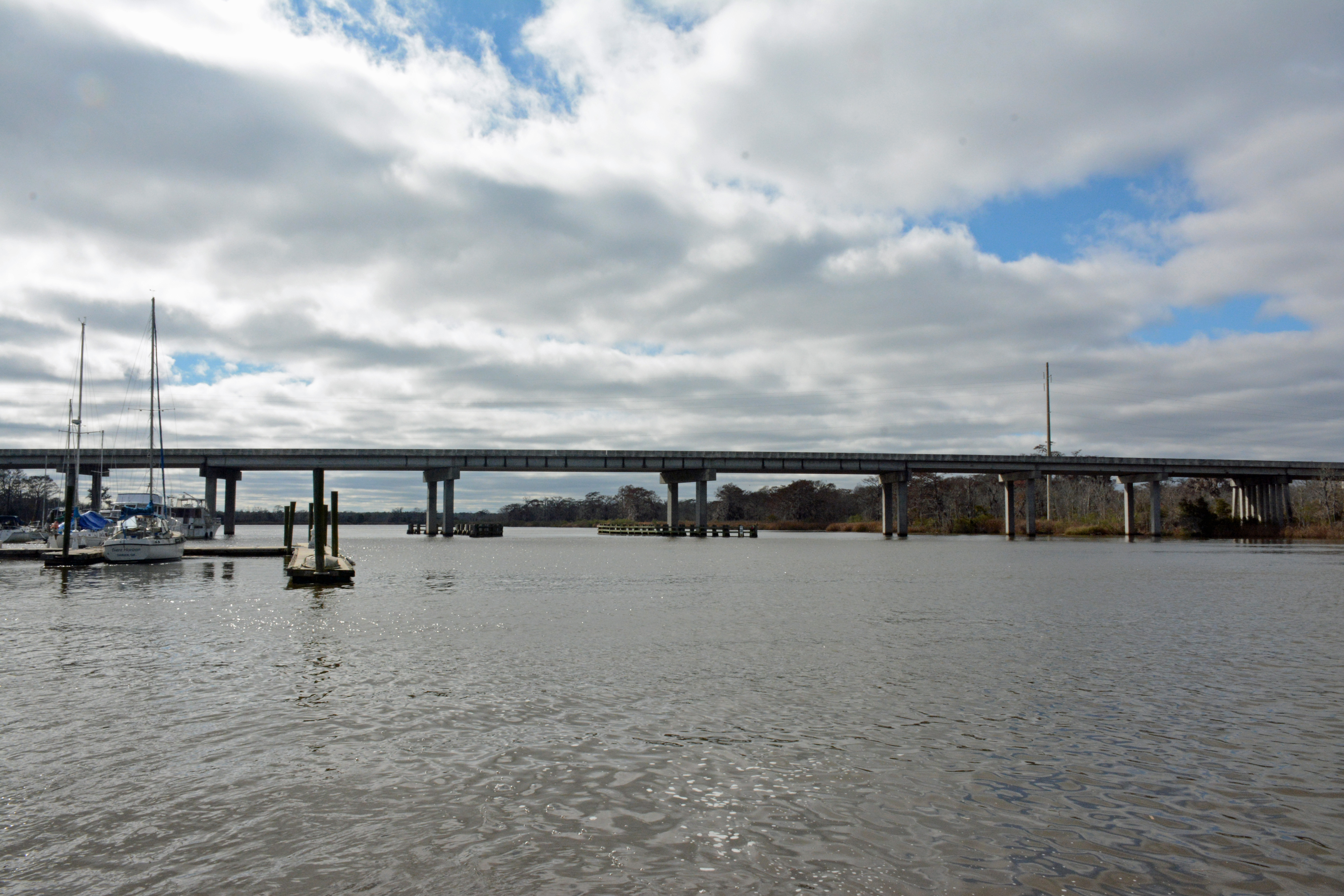
US Highway 17 crossing the Altamaha River on the border of McIntosh and Glynn Counties, Georgia

The Altamaha River originates at the confluence of the Oconee and Ocmulgee Rivers, near Lumber City. At its source, the river forms the border between Jeff Davis County to the south and Montgomery County to the north.

It is reportedly the third-largest contributor of fresh water to the Atlantic Ocean from North America. Including its longest tributary (the Ocmulgee) in length calculations, as is standard USGS practice, its length of 470 miles (760 km) places it seventh on the list of U.S. rivers entirely within one state, behind only four Alaskan rivers, the Sacramento-Pit River in California, and the Trinity River in Texas. The beginning of the Colorado River of Texas is just within New Mexico. The long Mobile-Alabama-Coosa River system, mostly in Alabama, originates a short distance within Georgia.

The Altamaha River traverses a broad area of low population density with few significant towns or cities along its course. Some cities are along its upper tributaries, such as the Fall Line cities of Milledgeville on the Oconee and Macon on the Ocmulgee.

Bullard Creek Wildlife Management Area occupies the southern floodplain of the river's first few miles, after which the river marks the boundary between Toombs County to the north and Appling County to the south.

On the north side, Toombs County gives way to Tattnall County, in which the Ohoopee River joins the Altamaha. The Big Hammock Wildlife Management Area and Big Hammock Natural Area are located along the Altamaha at the Ohoopee confluence. Big Hammock Natural Area is a National Natural Landmark site, noted for its ecological biodiversity and many rare plant species, including Georgia plume.

Below Big Hammock, the tributary Beards Creek joins the Altamaha from the north, after which the river marks the border between Long County to the north and Wayne County to the south. The Altamaha passes through Griffin Ridge Wildlife Management Area before flowing by Doctortown, near Jesup. A wide and swampy floodplain surrounds the river in this area.

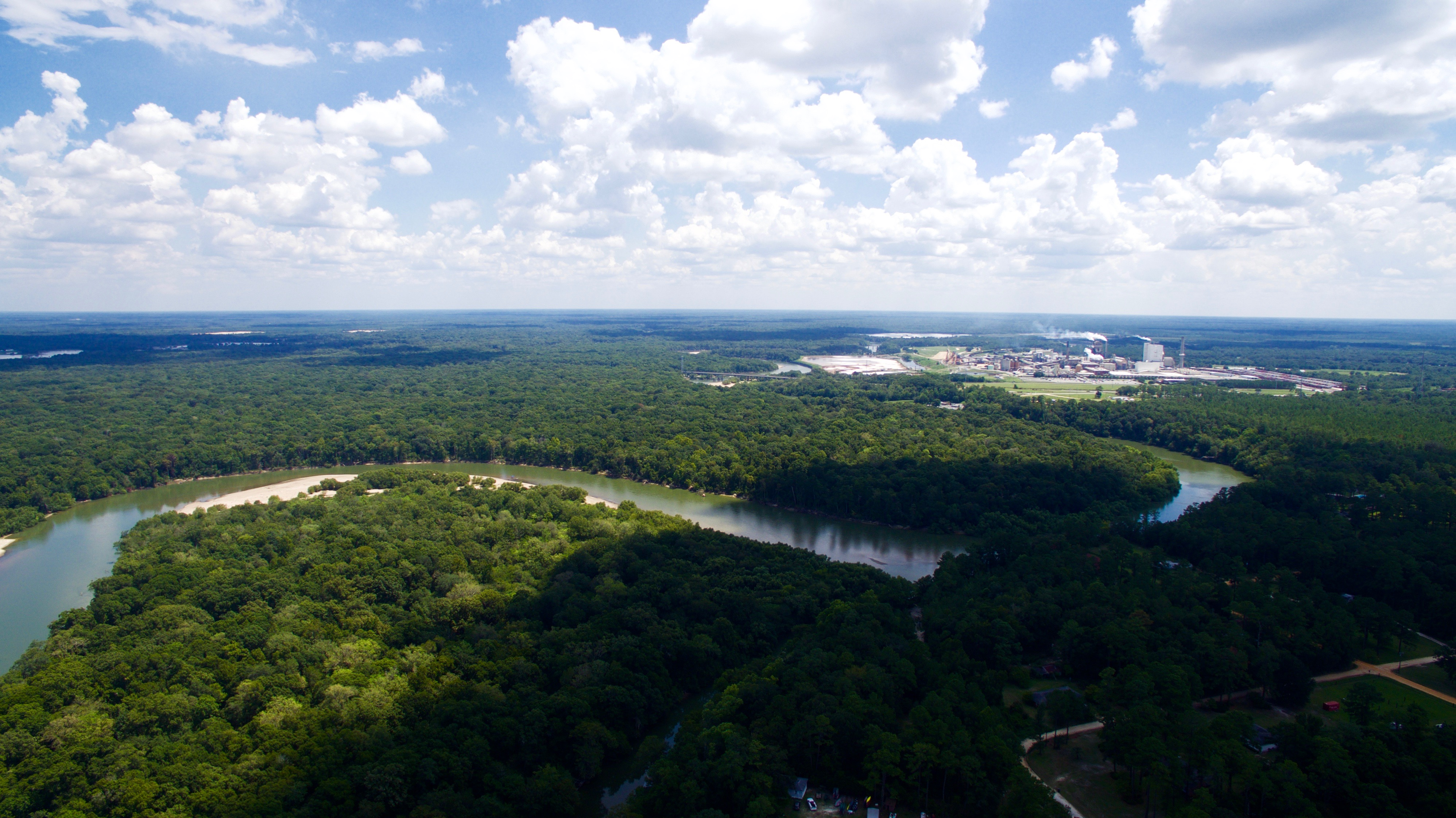
Looking southeast with Rayonier and US-301 bridge in background

Several miles below Doctortown, Wayne County gives way to McIntosh County on the north side of the river. From this point to the river's mouth, numerous wildlife management areas line the river. The Sansaville Wildlife Management Area lies on the south side of the river, while the Altamaha Wildlife Management Area lies on the north and extends down to the river's mouth at Altmaha Sound. Wolf Island National Wildlife Refuge occupies Wolf Island on the Atlantic coast, north of Altamaha Sound. In its last several miles, the Altamaha River marks the boundary between McIntosh County on the north and Glynn County on the south.

The town of Darien lies just north of the Altamaha River's mouth. Several miles to the south lies the larger city of Brunswick. St. Simons Island lies on the south side of the Altamaha estuary. The estuary of the Altamaha River, where fresh and salt water mix, is about 26 square miles (67 km^{2}) in size, one of the largest intact, relatively undegraded estuaries on the Atlantic coast. The Altamaha River Delta has been designated as a site of regional importance to shorebirds by the Western Hemisphere Shorebird Reserve Network.

== Natural history ==
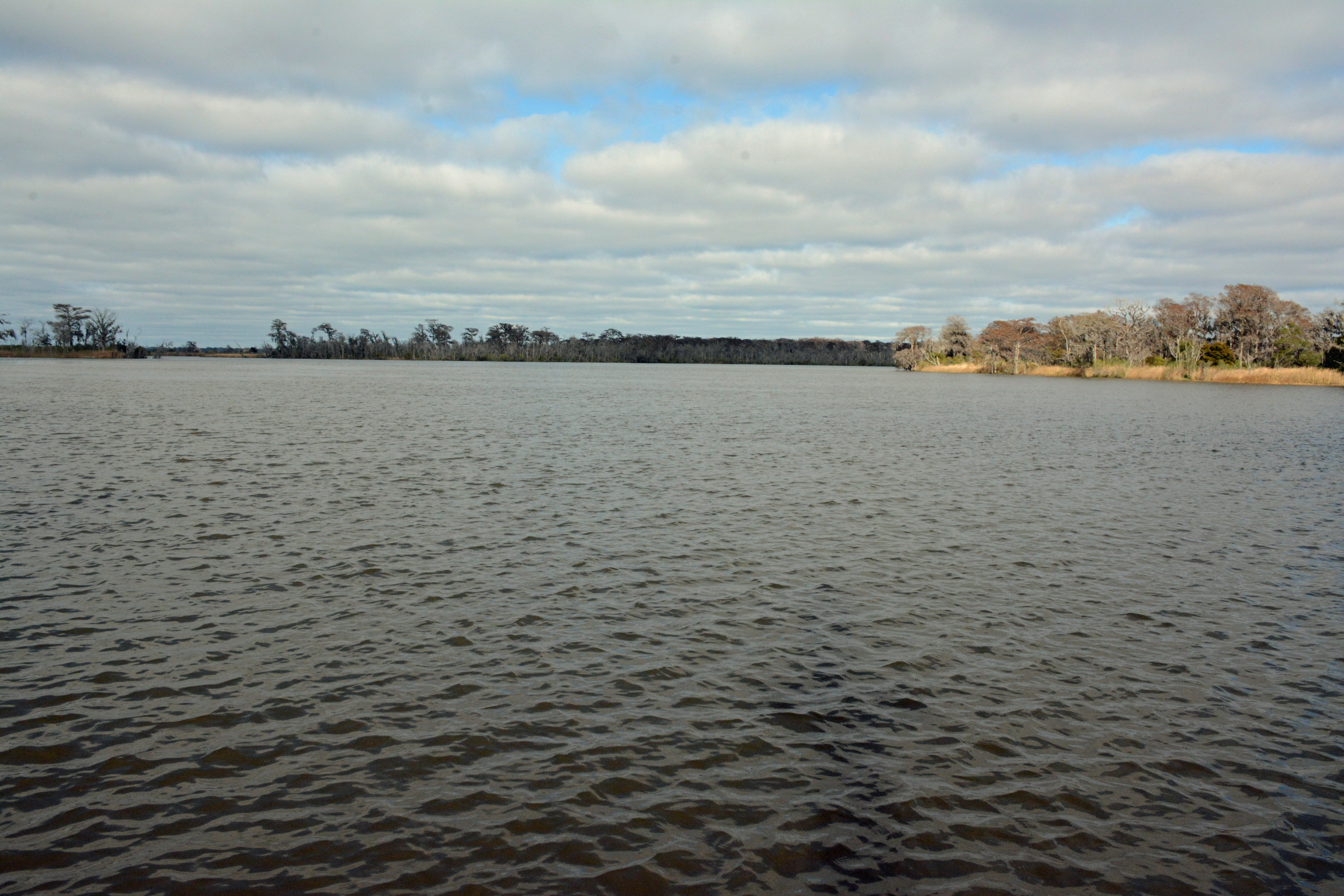
Altamaha River looking towards the Atlantic Ocean

Although used in the 19th century as a route for commerce between central Georgia and the Atlantic coast, the 137-mile river is nearly entirely still in its natural state, was designated a bioreserve in 1991, and one of the 75 “Last Great Places” in the world, by The Nature Conservancy.

The Altamaha River is crossed by roads just five times and flows undammed through a flood plain up to five miles (8.0 km) wide, consisting of river-cut cliffs, cordgrass marshland, and some of the last remaining hardwood bottomlands and old-growth cypress swamps in the American South. As the river approaches the Atlantic Ocean, it becomes a broad estuary. At least 120 species of rare or endangered plants and animals live in the Altamaha River watershed, including 11 species of pearly mussels, seven of which are endemic to the Altamaha.

The river basin also supports the only known example of old-growth longleaf pine and black oak forest in the United States. Other notable species include shortnose sturgeon, Atlantic sturgeon, West Indian manatee, Eastern indigo snake, green-fly orchid, and Georgia plume.

The unusual Franklin tree, now extinct in the wild, was found by John Bartram along the Altamaha River in 1765. Bartram sent seeds from the trees to England and planted some in his garden in Philadelphia, where some still live.

The Georgia River Network offers the Altamaha River Water Trail that extends from Lumber City for the length of the river with 29 access points.

== History ==
According to the USGS, variant and historical names of the Altamaha River include A-lot-amaha, Alatahama, Alatamaha, Allamah, Frederica River, Rio Al Tama, Rio de Talaje, and Talaxe River.

In prehistoric times, the Timucua people occupied northern Florida and a portion of Georgia reaching as far north as the Altamaha River. The Utinahica tribe lived along the river and the Spanish mission of Santa Isabel de Utinahica was established around 1610 near the source of the Altamaha. Along the coast of Spanish Florida, the Altamaha River marked the boundary between the Guale and Mocama missionary provinces.

Fort Caroline, built by the French in 1564 and probably the oldest European fortified settlement in North America, was likely constructed near the mouth of the Altamaha River. Historian Fletcher Crowe noted: “This fort is older than St. Augustine, considered to be the oldest continuously inhabited city in America." It was long believed the legendary fort was located near today's city of Jacksonville, but detailed archival research in France on Fort Caroline and the early history of 'La Floride Française' has proved that wrong, suggesting the Altamaha mouth location as highly likely. The site still remains to be excavated by archaeologists. In 1565, Spanish soldiers under Pedro Menéndez marched into Fort Caroline and slaughtered all the French Huguenot Protestants, regardless of age or gender (some 143 men and women) residing there.

In the later 17th century, a group of Yamasee Indians under Chief Altamaha took up residence near the mouth of the Altamaha. The Altamaha River marked the western border of the Colony of Georgia until the American Revolution, so was the western border of the English settlement in North America. It also marked the boundary between the Spanish missionary provinces of Guale and Mocama. In 1738 James Oglethorpe wrote the Duke of Newcastle that he had taken down Fort King George, a fort on the Altamaha that had offended the Spanish. The river's name comes from a Yamasee chief named Altamaha.

For centuries, riverboats used the Altamaha as the main transportation route to reach those towns and the plantations founded along the river. The Altamaha was also an active transportation corridor for the Georgia timber trade throughout the 19th century, when timber rafts were constructed to deliver logs to the ports of Brunswick and Darien, where they were loaded onto timber schooners and transported to international markets like Liverpool, Rio de Janeiro, and Havana.

Rivermen assigned colorful names to the various features and hazards along their route down the Atamaha. Among the many "riverman monikers" was Old Hell Bight, where the river marks the border between Long County to the north and Wayne County to the south, and is a particularly troublesome bend, with associated dangerous currents, where a pilot and crew might lose "their wages, their timber, and occasionally their lives"

The timber rafts had a maximum width of about forty feet (12 m), that being the widest that could pass between the pilings of railroad bridges. Maximum length was about 250 feet (76 m), that being the longest that could navigate The Narrows, several miles of the river that were not only very narrow but also very crooked. Each raft had two oars forty to fifty feet long, one in the bow, the other at the stern. The oars were for steering, not propelling, the raft. The minimum raft crew was two men, the pilot who usually manned the stern oar, and his bow hand. Rafts usually had a lean-to shack for shelter and a mound of dirt for a hearth to warm by and cook on.

In Oliver Goldsmith's 1770 poem "The Deserted Village", he laments the depopulation of English villages, and he paints an unhappy picture of the lands to which the former inhabitants have fled, mentioning the Altamaha by name:

Ah, no. To distant climes, a dreary scene,
Where half the convex world intrudes between,
Through torrid tracts with fainting steps they go,
Where wild Altama murmurs to their woe.
Far different there from all that charm'd before,
The various terrors of that horrid shore;
Those blazing suns that dart a downward ray,
And fiercely shed intolerable day;
Those matted woods where birds forget to sing,
But silent bats in drowsy clusters cling;
Those poisonous fields with rank luxuriance crowned,
Where the dark scorpion gathers death around;
Where at each step the stranger fears to wake
The rattling terrors of the vengeful snake;
Where crouching tigers wait their hapless prey,
And savage men, more murderous still than they;
While oft in whirls the mad tornado flies,
Mingling the ravaged landscape with the skies.

== Industry ==
The 1,759-megawatt Plant Hatch nuclear power plant sits on the southern bank of the Altamaha River in Appling County.

A Rayonier paper mill that manufactures cellulose fibers used in plastics and absorbent materials for diapers, tampons, and other products is located on the southern bank of the Altamaha River in Wayne County.

== Preservation and restoration ==
In January 2021, Ingka Investments, part of the parent company of IKEA, acquired 10,840 acres (4,390 hectares) near the Altamaha River Basin from The Conservation Fund. The legal agreement is to protect the land from fragmentation, restore the longleaf pine forest, and safeguard the habitat of the gopher tortoise.”

== See also ==
- List of rivers in Georgia (U.S. state)
- List of rivers of the Americas by coastline
- Altamaha-ha
- South Atlantic-Gulf Water Resource Region
- Midnight Rider train incident
