= Alachua culture =

Archaeological culture in Florida, US

Alachua
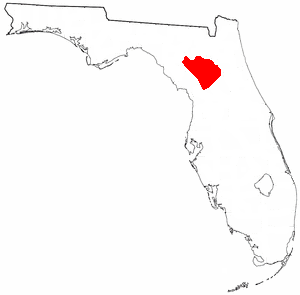
- Period: Late Woodland Southeast
- Dates: 600–1700
- Major sites: Richardson, Bolen Bluff, Fox Pond, Henderson Mound, Law School Mound, Rocky Point and Woodward Mound and Village.
- Preceded by: Cades Pond

The Alachua culture is a Late Woodland Southeast period archaeological culture in north-central Florida, dating from around 600 to 1700. It is found in an area roughly corresponding to present-day Alachua County, the northern half of Marion County and the western part of Putnam County. It was preceded by the Cades Pond culture, which inhabited approximately the same area.

== Origin ==
The archaeologist Jerald Milanich suggests that the people of the Alachua culture were immigrants from what is now Georgia. Early Alachua culture pottery resembled that of the Ocmulgee culture found along the Ocmulgee River. In this scenario, the Ocmulgee immigrants were either already practicing agriculture or adopted it shortly after arriving, and settled in upland areas suitable for agriculture. These areas had been little used by the Cades Pond people, who had occupied areas in wetlands. The Cades Pond culture disappeared soon after the appearance of the Alachua culture. Other archaeologists have suggested that the distinctive Alachua pottery types developed in situ, and even that the resemblance between Ocmulgee and Alachua pottery resulted from a migration from the Alachua area to the Ocmulgee area. Archaeologists also note the close resemblance between Alachua culture and neighboring Suwannee Valley culture pottery, which appears to have developed in situ out of the McKeithen Weeden Island culture.

== Periods ==
The precolumbian part of the Alachua culture period has been divided into the Hickory Pond period (600 to 1250) and the Alachua period (1250-1539). At the time of first contact with Spanish explorers, the Alachua culture area was occupied by the historical Potano Indians, a branch of the Timucua. They spoke the Potano dialect of the Timucua language.

The sub-periods in the Alachua culture period are defined by the relative prevalence of different pottery types. The most common type of pottery during the Hickory Pond period was the Prairie Cord Marked style. The Alachua Cob Marked style became more prevalent in the Alachua sub-period. Other styles of pottery occurred throughout the Alachua culture period.

The period after 1539 was characterized by the introduction of European artifacts and of pottery styles from other cultures. The Potano II period was marked by the almost complete replacement of traditional pottery styles by Leon-Jefferson pottery styles (associated with the Apalachee). This suggests that the depopulated Potano Province was repopulated from Apalachee Province, but no evidence of such a population movement has been found in Spanish documents. Stone and bone tools show little variation over the course of the period.

== Sites ==
The Alachua-culture people occupied hardwood hammocks, with village sites on high ground, near streams or sinkholes. The village sites are often in clusters, which may have resulted from periodic relocation of a village in a small area. The village clusters tend to fall along lines, which may represent the lines of the hammocks, or the paths of trails. Archaeological sites associated with the Alachua culture include the Richardson (8AL100)Site, currently believed to have been the site of the town of Potano visited by Hernando de Soto in 1539, as well as the later mission of San Buenaventura de Potano. Other Alachua culture sites include Bolen Bluff, Fox Pond, Henderson Mound, Law School Mound, Rocky Point and Woodward Mound and Village.

== Subsistence ==
The presence of Cob Marked pottery throughout the period indicates that the people of the Alachua culture grew maize. Middens contain few fresh water shells, and a smaller number of animal species, compared to Cades Pond middens. This may indicate a reduction in hunting and gathering as food sources, compared to the preceding Cades Pond culture. A more detailed analysis of the food resources used by the Alachua culture people has not been made. Burial mounds are found in the area, but have not been extensively excavated. Storage pits and indications of other structures, including a circular house at one site, have been found in villages.

== See also ==
- List of Native American peoples in the United States
