= Jacques Le Moyne =

French artist (c. 1533–1588)

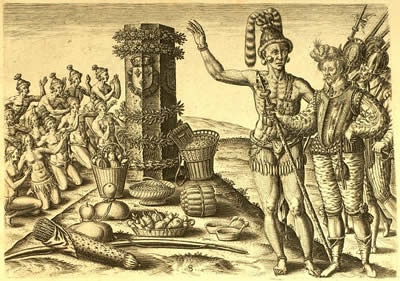
One of Theodor de Bry's engravings possibly based on Le Moyne's drawings, depicting Athore, son of the Timucuan king Saturiwa, showing Laudonnière the monument placed by Ribault.

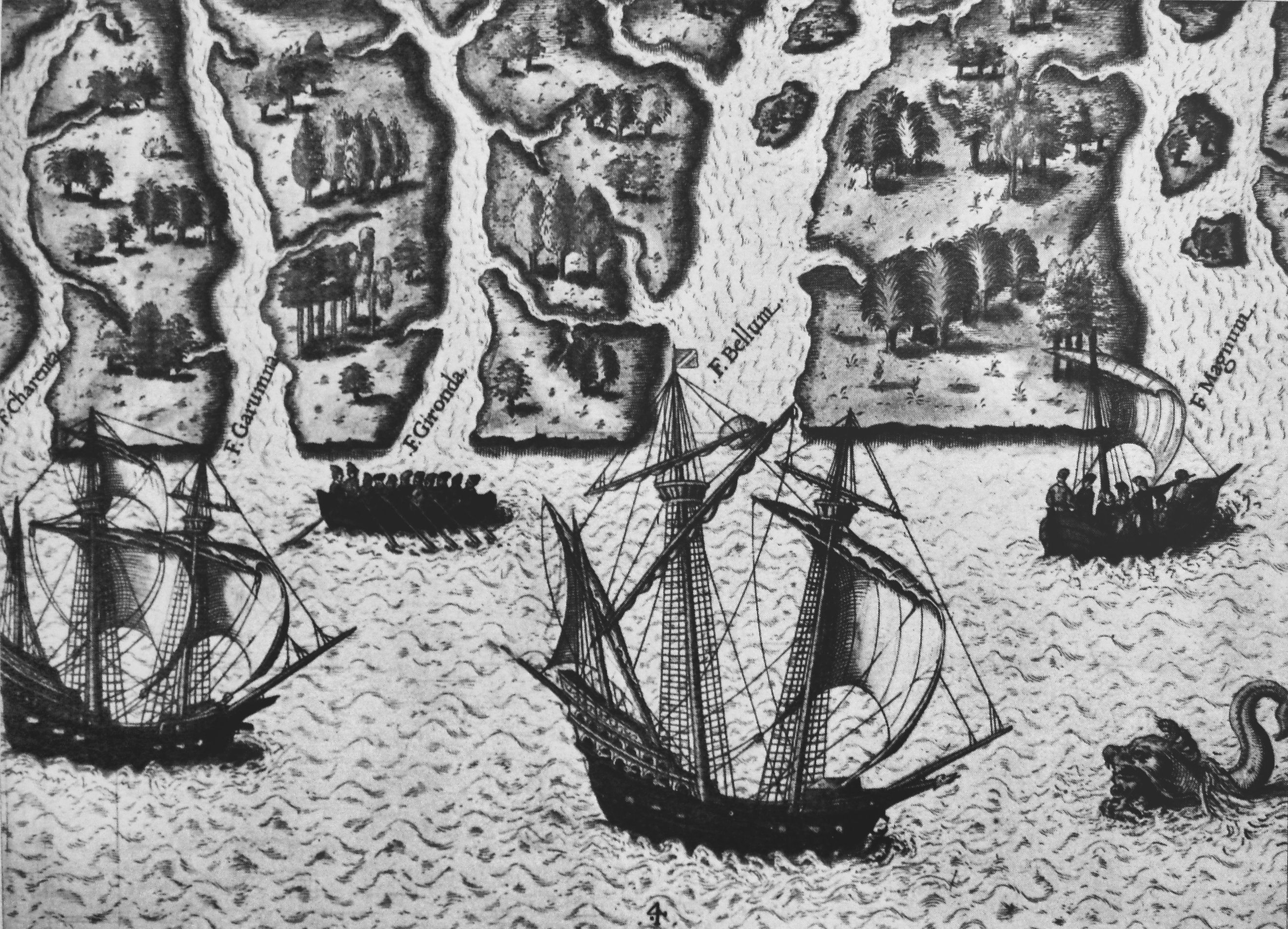
Exploration of Florida by Ribault and Laudonniere, 1564, by Le Moyne de Morgues.

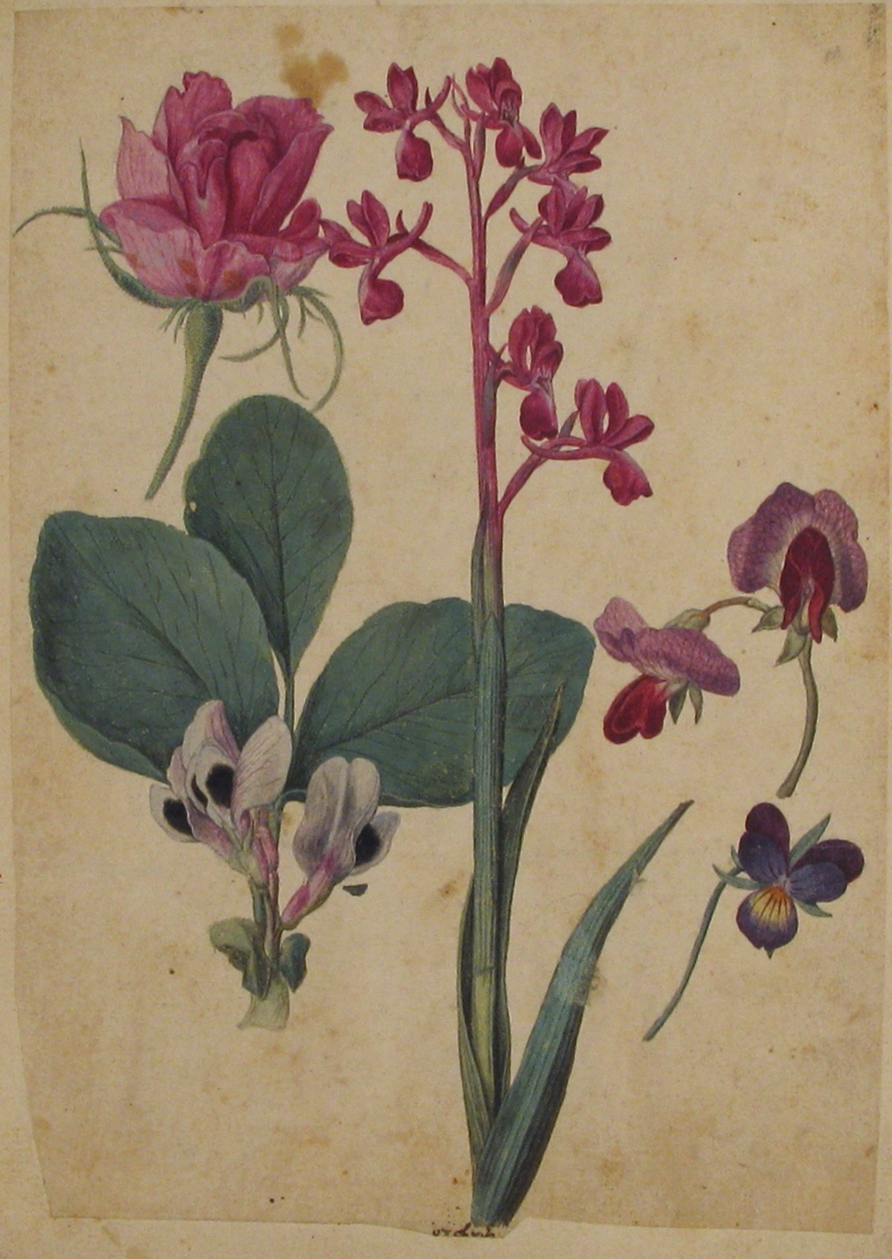
A Rose, a Heartsease, a Sweet Pea, a Garden Pea, and a Lax-flowered Orchid Metropolitan Museum of Art

Jacques Le Moyne de Morgues (French pronunciation: [ʒak lə mwan də mɔʁɡ]; c. 1533–1588) was a French artist and member of Jean Ribault's expedition to the New World. His depictions of Native American life and culture, colonial life, and plants are of extraordinary historical importance.

Until well into the 20th century, knowledge of Jacques Le Moyne de Morgues was extremely limited, and largely confined to the footnotes of inaccessible ethnographic bibliographies, where he figures as the writer and illustrator of a short history of Laudonniere's attempt in 1564–5 to establish a Huguenot settlement in Florida. In 1922, however, Spencer Savage, librarian of the Linnean Society, made a discovery that opened the way to the subsequent definition of Le Moyne as an artistic personality; he recognized that a group of fifty-nine watercolors of plants contained in a small volume, purchased by the Victoria and Albert Museum in 1856 solely for its fine sixteenth-century French binding, were in fact by Le Moyne. Savage's publications relating to this discovery prepared the way for subsequent attribution to the artist of other important groups of drawings and watercolors, which form the core of his known oeuvre.

== Early life ==
Le Moyne was born about 1533, in Dieppe, France. The first thirty years of his life are undocumented, but it seems reasonable to suppose that he trained as an artist in his native town, which was at the time a center for cartography and illumination. Le Moyne probably worked at the court of King Charles IX of France, although there is no documentary record to that effect, nor are there any surviving works by the artist dating from before his departure for Florida in 1564.

== Expedition to Florida ==
Le Moyne accompanied the French expedition of René Laudonnière in an ill-fated attempt to colonize northern Florida. They arrived at the St. Johns River in 1564, and soon founded Fort Caroline near present-day Jacksonville. Painting in the Calvinist style, he is mostly known for his artistic depictions of the landscape, flora, fauna, and, most importantly, the inhabitants of the New World. His drawings of the cultures commonly referred to as the Timucua (known through their reproduction by the Belgian publisher Theodor de Bry) are largely regarded as some of the most accessible data about the cultures of the Southeastern Coastal United States; however, many of these depictions and maps are questioned by historians and archaeologists as to their authenticity. During this expedition he became known as a cartographer and an illustrator as he painted landscapes and reliefs of the land they crossed.

Jean Ribault first explored the mouth of the St. Johns River in Florida in 1562 and erected a stone monument there before leading the party north and establishing an outpost of two dozen or so soldiers on Parris Island, South Carolina. He then sailed back to France for supplies and settlers. However, he was not able to reinforce the fort because while he had been gone, civil war had broken out in France. A truce in 1564 allowed Laudonniere to lead a new expedition, which founded Fort Caroline on the St. Johns Bluff in what is now Jacksonville. Many of the DeBry engravings depict the French fort and the local Saturiwa tribe, the Timucua group who lived at the mouth of the St. Johns in the area of Fort Caroline. Le Moyne also accompanied several inland expeditions from the fort, and he made illustrations of many of the scenes he witnessed.

Laudonniere's expedition, though resulting in the production of the Le Moyne/de Bry publication and an important map of the coastal regions of Florida, was ultimately a disaster; the good relations initially established with the Indian tribes inhabiting the territories around the settlement site at St. Johns soon soured and various members of the French party became disaffected and revolted against their leaders.

The final coup de grâce came a year later, when a Spanish force from the Spanish colony of St. Augustine thirty miles to the south, attacked Laudonniere's stronghold at Fort Caroline. The Spanish, under the leadership of Pedro Menéndez de Avilés, stormed the colony and killed most of the Huguenots, though Laudonnière, Le Moyne and about two dozen others escaped and were eventually rescued to England. Having lost their way on the return, they sailed half starved into Swansea Bay, Wales in mid-November 1565, and finally reached Paris early in 1566.

Le Moyne's highly important account of this transatlantic voyage, known today from a Latin edition published in Frankfurt in 1591 by Theodore de Bry under the title 'Brevis narratio eorum quae in Florida Americai provincia Gallis acciderunt', clearly indicates that it was the King who instructed the artist to accompany the expedition, headed by Jean Ribault and Rene Goulaine de Laudonniere, as official recording artist and cartographer. Although only one original drawing by Le Moyne of an American subject is known today—the depiction of 'Athore showing Laudonniere the Marker Column set up by Ribault,' executed in watercolor and gouache on vellum, now in the New York Public Library—the 'Brevis narratio,' published by de Bry as the second volume of his great series of publications on voyages to the New World, contains forty-two engraved illustrations and maps alleged to have been made on the spot by Le Moyne. The text by de Bry describes and analyses these images, and his book constitutes a major landmark in the literature of the early exploration of the Americas.

== Later life ==
Le Moyne fled France after the St. Bartholomew's Day massacre of Huguenots in 1572, ultimately settling in England. Le Moyne ended his career as a highly regarded botanical artist in Elizabethan London, where his patrons included Sir Walter Raleigh and Lady Mary Sidney. He died in London in 1588.

== Drawings and authenticity ==
All but one of Le Moyne's original drawings were reportedly destroyed in the Spanish attack on Fort Caroline; most of the images attributed to him are actually engravings created by the Belgian printer and publisher Theodor de Bry based on recreations Le Moyne produced from memory. These reproductions, distributed by Le Moyne in printed volumes, are some of the earliest images of European colonization in the New World to be circulated. Le Moyne died in London in 1588, and his detailed account of the voyage, Brevis narratio eorum quae in Florida Americai provincia Gallis acciderunt, was published in 1591. A re-edition of his paintings including critical response was published in 1977 by the British Museum.

The images of the Timucua and related maps, said to be based on Le Moyne's drawings by de Bry, have fallen under intense scrutiny and their legitimacy as works related to Le Moyne are considered very questionable. Jerald Milanich, author of books on the Timucua and an archaeologist at the Florida Museum of Natural History has published an article in which he questions whether Le Moyne produced drawings of the Timucua at all, based on the inexplicable lack of any definite documentation or evidence. The one existing painting believed to be by Le Moyne himself (owned by the New York Public Library) has been argued to be a replica of one of de Bry's etchings, rather than a source for it, by anthropologist and ethnohistorian Christian Feest.

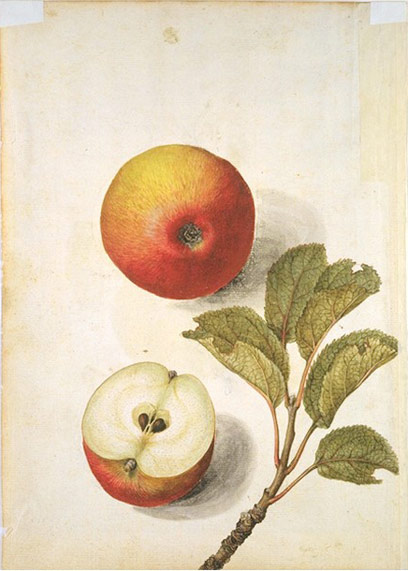
Jacques Le Moyne de Morgues (about 1533–1588, Apple (Malus pumila Millervar), 1568–1572, Watercolour and body colour on paper V&A Museum no. AM.3267Y-1856 Victoria and Albert Museum, London

== Botanical paintings ==
The six documented works by the artist in private hands are exquisite gouaches which embody and combine in a most original manner three diverse artistic traditions: the first is that of manuscript illumination in Le Moyne's native France; the second is the recording of exotic and native flora, fauna and cultures, which was the artistic expression of the late sixteenth-century fascination with exploration and scientific investigation; and the third is the purely aesthetic love of flowers and gardens which was so apparent in Elizabethan court culture. Le Moyne's work represents a transition from the medieval focus on the religious symbolism of plants in art to a Renaissance emphasis on scientific inquiry and beauty when creating botanical illustration.

The most extravagant and exquisitely wrought of all Le Moyne's floral works are the six miniature-like gouaches from the Korner collection. Purchased as the work of an anonymous Netherlandish artist of circa 1600, their authorship was recognized by art historians Dr. Rosy Schilling and Mr. Paul Hutton, by comparison with the drawings by Le Moyne in the British Museum. These are generally similar in conception to the watercolors in the British Museum, and must also date from around 1585. A number of his works are held in the Victoria and Albert Museum.
