= Francisco Pareja =

Spanish missionary and linguist (c. 1570 – 1628)

Francisco Pareja, OFM (c. 1570 – June 25, 1628) was a Franciscan missionary in Spanish Florida, where he was primarily assigned to Mission San Juan del Puerto. The Spaniard became a spokesman for the Franciscan community to the Spanish and colonial governments, was a leader among the missionaries, and served as custodio for the community in Florida. After the Franciscan organization was promoted to a provincia (province), Pareja was elected by his fellow missionaries as provincial in 1616.

His primary historical importance was as a linguist: he developed the first writing system for the American Indian Timucua language. In 1612 he published the first book in an indigenous language of the United States, a catechism in Spanish and Timucua. From 1612 to 1627, he published eight other works in Spanish and Timucua, for the use of his teaching brothers; six of his works survive. He taught Timucuans to read and write within six months.

The first church in what is now the contiguous United States was founded in St. Augustine, Florida, by Pareja in 1560.

== Early life ==
According to the title page of his Arte y pronunciación en lengua timucuana y castellana, Pareja was born at Auñón in the Diocese of Toledo, Spain; the date of his birth is unknown. He would have studied at a school and seminary there.

== Career ==
Pareja traveled to Florida in 1595 with eleven other Franciscans assigned by the Spanish government to establish missions to the Native Americans. It was the third Spanish effort to establish missions. The brothers were following earlier unsuccessful efforts by Jesuit missionaries, one of whom had been martyred; the others returned to Spain. A group of 13 Franciscans arrived at St. Augustine in 1587. Within five years, most of the Franciscans had become discouraged by their lack of progress and left.

Pareja worked as a missionary on the east coast of the peninsula, notably at San Juan del Puerto, the doctrina (mission) established by Franciscans in 1587 at the main village of the Saturiwa chiefdom of that area. The people had intensive agriculture, hunting and fishing, and developed government.

The Franciscans developed a multi-tier organization, with a doctrina as the base where a resident friar taught Christianity. Other sites, called visitas, were founded in more distant villages, which the resident friar would visit on Sundays and holy days. The total group of friars associated with a doctrina was called a custodia and led by one of them, called a custodio. By 1602 the San Juan del Puerto doctrina had set up nine associated visitas.

Pareja's doctrina was on present-day Fort George Island near the mouth of the St. Johns River in what is now Jacksonville. A cacique or chief ruled the Timucuan village that was associated with San Juan del Puerto; the people spoke the Mocama dialect. In 1603 a Saturiwa whom the Spanish named Maria was cacica; the following year she told the Spanish that her people were pleased with Father Pareja. She may have ruled into the 1620s.

Pareja achieved some success with the Saturiwa; in 1602 he had 500 Christians within his custodio. Nearly that number were confirmed during a visit in 1606 by Bishop Altamirano, including Cacica Maria and five of her subordinate caciques from the area.

=== Developing written Timucuan ===
In his most significant achievement, Pareja developed a form of written language for Timucua. His catechism in Spanish and Timucua, published in 1612, was the first book written in an indigenous language of the United States. Through 1627, he published several other works in both languages. Due to his books and teachings, both Timucuan men and women learned to read and write in less than six months. They were able to write letters to each other in their own language. His works were distributed to other Franciscans and enabled them to teach literacy and Christianity to the Timucua. Since the twentieth century, his work has also been studied for insights into the ethnography of the indigenous people.

Pareja also worked at Mission San Pedro de Mocama on Cumberland Island (present-day Georgia), where he served the Tacatacuru, another Mocama-speaking group. He was there at the time of the Guale revolt in 1597. He later became guardian, or an officer, of the monastery of the Immaculate Conception at St. Augustine. From 1609 to 1612 he served as custodio of the Franciscans in Florida.

When the Franciscan church organization in Florida and Cuba was elevated to the rank of a province (provincia), named Santa Elena de Florida, Pareja was elected as provincial in 1616 by his fellow Franciscans. Seeking more financial support of the Franciscans, he wrote to the colonial government, which seemed to favor soldiers: "we are the ones who bear the burden and heats, and we are the ones subduing and conquering the land." The last contemporary record of him was a fellow Franciscan's reference to his work in Florida in the book published in 1627.

In his last posting, Pareja joined the province of the Holy Gospel in Mexico. He died in Mexico in 1628.

== Works ==
Pareja is noted for having published the first books in the language of an indigenous tribe (the Timucua) within the present-day United States. He published several works between 1612 and 1627 in Timucua and Spanish, although some have been lost. His surviving works are:

- Catecismo En lengua Castellana y Timuquana (Mexico, 1612)
- Catecismo y Breve Exposición de la Doctrina Cristiana" (Mexico, 1612)
- Confessionario En lengua Castellana y Timuquana Con algunos consejos para animar al penitente (Mexico, 1613)
- Gramatica de la lengua Timuquana de Florida (Mexico, 1614)
- Catecismo de la Doctrina Cristiana En lengua Timuquana (Mexico, 1627)
- Catecismo y Examen para los que Comulgan, En lengua Castellana y Timuquana (Mexico, 1627)
- Arte y pronunciación en lengua timuquana y castellana (Mexico, 1627)
- Catechismo en lengua Timuquana y castellana: En que se trata el modo de oyr Missa, y sus ceremonias (Mexico, 1628)

In addition, he was known to have published two other religious works and compiled a dictionary, which did not survive.

== Sources ==
- Amy Turner Bushnell, Situado and Sabana: Spain's Support System for the Presidio and Mission Provinces of Florida, New York: Anthropological Papers of the American Museum of Natural History, 1994
- Michael V. Gannon, Cross in the Sand: The Early Catholic Church in Florida, 1513-1870, Gainesville, Florida: University Presses of Florida, 1965
- Eugene Lyon, The Enterprise of Florida: Pedro Menéndez de Áviles and the Spanish Conquest of 1565-1568, Gainesville, Florida: University Presses of Florida, 1976
