= Aquatic turtles =

Aquatic turtles may refer to:

- Red-eared slider---- Trachemys scripta elegans.
- Pond slider---- Trachemys scripta.
- Northern map turtle---- Graptemys geographica.
- Mud turtle---- Kinosternon.
- Western pond turtle---- Actinemys marmorata.
