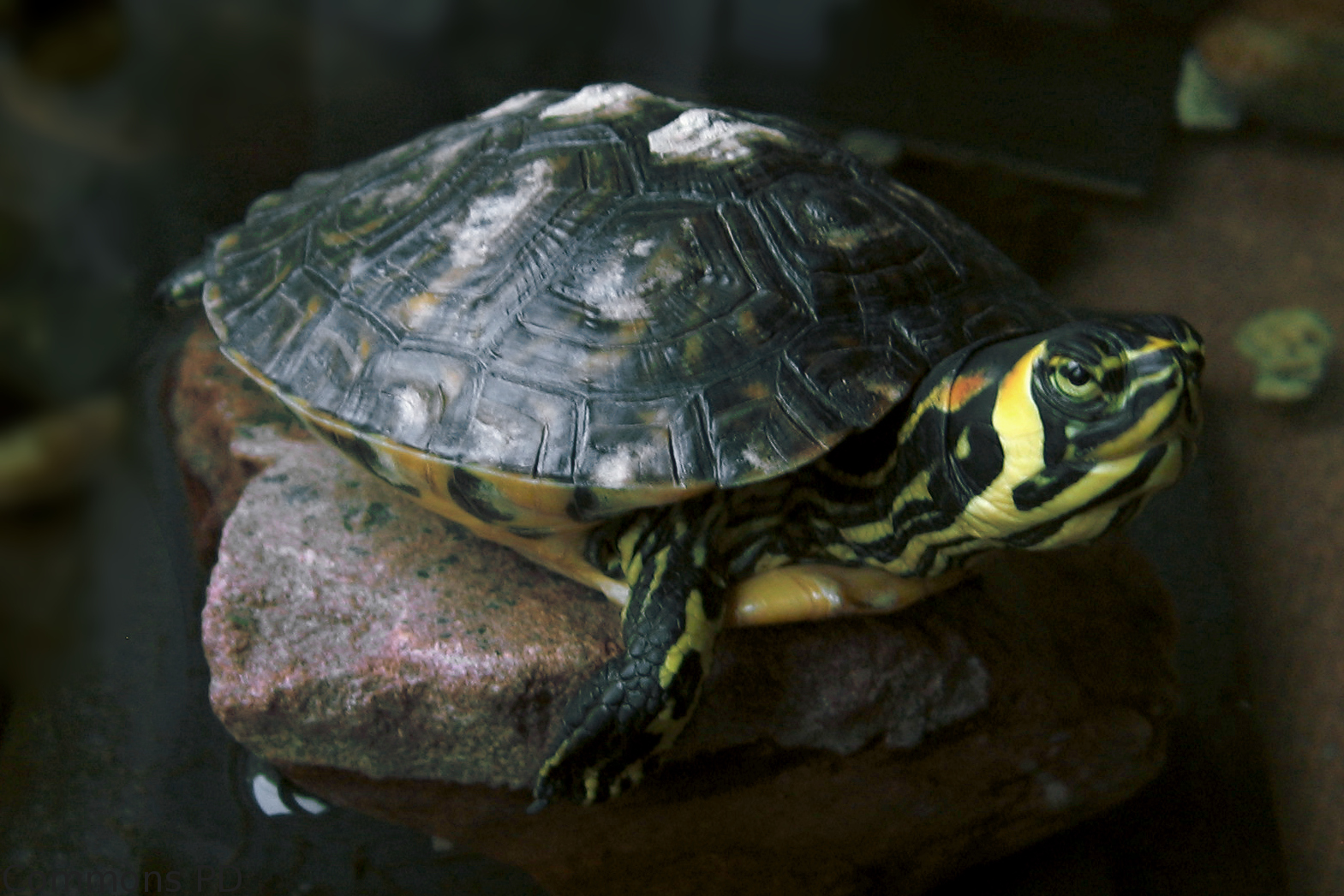

Scientific classification
- Kingdom: Animalia
- Phylum: Chordata
- Class: Reptilia
- Order: Testudines
- Suborder: Cryptodira
- Family: Emydidae
- Subfamily: Deirochelyinae
- Genus: Trachemys
- Species: T. scripta
- Hybrid: T. s. elegans × T. s. scripta

= Red-eared slider × yellow-bellied slider =

Intergradation of two turtle subspecies

The red-eared slider × yellow-bellied slider (Trachemys scripta elegans × Trachemys scripta scripta) is an intergradation of a red-eared slider and yellow-bellied slider subspecies. Intergrade facial markings range from a yellow blotch behind each eye, which may join a yellow neck stripe forming a "C" figure when viewed from the left side to those with an almost indistinguishable amount of red in the eye blotch, to individuals that look similar to red-eared sliders with a red "ear" stripe that does not join with a yellow neck stripe (see attached pictures). In addition, the number of black blotches on the plastron (underside of shell) varies in intergrades from two on the front scutes which is typical of yellow-bellied sliders, to a dark blotch on each scute which is typical of red-eared sliders. Intergrades are presumed to be omnivorous, but hatchlings and juveniles are more carnivorous than adults.

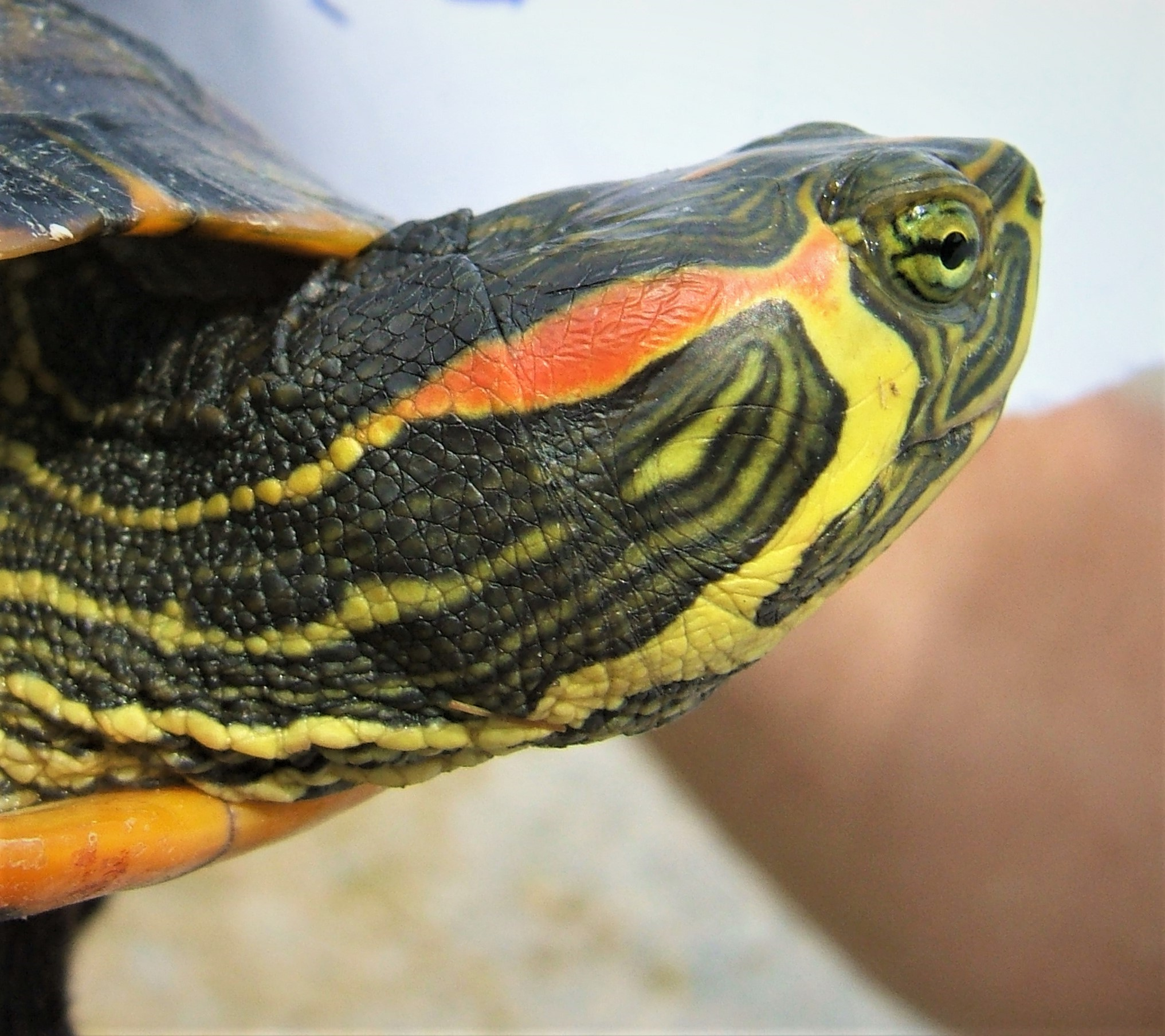
Intergrade of red-eared slider × yellow-bellied slider

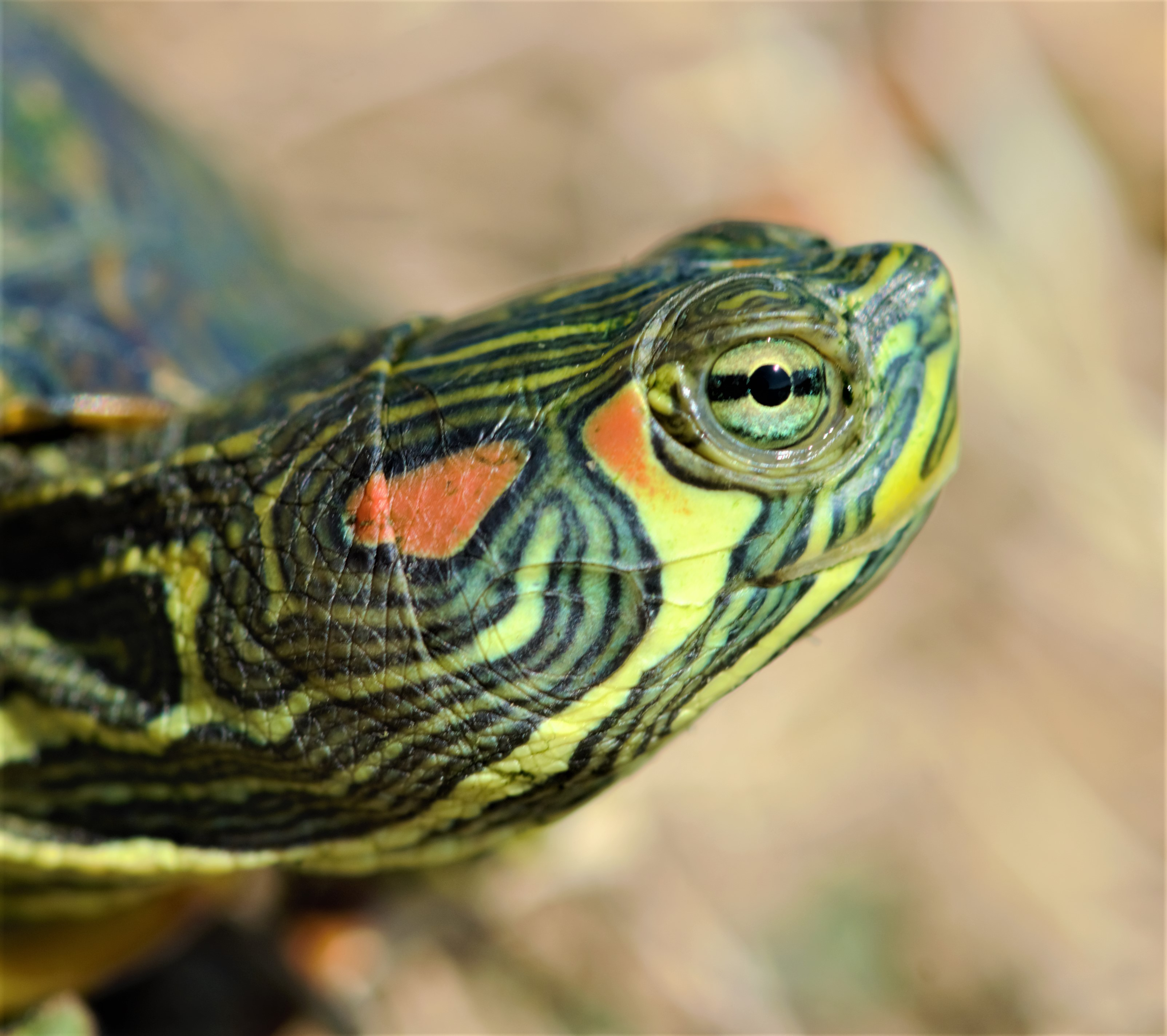
Intergrade of red-eared slider × yellow-bellied slider

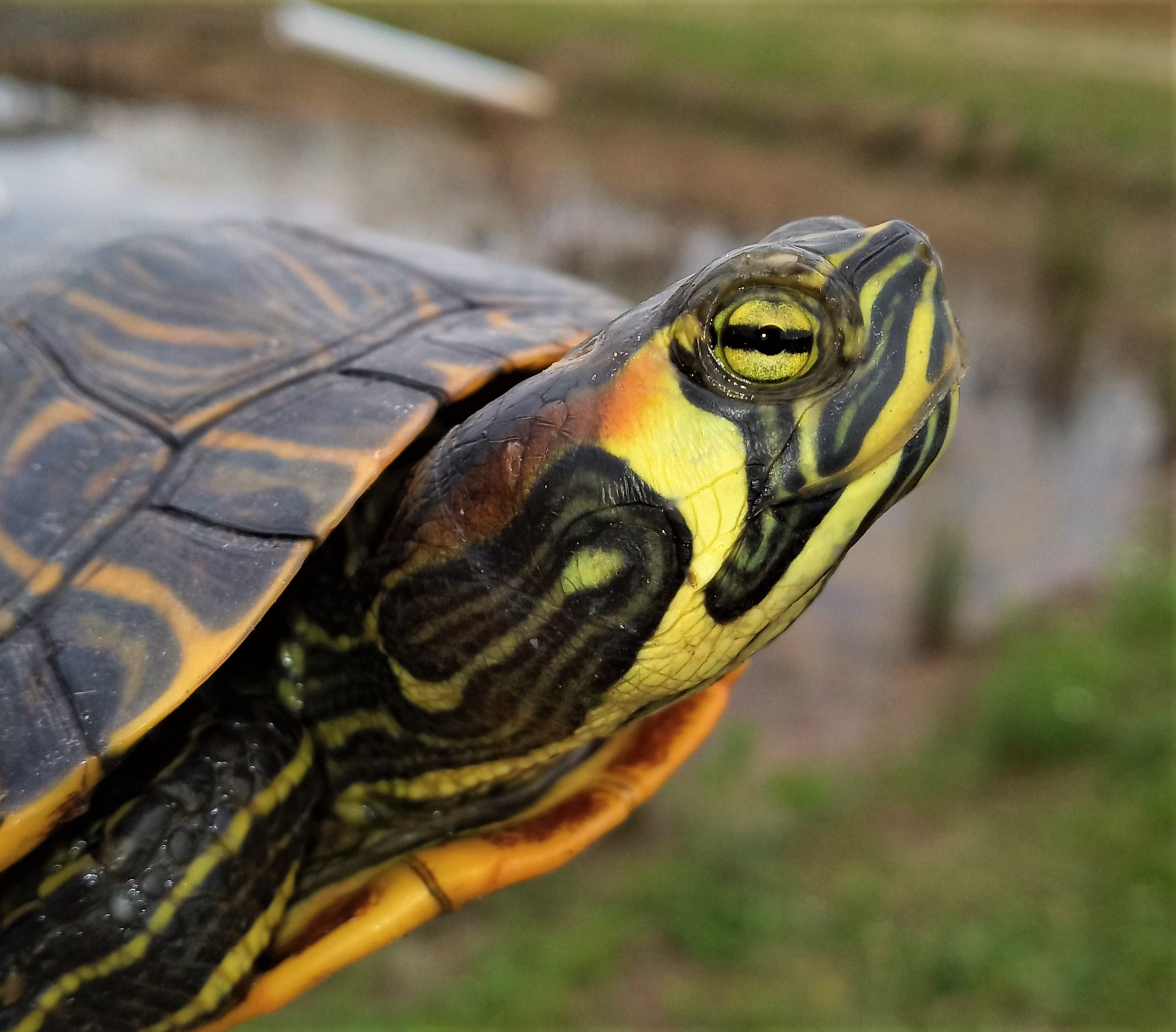
Intergrade of red-eared slider × yellow-bellied slider
