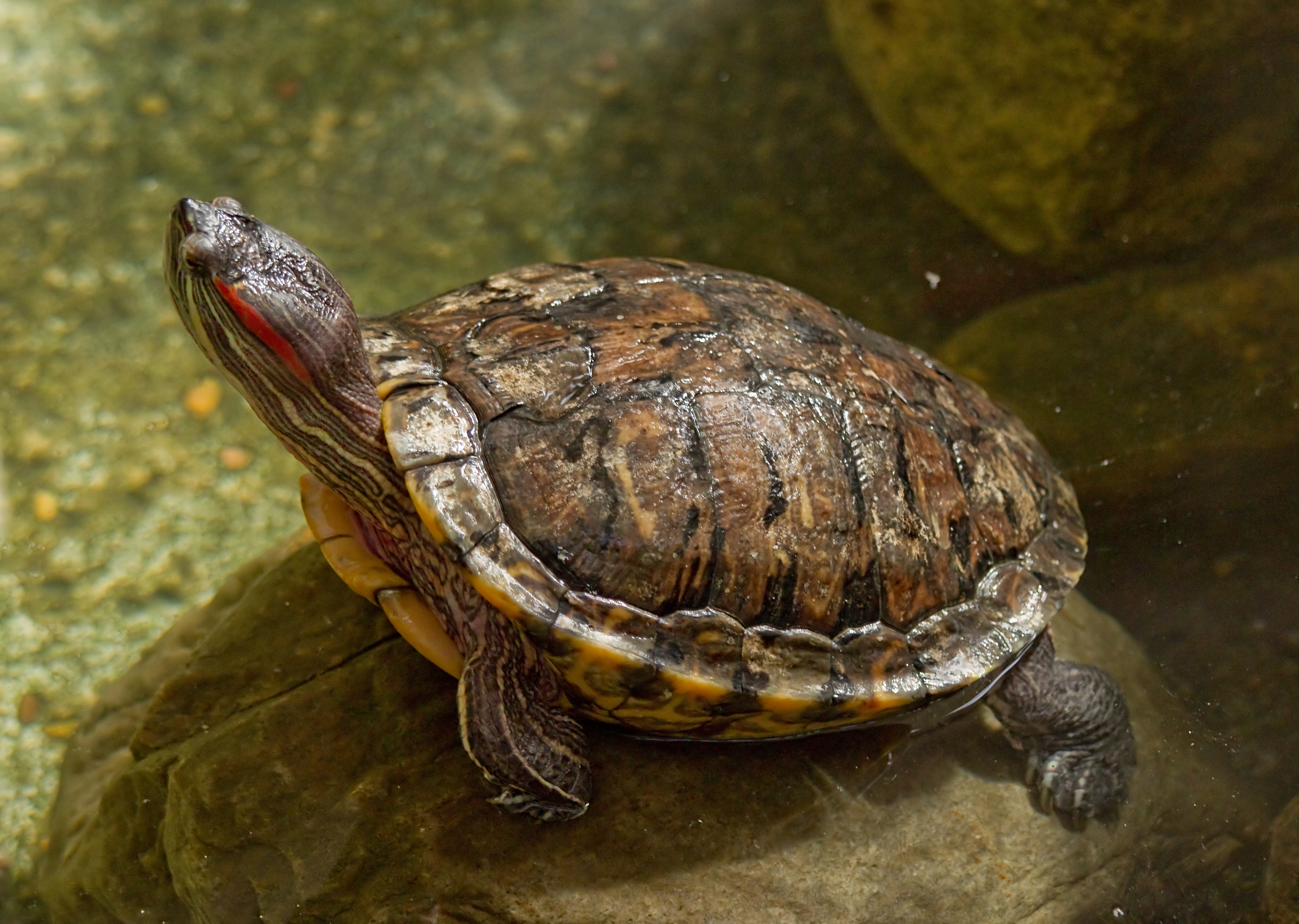
- At the Cincinnati Zoo
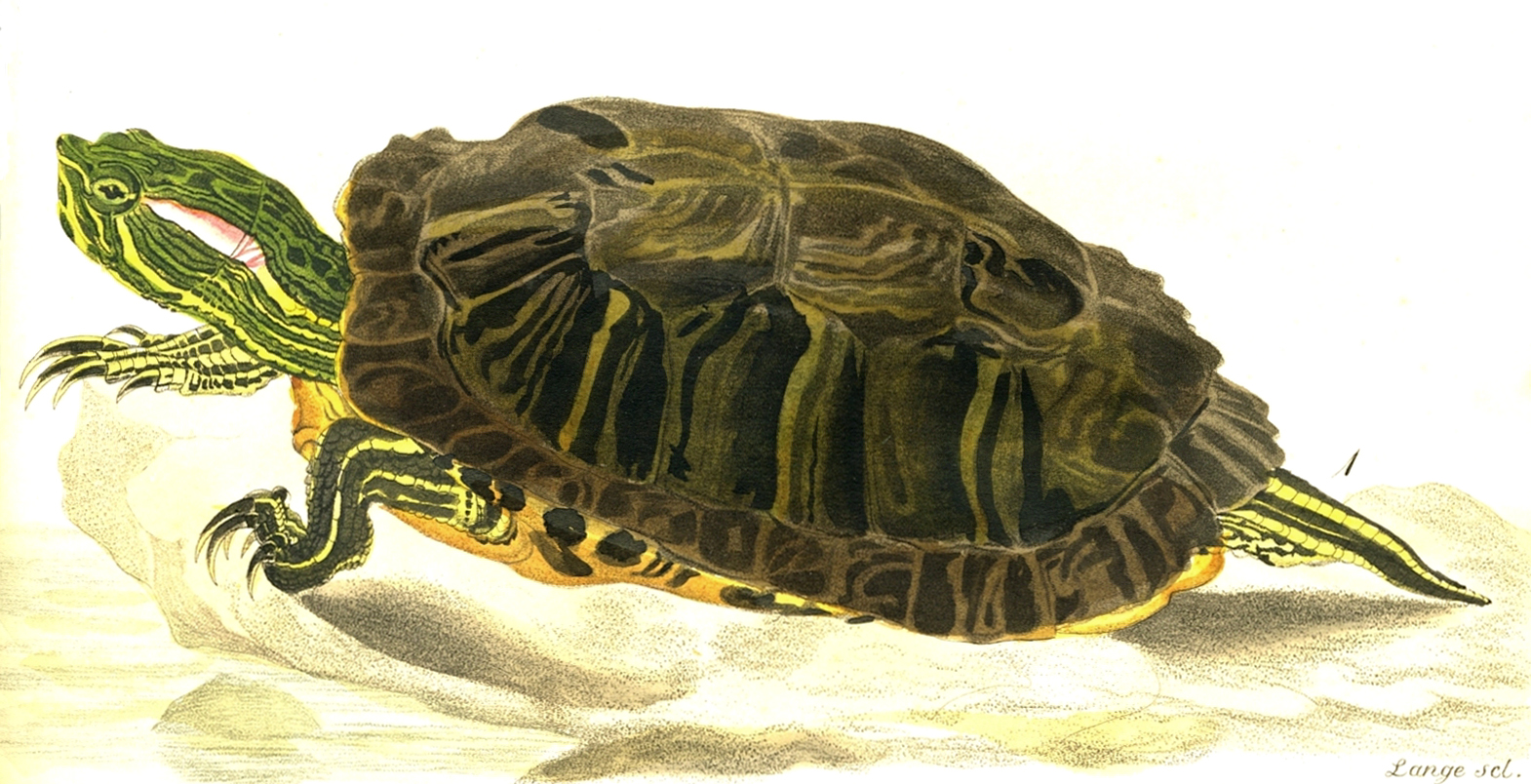
- 1865 engraving by Karl Bodmer, who accompanied the authority on his expedition

Scientific classification
- Kingdom: Animalia
- Phylum: Chordata
- Class: Reptilia
- Order: Testudines
- Suborder: Cryptodira
- Family: Emydidae
- Genus: Trachemys
- Species: T. scripta
- Subspecies: T. s. elegans

Trinomial name
- Trachemys scripta elegans (Wied-Neuwied, 1839)
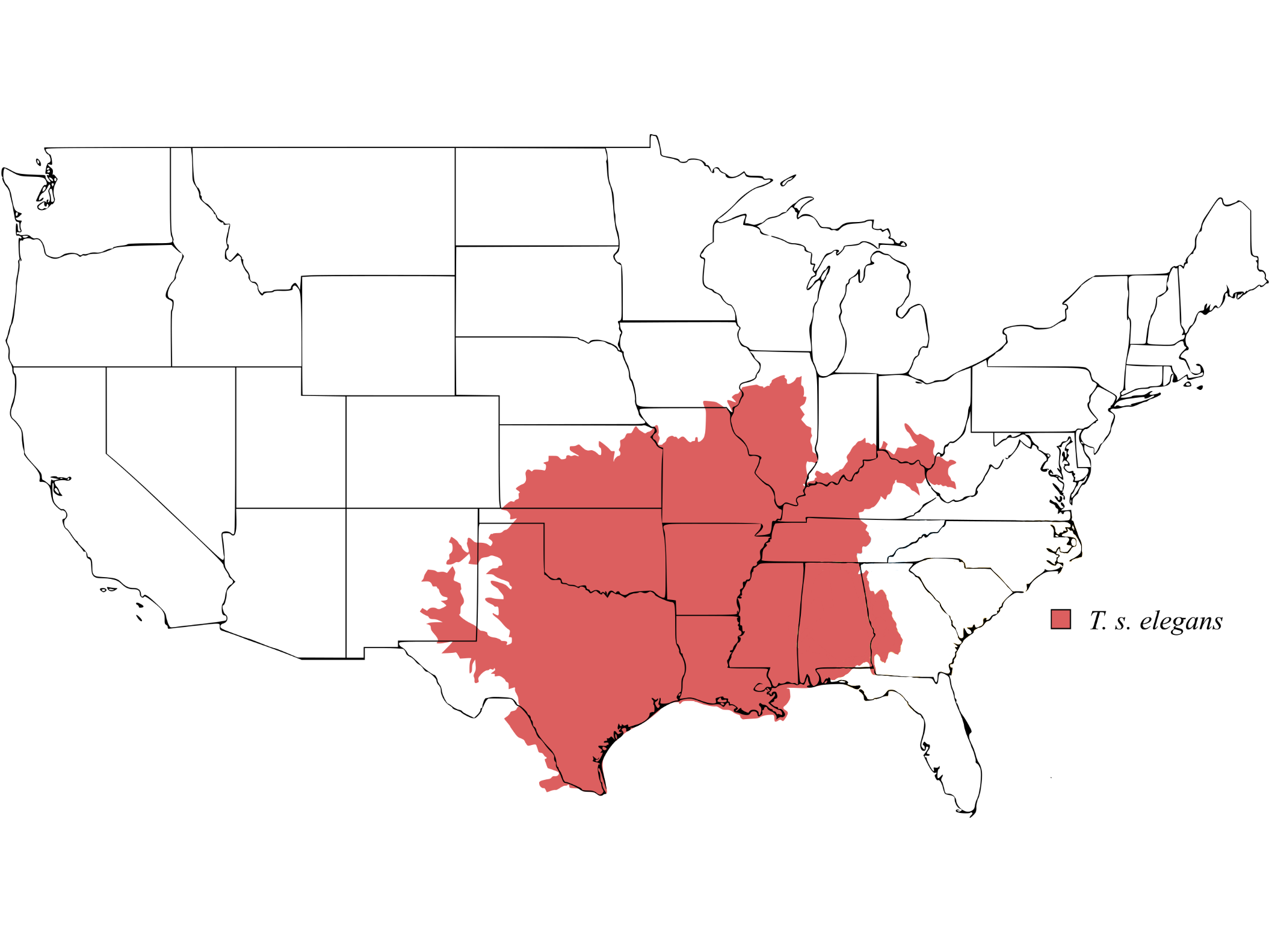
- The US native range T. s. elegans

Synonyms
- Emys elegans Wied-Neuwied, 1839; Emys holbrookii Gray, 1844; Emys sanguinolenta Gray, 1856; Trachemys elegans — Agassiz, 1857; Clemmys elegans — Strauch, 1862; Trachemys holbrooki [sic] — Gray, 1863 (ex errore); Trachemys holbrookii — Gray, 1869; Trachemys lineata Gray, 1873; Pseudemys elegans — Cope, 1875; Chrysemys elegans — Boulenger, 1889; Chrysemys scripta var. elegans — Boulenger, 1889; Chrysemys palustris elegans — Lindholm, 1929; Pseudemys troostii elegans — Stejneger & Barbour, 1939; Pseudemys scripta elegans — Cagle, 1944; Trachemys scripta elegans — Iverson, 1985; Trachemys scripta elagans [sic] Fong, Parham & Fu, 2002 (ex errore); Trachemys scripta elgans [sic] Fong, Parham & Fu, 2002 (ex errore)

= Red-eared slider =

Subspecies of turtle

The red-eared slider or red-eared terrapin (Trachemys scripta elegans) is a subspecies of the pond slider (Trachemys scripta), a terrapin belonging to the family Emydidae. Native to the southern United States and extreme northern Mexico, it is popular as a pet across the world, and is the most invasive chelonian. It is the most commonly traded chelonian in the world.

The red-eared slider is native to the central and southern United States and northern Mexico, but has become established in other places because of pet releases, and has become invasive in many areas where it outcompetes native species. The red-eared slider is included in the list of the world's 100 most invasive species. (Note: Lowe, S.; Browne, M.; Boudjelas, S. (2000). 100 of the world's worst invasive alien species: A selection from the Global Invasive Species Database. IUCN/SSC Invasive Species Specialist Group (ISSG) (Report). Auckland, New Zealand: International Union for Conservation of Nature. See also updated edition: Lowe, Browne, et al. (2004).)

== Etymology ==
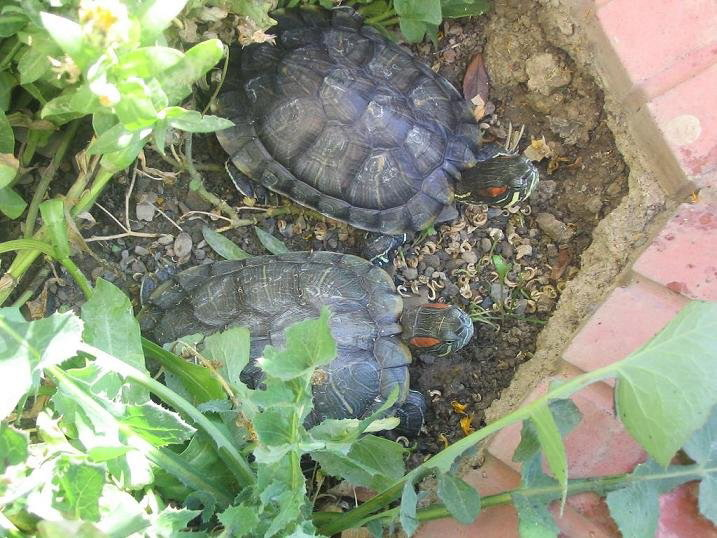
Red-eared sliders are popular pets around the world.

The red-eared slider gets its name from the small, red stripe around its ears, or where its ears would be, and from its ability to slide quickly off rocks and logs into the water. This species was previously known as Troost's turtle in honor of an American herpetologist Gerard Troost. Trachemys scripta troostii is now the scientific name for another subspecies, the Cumberland slider.

== Taxonomy ==
The red-eared slider belongs to the order Testudines, which contains about 250 chelonian species. It is a subspecies of Trachemys scripta. It was previously classified under the name Chrysemys scripta elegans. Trachemys scripta contains three subspecies: T. s. elegans (red-eared slider), T. s. scripta (yellow-bellied slider), and T. s. troostii (Cumberland slider).

== Description ==
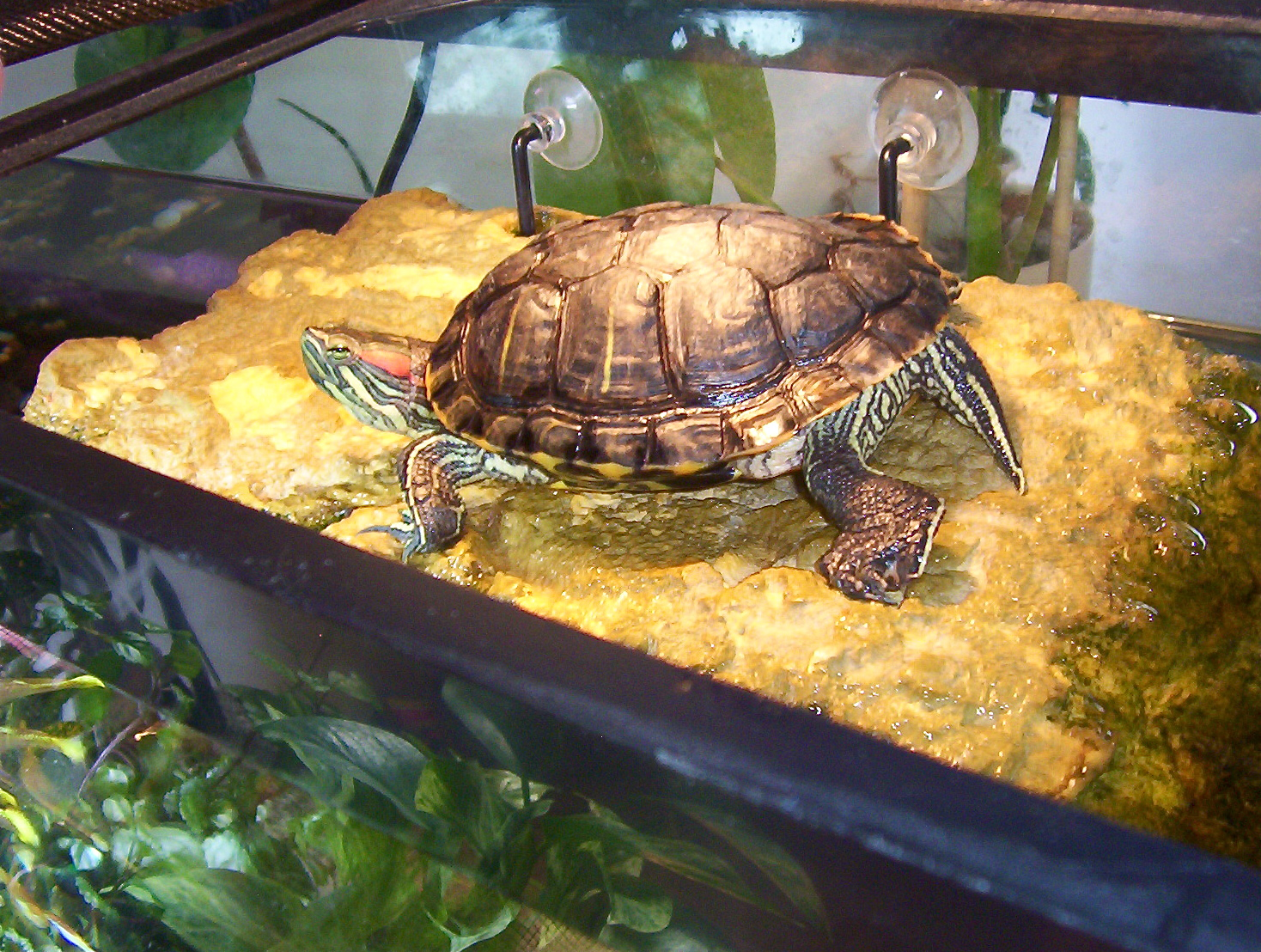
Red-eared slider basking on a floating platform under a sunlamp

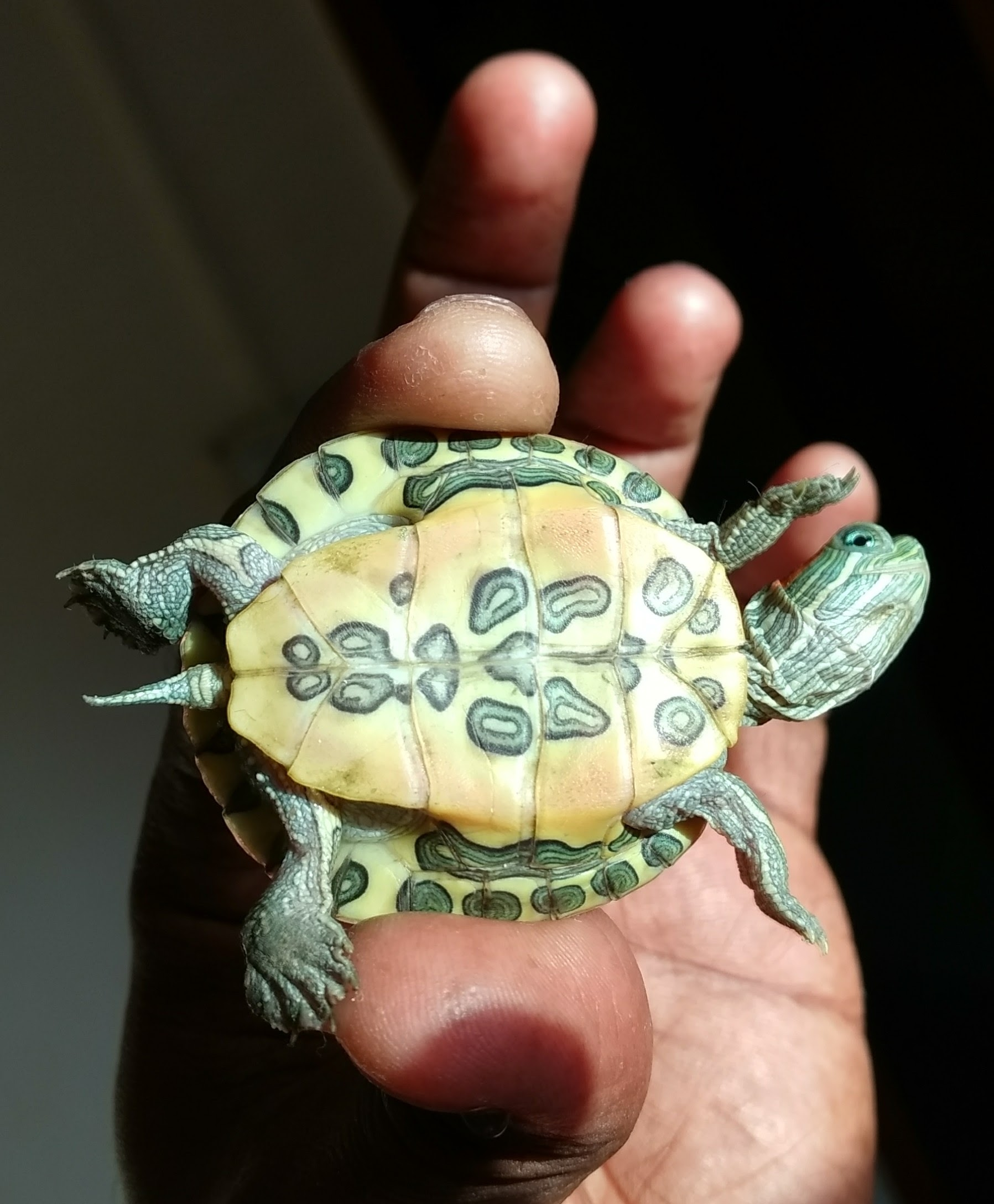
Plastron of a young red-eared slider turtle

The carapace of this species can reach more than 40 cm (16 in) in length, but the typical length ranges from 15 to 20 cm (6 to 8 in). The females of the species are usually larger than the males. They typically live between 20–30 years, although some individuals can live for more than 40 years. Their life expectancy is longer when they are kept in captivity. The quality of their living environment has a strong influence on their lifespans and well being.

The shell is divided into the upper or dorsal carapace, and the lower, ventral carapace or plastron. The upper carapace consists of the vertebral scutes, which form the central, elevated portion; pleural scutes that are located around the vertebral scutes; and then the marginal scutes around the edge of the carapace. The rear marginal scutes are notched. The scutes are bony keratinous elements. The carapace is oval and flattened (especially in the male) and has a weak keel that is more pronounced in the young. The color of the carapace changes depending on the age of the terrapin. It usually has a dark green background with light and dark, highly variable markings. In young or recently hatched terrapins, it is leaf green and gets slightly darker as a terrapin gets older, until it is a very dark green, and then turns a shade between brown and olive green. The plastron is always a light yellow with dark, paired, irregular markings in the centre of most scutes. The plastron is highly variable in pattern. The head, legs, and tail are green with fine, irregular, yellow lines. The whole shell is covered in these stripes and markings that aid in camouflaging an individual.

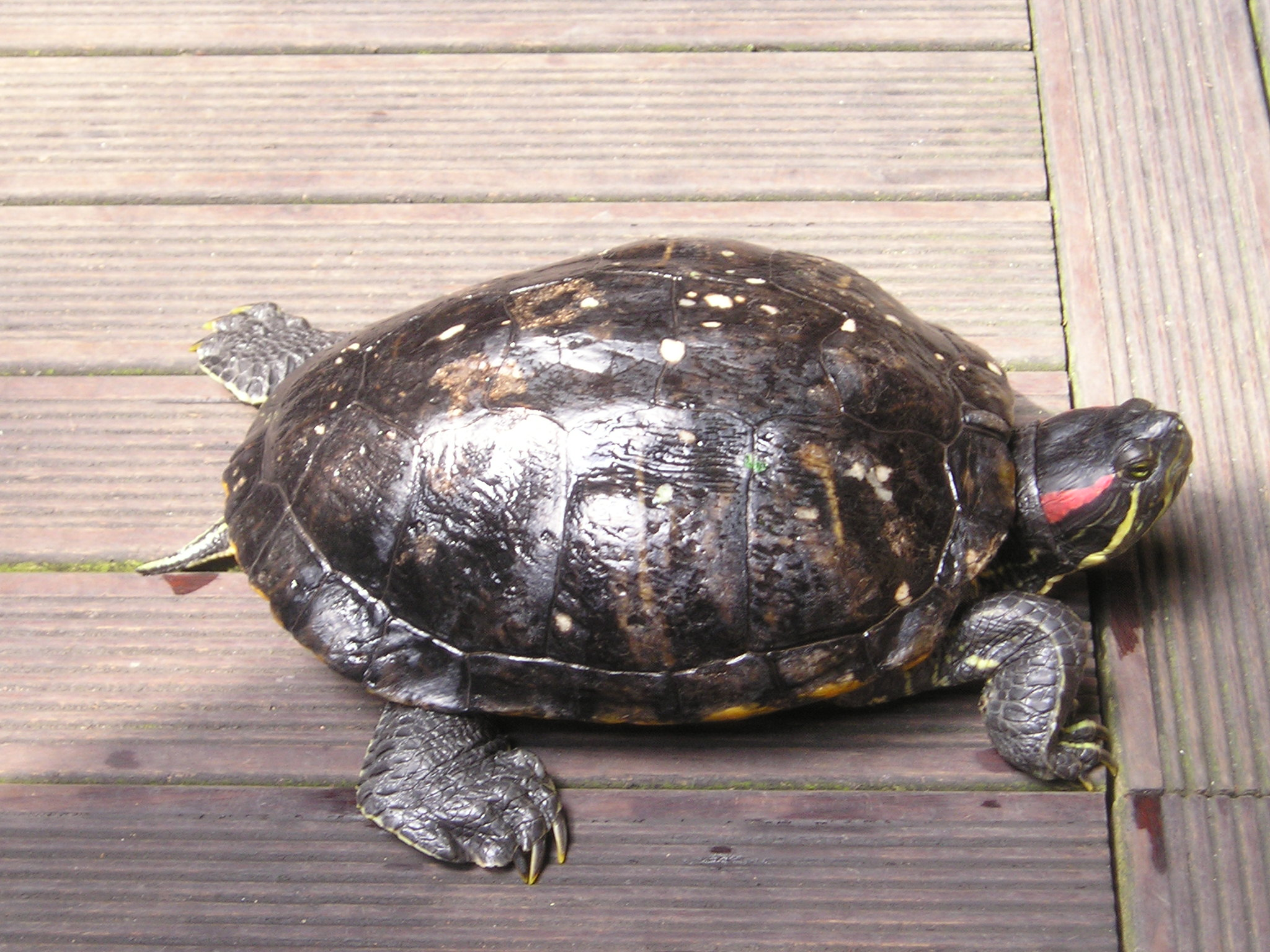
The terrapin can retract its head and extremities inside its shell if it feels threatened.

These terrapins also have a complete skeletal system, with partially webbed feet that help them to swim and that can be withdrawn inside the carapace along with the head and tail. The red stripe on each side of the head distinguishes the red-eared slider from all other North American species and gives this species its name, as the stripe is located behind the eyes, where their (external) ears would be. These stripes may lose their color over time. Color and vibrance of ear stripe can indicate immune health, with bright red having higher immune response than yellow stripes. Some individuals can also have a small mark of the same color on the top of their heads. The red-eared slider does not have a visible outer ear or an external auditory canal; instead, it relies on a middle ear entirely covered by a cartilaginous tympanic disc.

Like other chelonians, the species is poikilothermic and thus dependent on the temperature of its environment. For this reason, it needs to sunbathe frequently to warm up and maintain body temperature.

=== Sexual dimorphism ===
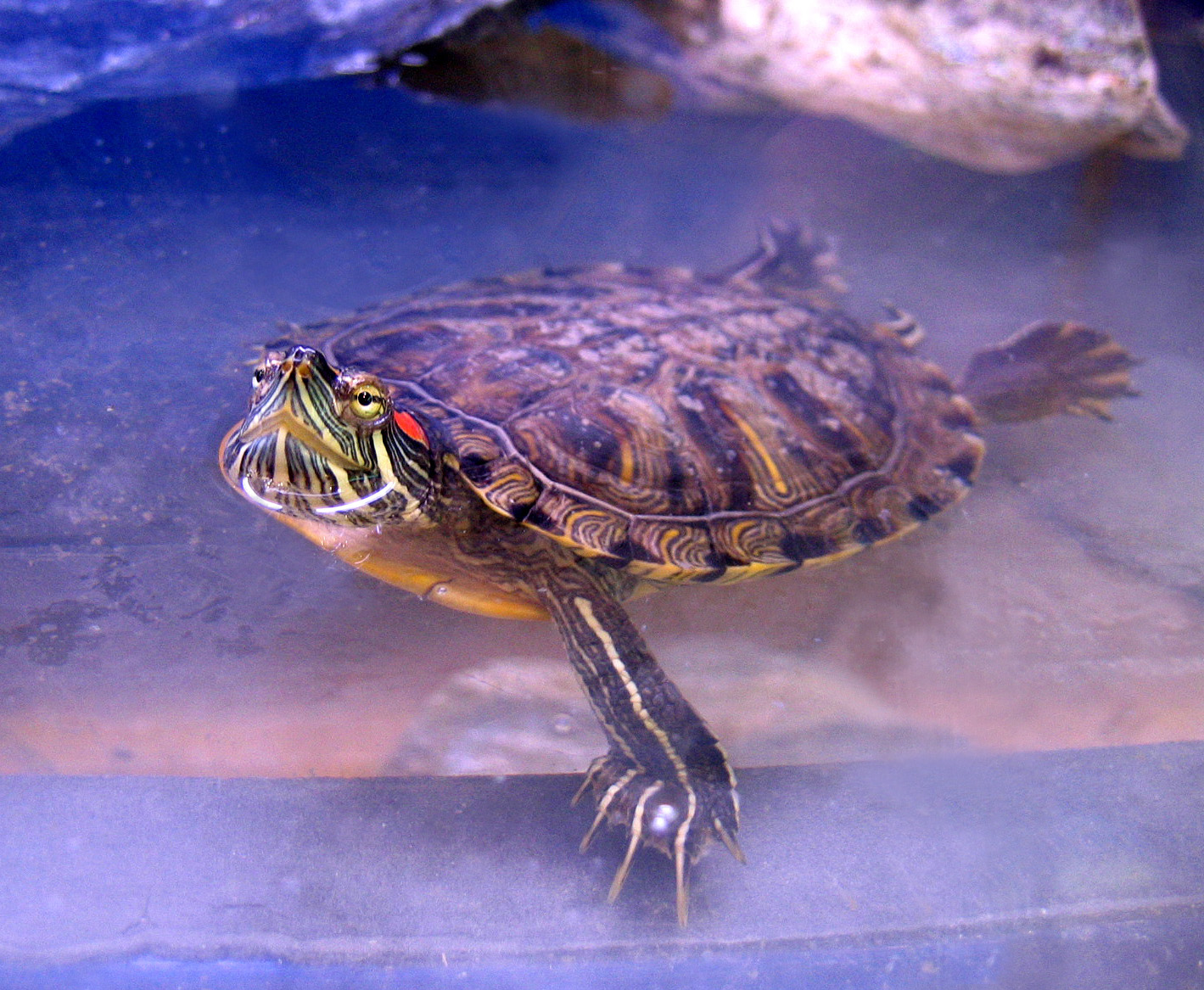
Male red-eared slider: Note the large claws on the front foot.

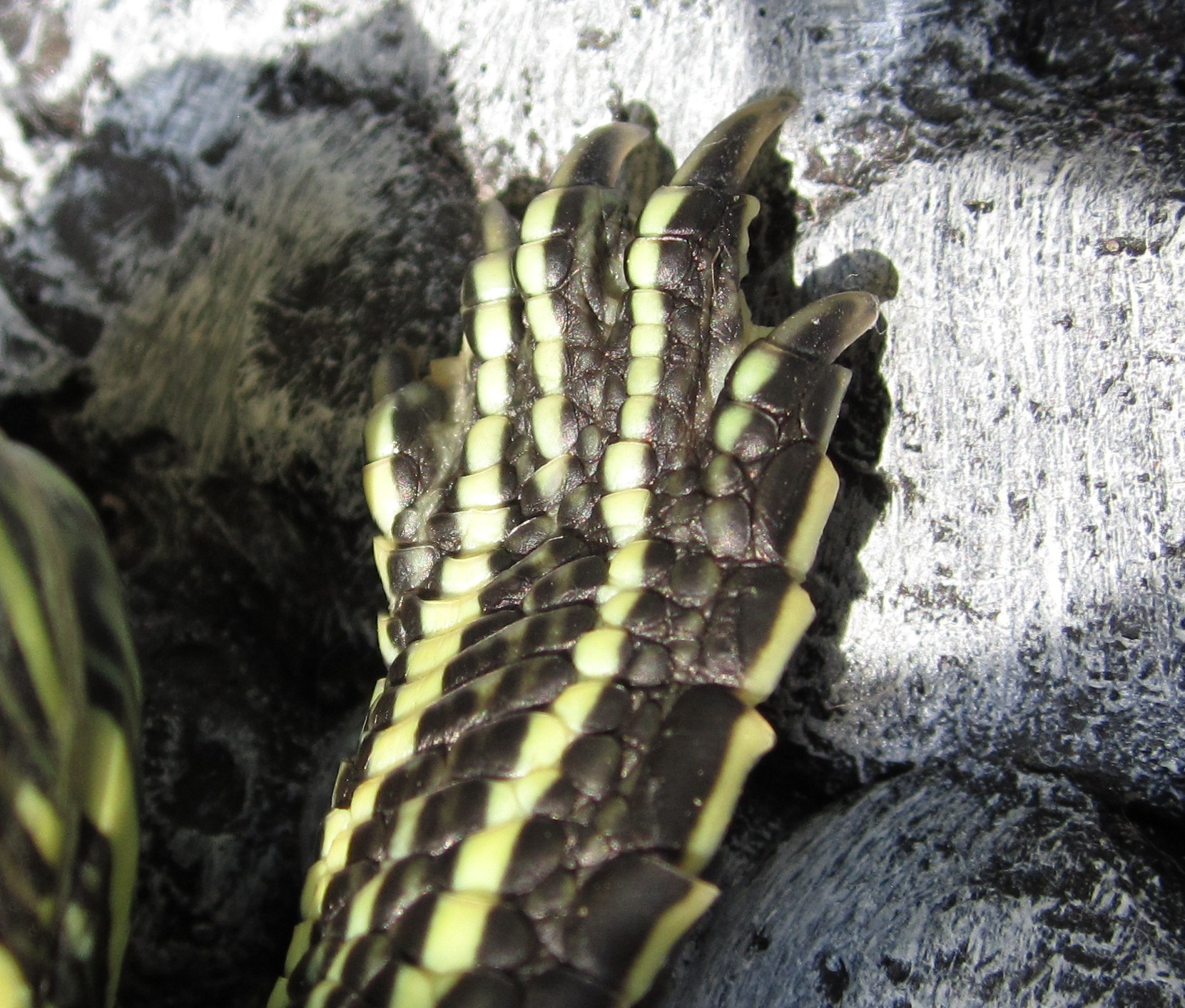
Female turtle's foot: Note the short claws.

Some dimorphism exists between males and females.

Red-eared slider young look practically identical regardless of their sex, making distinguishing them difficult. One useful method, however, is to inspect the markings under their carapace, which fade as the terrapins age. Distinguishing the sex of adults is much easier, as the shells of mature males are smaller than those of females. Male red-eared sliders reach sexual maturity when their carapaces' diameters measure 10 cm (3.9 in) and females reach maturity when their carapaces measure about 15 cm (5.9 in). Both males and females reach sexual maturity at 5–6 years old. Males are normally smaller than females, although this parameter is sometimes difficult to apply, as individuals being compared could be of different ages.

Males have longer claws on their front feet than the females; this helps them to hold onto a female during mating, and is used during courtship displays. The males' tails are thicker and longer. Typically, the cloacal opening of a female is at or under the rear edge of the carapace, while the male's opening occurs beyond the edge of the carapace. The male's plastron is slightly concave, while that of the female is completely flat. The male's concave plastron also helps to stabilize the male on the female's carapace during mating. Older males can sometimes have a dark greyish-olive green melanistic coloration, with very subdued markings. The red stripe on the sides of the head may be difficult to see or be absent. The female's appearance is substantially the same throughout her life.

== Distribution and habitat ==
The red-eared slider originated from the area around the Mississippi River and the Gulf of Mexico, in warm climates in the Southeastern United States. Their native areas range from the southeast of Colorado to Virginia and Florida. In nature, they inhabit areas with a source of still, warm water, such as ponds, lakes, swamps, creeks, streams, or slow-flowing rivers. It is also able to survive in brackish waters.

They live in areas of calm water, where they are able to leave the water easily by climbing onto rocks or tree trunks so they can warm up in the sun. Individuals are often found sunbathing in a group or even on top of each other. They also require abundant aquatic plants, as these are the adults' main food, although they are omnivores. They are, however, carnivorous as juveniles as they require a high protein intake for growth. Turtles in the wild always remain close to water unless they are searching for a new habitat or when females leave the water to lay their eggs.

=== Invasive species ===
Invasive red-eared sliders cause negative impacts in the ecosystems they are introduced to because they have certain advantages over the native populations, such as a lower age at maturity, higher fecundity rates, and larger body size, which gives them a competitive advantage at basking and nesting sites, as well as when exploiting food resources. They also transmit diseases and displace the other chelonian species with which they compete for food and breeding space.

Owing to their popularity as pets, red-eared sliders have been released or escaped into the wild in many parts of the world. This terrapin is considered one of the world's worst invasive species. (Note: Lowe, S.; Browne, M.; Boudjelas, S.; de Poorter, M. (November 2004) [2000]. 100 of the world's worst invasive alien species: A selection from the Global Invasive Species Database (PDF). The Invasive Species Specialist Group (ISSG) of the Species Survival Commission (SSC) (Report) (Updated and reprinted ed.). International Union for the Conservation of Nature (IUCN). Archived from the original (PDF) on 22 December 2018. See also original edition: Lowe, Browne, et al. (2000).) Today, they can be found on six out of seven continents (everywhere except for Antarctica). Feral populations are now found in Bermuda, Canada, Australia, Europe, Great Britain, South Africa, the Caribbean Islands, Israel, Bahrain, the Mariana Islands, Guam, Russia, and south- and far-east Asia. Within Great Britain, red-eared sliders have a wide distribution throughout England, Scotland, and Wales. In Spain, the red-eared slider is in direct competition with Mauremys leprosa for food and basking spots. The red-eared slider has a certain advantage over M. leprosa.

In Australia, it is illegal for members of the public to import, keep, trade, or release red-eared sliders, as they are regarded as an invasive species – see below. Their import has also been banned by the European Union as well as specific EU member countries. In 2015, Japan announced it was planning to ban the import of red-eared sliders, and officially established in June 2023. While this bans it and red swamp crayfish from importing, trading and releasing to the wild, it is still able to keep it alive at home.

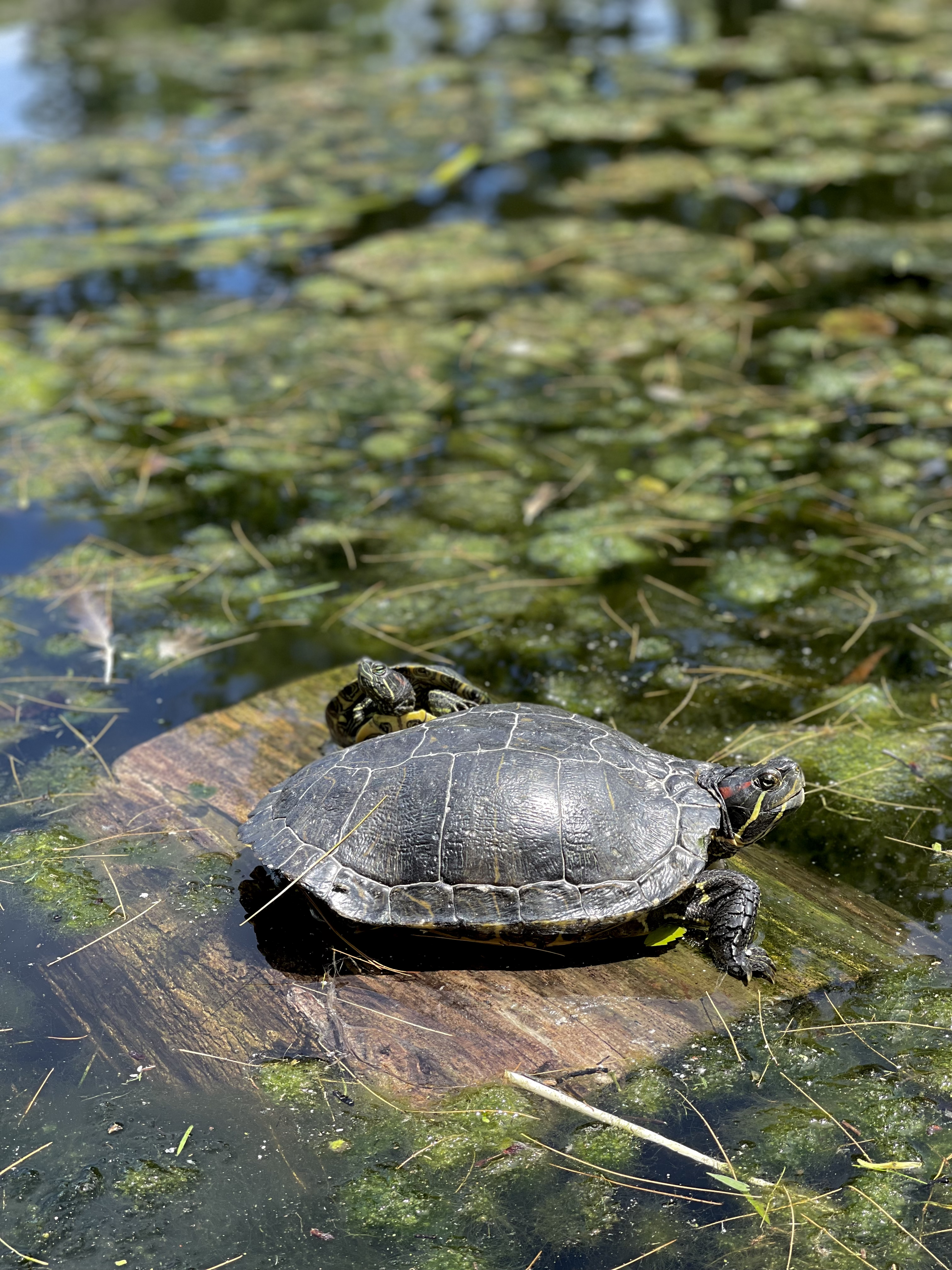
A young red-eared slider climbing onto the back of an older one to bask in the sun

== Behavior ==
Red-eared sliders are almost entirely aquatic, but as they are cold-blooded, they leave the water to sunbathe to regulate their temperature.

Flipping over procedure extending the neck

=== Hibernation ===
Red-eared sliders do not hibernate, but actually brumate; while they become less active, they do occasionally rise to the surface for food or air. Brumation can occur to varying degrees. In the wild, red-eared sliders brumate over the winter at the bottoms of ponds or shallow lakes. They generally become inactive in October, when temperatures fall below 10 °C (50 °F). During this time, the terrapins enter a state of sopor, during which they do not eat or defecate, they remain nearly motionless, and the frequency of their breathing falls. Individuals usually brumate under water, but they have also been found under banks and rocks, and in hollow stumps. In warmer winter climates, they can become active and come to the surface for basking. When the temperature begins to drop again, however, they quickly return to a brumation state. Sliders generally come up for food in early March to as late as the end of April.

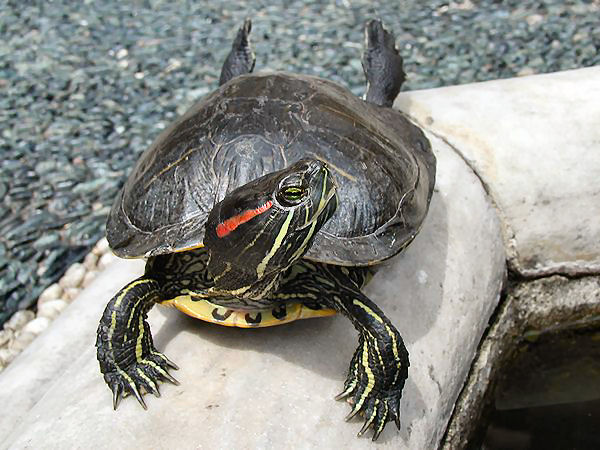
Red-eared slider sunbathing: Heat absorption is more effective when their limbs are stretched outwards.

During brumation, T. s. elegans can survive anaerobically for weeks, producing ATP from glycolysis. The terrapin's metabolic rate drops dramatically, with heart rate and cardiac output dropping by 80% to minimize energy requirements. The lactic acid produced is buffered by minerals in the shell, preventing acidosis. Red-eared sliders kept captive indoors should not brumate.

=== Reproduction ===
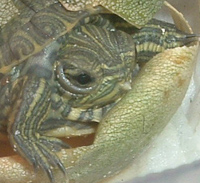
Hatching turtle with its egg tooth

Courtship and mating activities for red-eared sliders usually occur between March and July, and take place under water. During courtship, the male swims around the female and flutters or vibrates the back side of his long claws on and around her face and head, possibly to direct pheromones towards her. The female swims toward the male, and if she is receptive, sinks to the bottom for mating. If the female is not receptive, she may become aggressive towards the male. Courtship can last 45 minutes, but mating takes only 10 minutes.

On occasion, a male may appear to be courting another male, and when kept in captivity may also show this behaviour towards other household pets. Between male terrapins, it could be a sign of dominance and may preclude a fight. Young terrapins may carry out the courtship dance before they reach sexual maturity at 5 years of age, but they are unable to mate.

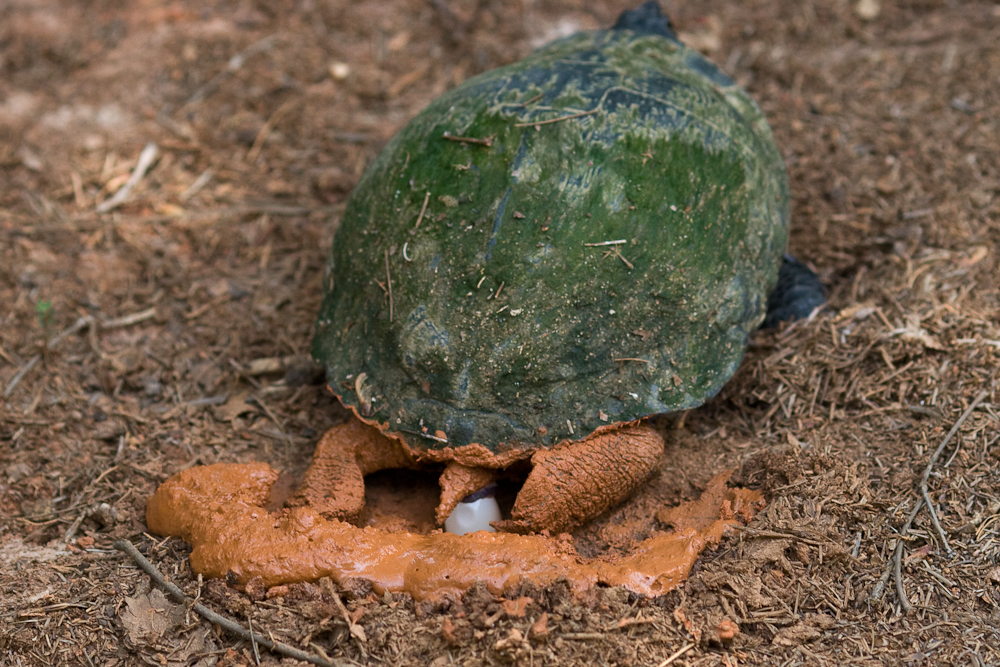
Female laying eggs in a nest she dug out with her hind legs

After mating, the female spends extra time basking to keep her eggs warm. She may also have a change of diet, eating only certain foods, or not eating as much as she normally would. A female can lay between two and 30 eggs depending on body size and other factors. One female can lay up to 5 clutches in the same year, and clutches are usually spaced 12–36 days apart. The time between mating and egg-laying can be days or weeks. The fertilization and laying can also be in conjunction, with eggs immediately laid based on location and nutrients available. The actual egg fertilization takes place during the egg-laying. This process also permits the laying of fertile eggs the following season, as the sperm can remain viable and available in the female's body in the absence of mating. During the last weeks of gestation, the female spends less time in the water and smells and scratches at the ground, indicating she is searching for a suitable place to lay her eggs. The female excavates a hole, using her hind legs, and lays her eggs in it.

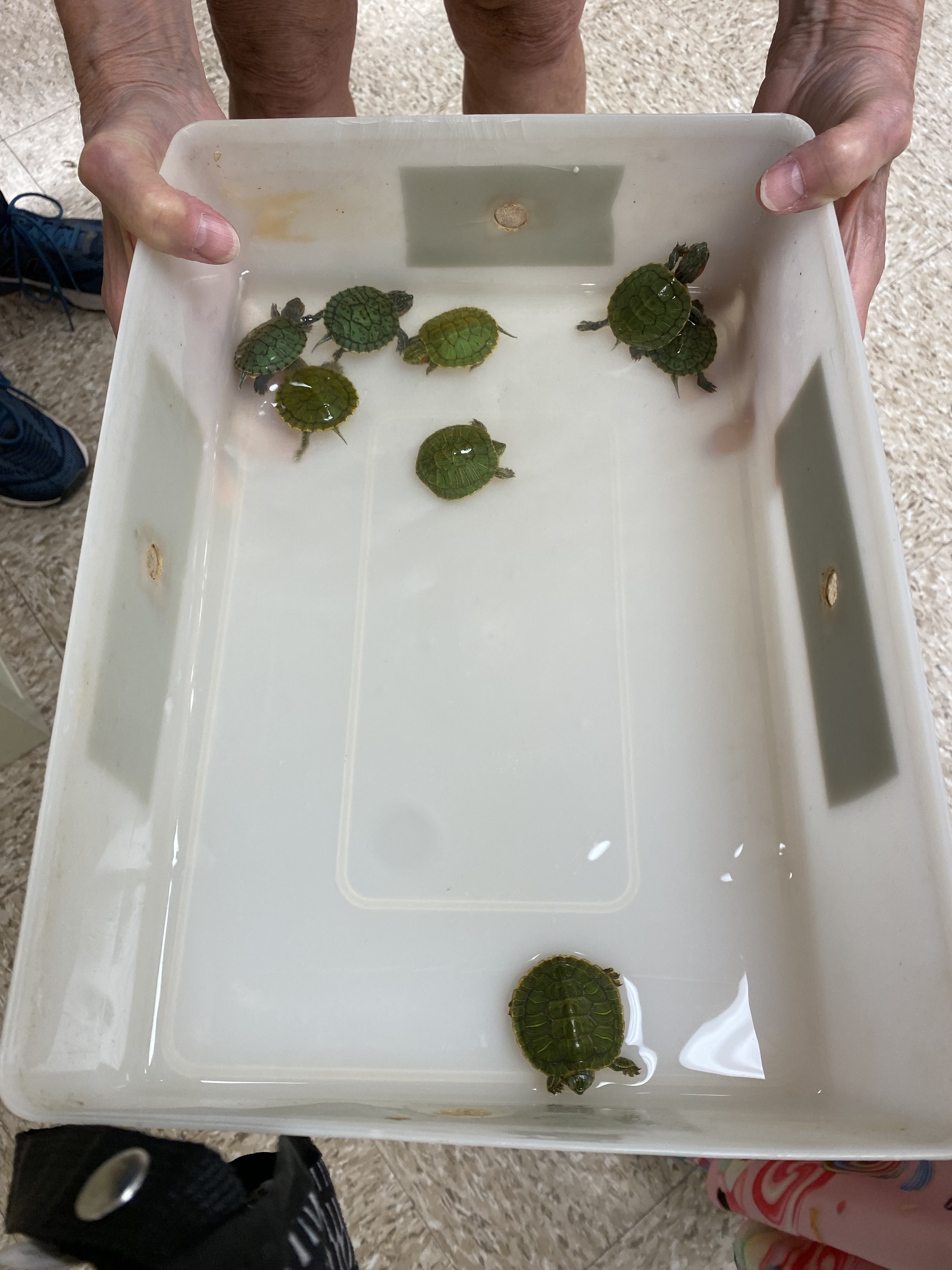
A turn of hatchlings held by a biologist in Natchez, Mississippi

Incubation takes 59–112 days. Late-season hatchlings may spend the winter in the nest and emerge when the weather warms in the spring. Just prior to hatching, the egg contains 50% terrapin and 50% egg sac. A new hatchling breaks open its egg with its egg tooth, which falls out about an hour after hatching. This egg tooth never grows back. Hatchlings may stay inside their eggshells after hatching for the first day or two. If they are forced to leave the eggshell before they are ready, they will return if possible. When a hatchling decides to leave the shell, it still has a small sac protruding from its plastron. The yolk sac is vital and provides nourishment while visible, and several days later, it will have been absorbed into the terrapin's belly. The sac must be absorbed, and does not fall off. The split must heal on its own before the terrapin is able to swim. The time between the egg hatching and water entry is 21 days.

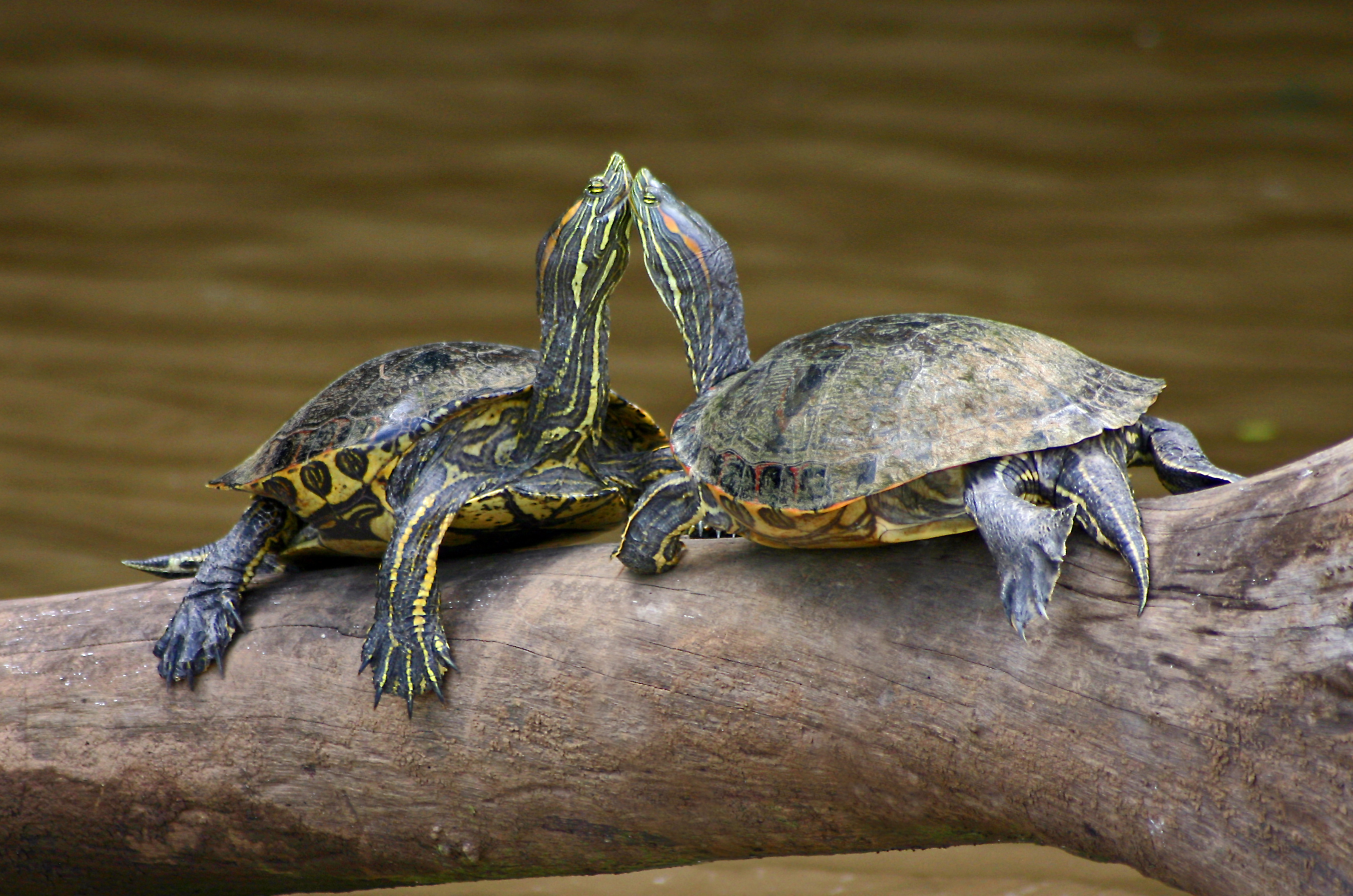
A pair of mature red-eared sliders

Damage to or inordinate motion of the protruding egg yolk – enough to allow air into the terrapin's body – results in death. This is the main reason for marking the top of terrapin eggs if their relocation is required for any reason. An egg turned upside down will eventually terminate the embryo's growth by the sac smothering the embryo. If it manages to reach term, the terrapin will try to flip over with the yolk sac, which would allow air into the body cavity and cause death. The other fatal danger is water getting into the body cavity before the sac is absorbed completely, and while the opening has not completely healed yet.

The sex of red-eared sliders is determined by the incubation temperature during critical phases of the embryos' development. This is a phenomenon known as temperature-dependent sex determination. Only males are produced when eggs are incubated at temperatures of 22–27 °C (72–81 °F), whereas females develop at warmer temperatures. Colder temperatures result in the death of the embryos.

== As pets, invasive species, and human infection risk ==
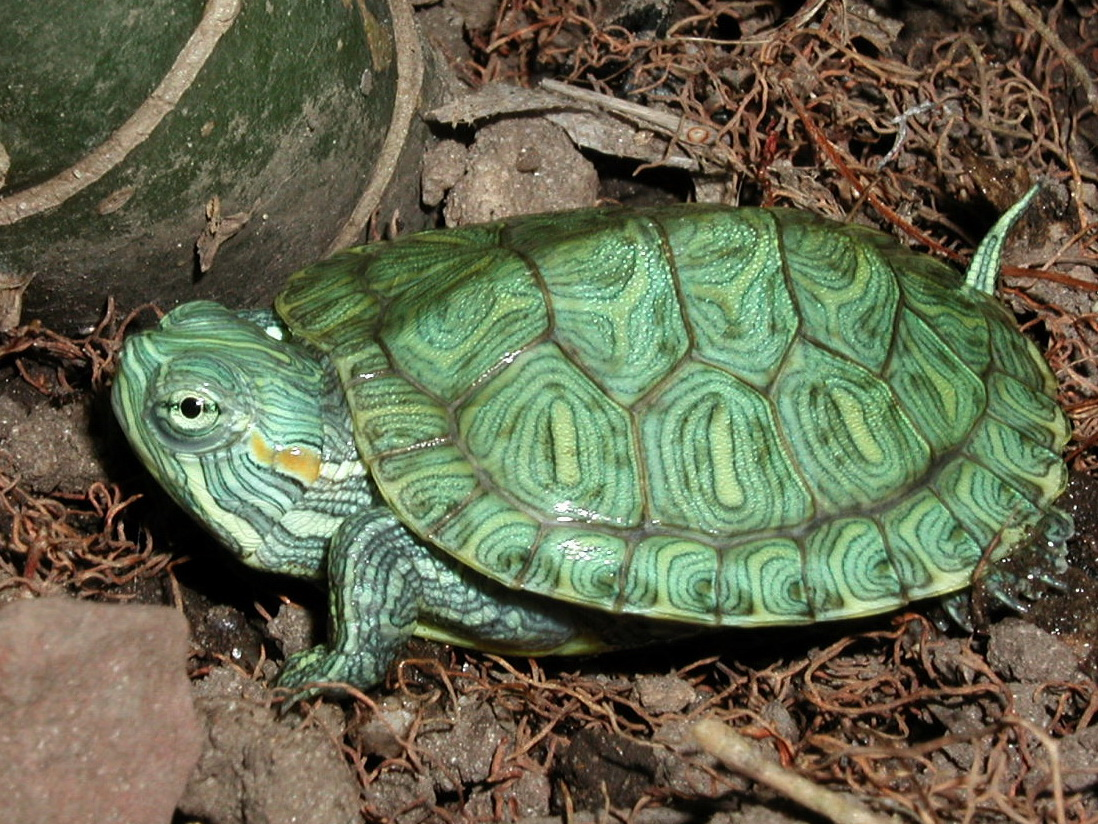
T. s. elegans

Red-eared slider terrapins are the world's most commonly traded reptile, due to their relatively low price, and usually low food price, small size, and easy maintenance. As with other chelonians individuals that survive their first year or two can be expected to live generally around 30 years. They present an infection risk; particularly of Salmonella.

=== Infection risks and United States federal regulations on commercial distribution ===
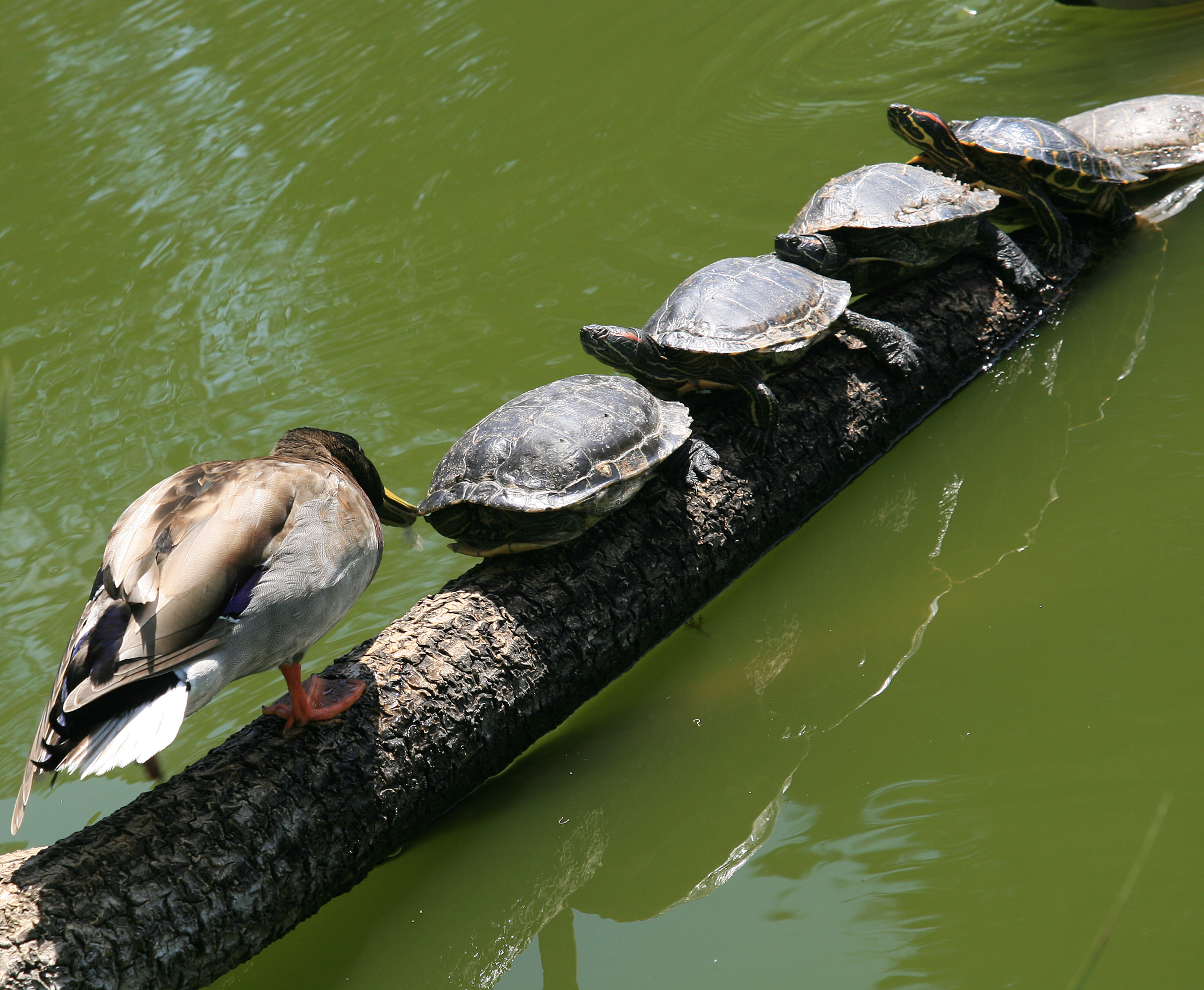
A line of basking red-eared sliders faces an inquisitive mallard.

Reptiles are asymptomatic (meaning they suffer no adverse side effects) carriers of bacteria of the genus Salmonella. This has given rise to justifiable concerns given the many instances of infection of humans caused by the handling of chelonians, which has led to restrictions in the sale of red-eared sliders in the United States. A 1975 U.S. Food and Drug Administration (FDA) regulation bans the sale (for general commercial and public use) of both chelonian eggs and chelonians with a carapace length less than 4 in (10 cm). This regulation comes under the Public Health Service Act, and is enforced by the FDA in cooperation with state and local health jurisdictions. The ban was enacted because of the public-health impact of chelonian-associated salmonellosis. Chelonians and chelonian eggs found to be offered for sale in violation of this provision are subject to destruction in accordance with FDA procedures. A fine up to $1,001 and / or imprisonment for up to one year is the penalty for those who refuse to comply with a valid final demand for destruction of such chelonians or their eggs. (Note: ""4 Inch Law", actually an FDA regulation". FAQ. GCTTS. See also) Many stores and flea markets still sell small chelonians due to an exception in the FDA regulation that allows chelonians under 4 in (10 cm) to be sold "for bona fide scientific, educational, or exhibition purposes, other than use as pets." As with many other animals and inanimate objects, the risk of Salmonella exposure can be reduced by following basic rules of cleanliness. Small children must be taught to wash their hands immediately after they finish playing with the chelonian, feeding it, or changing its water.

=== US state laws ===
Some states have other laws and regulations regarding possession of red-eared sliders because they can be an invasive species where they are not native and have been introduced through the pet trade. It is illegal in Florida to sell any wild-type red-eared slider, as they interbreed with the local yellow-bellied slider population, T. s. scripta, which is another subspecies of pond sliders, and hybrids typically combine the markings of the two subspecies. However, unusual color varieties such as albino and pastel red-eared sliders, which are derived from captive breeding, are still allowed for sale.

Red-eared slider swimming in an outdoor koi pond

=== Invasive status in Australia ===
In Australia, breeding populations have been found in New South Wales and Queensland, and individual turtles have been found in the wild in Victoria, the Australian Capital Territory, and Western Australia.

Red-eared slider turtles are considered a significant threat to native turtle species; they mature more quickly, grow larger, produce more offspring, and are more aggressive. Numerous studies indicate that red-eared slider turtles can out-compete native turtles for food and nesting and basking sites. Unlike the general diet of pet red-eared sliders, wild red-eared sliders are usually omnivorous. Because red-eared slider turtles eat plants as well as animals, they could also have a negative impact on a range of native aquatic species, including rare frogs. Also, a significant risk exists that red-eared slider turtles can transfer diseases and parasites to native reptile species. A malaria-like parasite was spread to two wild turtle populations in Lane Cove River, Sydney.

Social and economic costs are also likely to be substantial. The Queensland government has invested close to AU$1 million in eradication programs to date. The turtle may also cause significant public-health costs due to the impacts of turtle-associated salmonella on human health. Outbreaks in multiple states and fatalities in children, associated with handling Salmonella-infected turtles, have been recorded in the US. Salmonella can also spread to humans when turtles contaminate drinking water.

The actions by state governments have varied considerably to date, ranging from ongoing eradication efforts by the Queensland government to very little action by the government of New South Wales. Experts have ranked the species as high priority for management in Australia, and are calling for a national prevention and eradication strategy, including a concerted education and compliance program to stop the illegal trade, possession, and release of slider turtles. (Note: For example see and)

=== Invasive status in India ===
Red-eared slider turtles are threatening to invade the natural water bodies across northeast India, which are home to 21 out of 29 vulnerable native Indian species of freshwater turtle. Between August 2018 and June 2019, a team of herpetologists from the NGO "Help Earth" found red-eared sliders in the Deepor Beel wildlife sanctuary and Ugratara Devalaya temple pond. Further reports have been made from an unnamed stream, feeding into the Tlawng river, on a farm in the Mizoram capital, Aizawl. The Nodal Center for Biological Invasions, part of Forest research institute in Kerala is working on addressing the issue of capturing and removing these turtles from wild and from pet owners.

== In popular culture ==
Within the second volume of the Tales of the Teenage Mutant Ninja Turtles, the popular comic-book heroes were revealed as specimens of the red-eared slider. The popularity of the Ninja Turtles, coupled with the release of the first live-action film, led to a craze for keeping them as pets in United Kingdom, with subsequent ecological havoc, as turtles were accidentally or deliberately released into the wild.

== See also ==
- Red-eared slider × yellow-bellied slider, an intergradation of a red-eared slider and yellow-bellied slider subspecies.
- Yellow-bellied slider
- Cumberland slider
