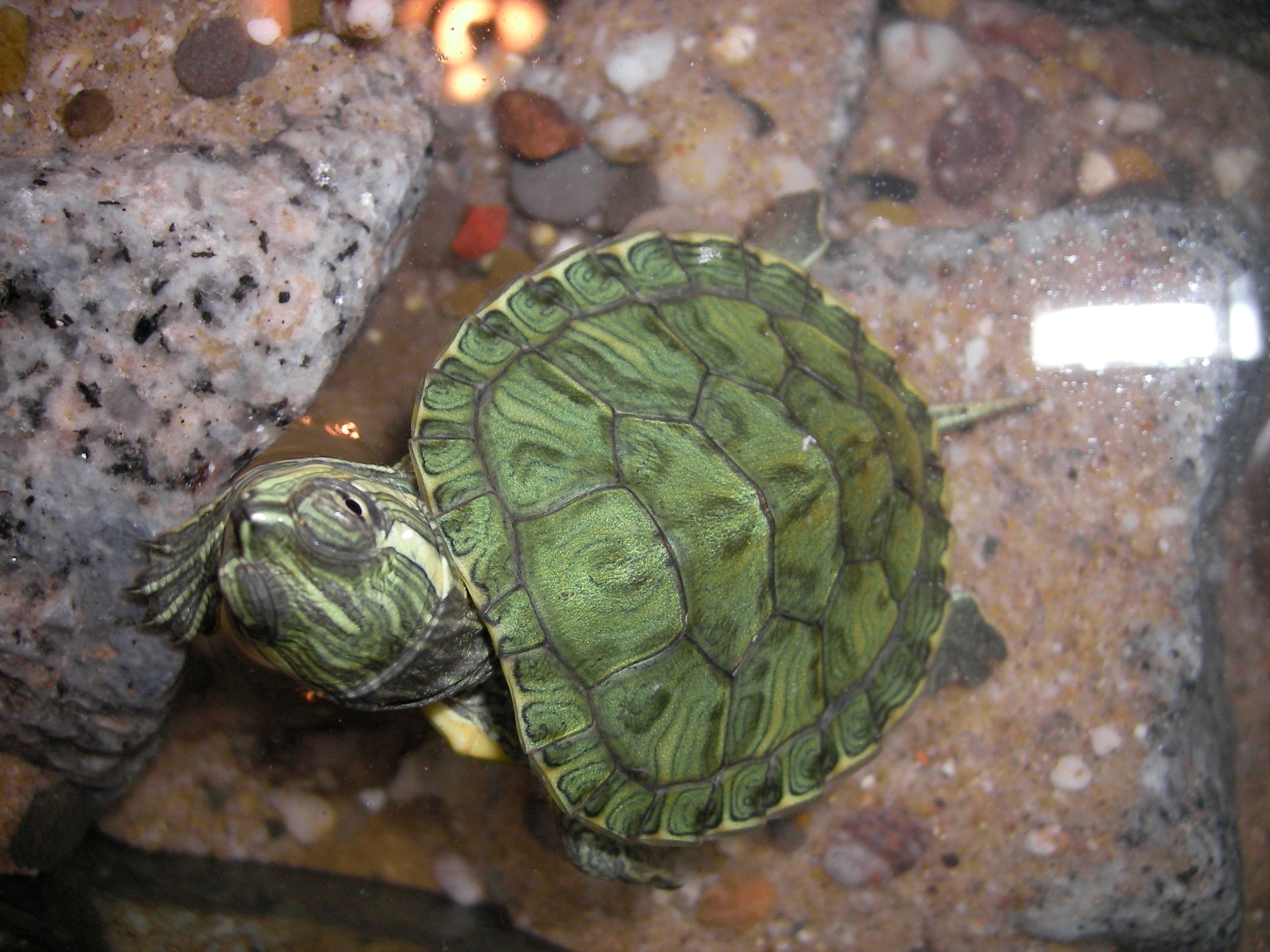
- Trachemys scripta troostii, hatchling

Conservation status
- Apparently Secure (NatureServe)

Scientific classification
- Kingdom: Animalia
- Phylum: Chordata
- Class: Reptilia
- Order: Testudines
- Suborder: Cryptodira
- Family: Emydidae
- Genus: Trachemys
- Species: T. scripta
- Subspecies: T. s. troostii

Trinomial name
- Trachemys scripta troostii (Holbrook, 1836)
- Range map of the three subspecies of pond slider. The Cumberland slider is shown in blue.

Synonyms
- Emys troostii Holbrook, 1836; Emys cumberlandensis Holbrook, 1840; Trachemys troostii — Agassiz, 1857; Clemmys troostii — Strauch, 1862; Pseudemys troostii — Cope, 1875; Chrysemys troostii — Boulenger, 1889; Pseudemys troosti [sic] Zeleny & Faust, 1915 (ex errore); Pseudemys scripta troostii — Carr, 1937; Pseudemys troostii troostii — Stejneger & Barbour, 1939; Pseudemys scripta troosti — E. Williams, 1950; Chrysemys scripta troosti — Weaver & Rose, 1967; Chrysemys scripta troostii — Ernst & Barbour, 1972; Trachemys scripta troosti — Iverson, 1985; Trachemys scripta troostii — Iverson, 1986

= Cumberland slider =

Subspecies of turtle

The Cumberland slider (Trachemys scripta troostii), also called commonly the Cumberland turtle and Troost's turtle, is a subspecies of pond slider, a semiaquatic turtle in the family Emydidae. The subspecies is indigenous to the Southeastern United States.

== Etymology ==
The subspecific name, troostii, is in honor of Dutch-American naturalist Gerard Troost.

== Taxonomy ==
T. s. troostii, a subspecies of T. scripta, was formerly placed in the genus Pseudemys. The Cumberland slider occurs in a different geographic location from the yellow-bellied slider (T. s. scripta). Intergradation does not occur between these two subspecies.

== Description ==
The carapace of T. s. troostii is olive brown with yellow markings. It has two rounded projections on the posterior edge of the shell, and is slightly keeled. The adult carapace is wrinkled and oval shaped. The plastron is hingeless and slightly smaller than the carapace. Each of the bottom sides of the marginals has a spot. The skin is brown with an olive to greenish tint with yellow striping. There is a distinct bar behind the eyes that can vary from yellow to red and be either thin or wide. The plastron of the turtle has dark spots, as well as the ridge of the carapace. Also, the plastron has yellow bars or stripes. The turtle's legs in front have larger yellow stripes than most slider species. There is a yellow and orange stripe directly behind each eye. The stripe is never entirely one color, it starts out yellow and then fades into a dark orange-to-red color closer to the back of the neck.

== Behavior ==
T. s. troostii is a communal basker. It basks on protrusions out of the water and may bask in stacks or with other species. It is active from April to October. "Slider" comes from its habit of sliding into the water when alarmed while basking, going to deep water for safety, where most predators cannot pursue it.

== Geographic range and habitat ==
T. s. troostii is found throughout the Mississippi and Tennessee River drainages, and the Southeastern United States. This subspecies prefers quiet waters with muddy bottoms. Ponds, lakes, and streams, with a profusion of aquatic vegetation, organic substrate, and overhanging basking spots, are especially favored.

Most people agree that the native lands of the Cumberland slider are in the Cumberland River Valley, ranging in Kentucky and Tennessee, but with the exotic animal trade, it has become a common sight even in Alabama, Georgia, and Illinois.

== Reproduction ==
Breeding of T. s. troostii takes place in spring, fall, and winter. The male and female go through a mating ritual in which the male "claws" at the female's face and his fore legs stiffen. The female then allows the male to mount. The females may go extremely far from the water to nest and are occasionally hit by cars while crossing roads. Females construct a nest, usually at night, in various soil types. Clutch size is six to 15 eggs with 71% of the females producing two clutches per year.

== Diet ==
T. s. troostii is mostly herbivorous as an adult, but primarily carnivorous as a juvenile. The adults eat algae, fish, tadpoles, crayfish, seeds, plants, aquatic vegetation, insects, worms, and mollusks. This subspecies, like all aquatic turtles, can only swallow food when in the water.
