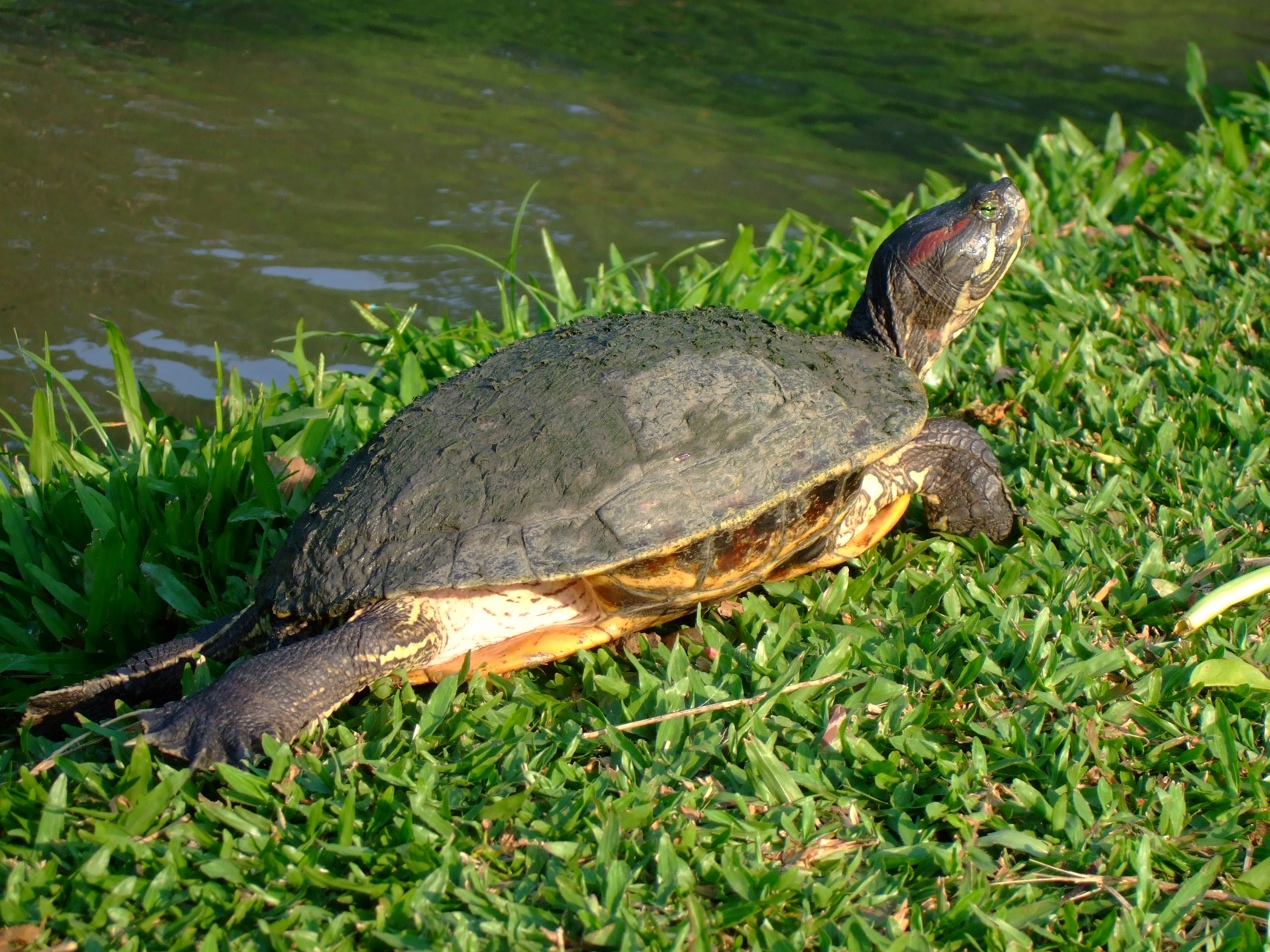
- Trachemys scripta elegans, the red-eared slider

Conservation status
- Least Concern (IUCN 3.1)

Scientific classification
- Kingdom: Animalia
- Phylum: Chordata
- Class: Reptilia
- Order: Testudines
- Suborder: Cryptodira
- Family: Emydidae
- Genus: Trachemys
- Species: T. scripta

Binomial name
- Trachemys scripta (Thunberg and Schoepff, 1792)
- Subspecies native range map in the United States. Current subspecies ranges include non-native, introduced areas and may be considered as invasive. red-eared slider (also in Mexico) yellow-bellied slider Cumberland slider

Synonyms
- Pseudemys scripta

= Pond slider =

Species of turtle

The pond slider (Trachemys scripta) is a species of common, medium-sized, semiaquatic turtle. Three subspecies are described, the most recognizable of which is the red-eared slider (T. s. elegans), which is popular in the pet trade and has been introduced to other parts of the world by people releasing it to the wild. Hatchling and juvenile pond sliders have a green upper shell (carapace), yellow bottom shell (plastron), and green and yellow stripes and markings on their skin. These patterns and colors in the skin and shell fade with age until the carapace is a muted olive green to brown and the plastron is a dull yellow or darker. Some sliders become almost black with few visible markings. The carapace is oval with a bit of rounding and a central crest with knobs, but these features soften and fade with age, adults being smoother and flatter. For determining an adult slider's sex, males typically have much longer front claws than adult females, while females usually have shorter, more slender tails than males. Their lifespans range from 20 to 50 years.

== Etymology ==
The origin of the name slider stems from the behavior of these turtles when startled. Groups of sliders, sometimes quite large, as well as many other types of less abundant freshwater turtles, are often seen basking and sunning on logs, branches, and vegetation at or even well above the water's surface, but they readily and quickly scramble if they sense danger, shooting back in and darting away to safety underwater.

== Distribution ==
Pond sliders are native to the south-central and southeastern United States and northern Mexico.

=== Subspecies ===
Image	Subspecies	Distribution
	T. s. scripta – yellow-bellied slider	from Florida to southeastern Virginia
	T. s. elegans – red-eared slider	Midwestern United States to northern Mexico
	T. s. troostii – Cumberland slider	Southeastern United States.

== Invasive species ==
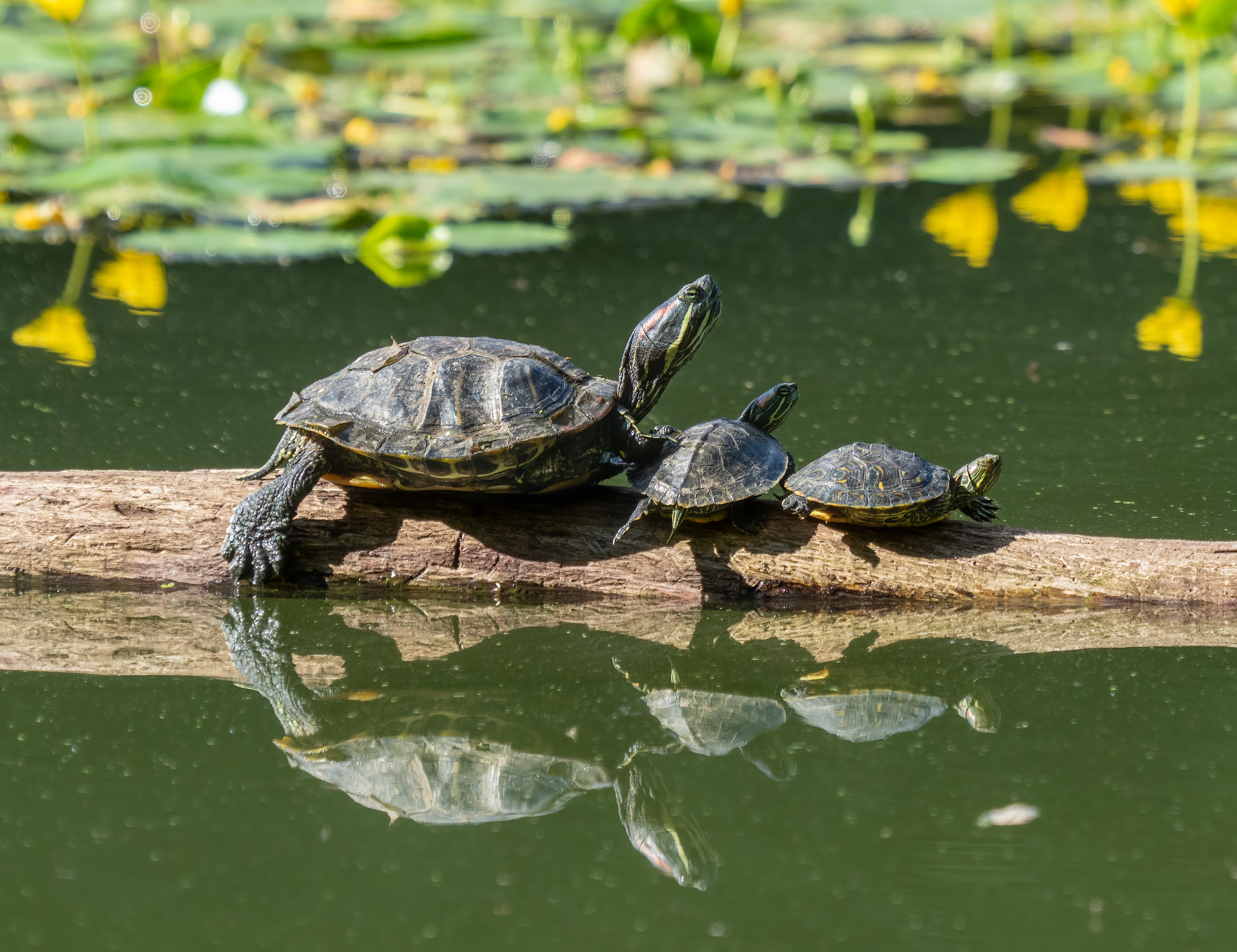
An adult and young T. s. elegans with a young T. s. scripta in New York, USA, where they are invasive species

Red-eared slider in Tokyo

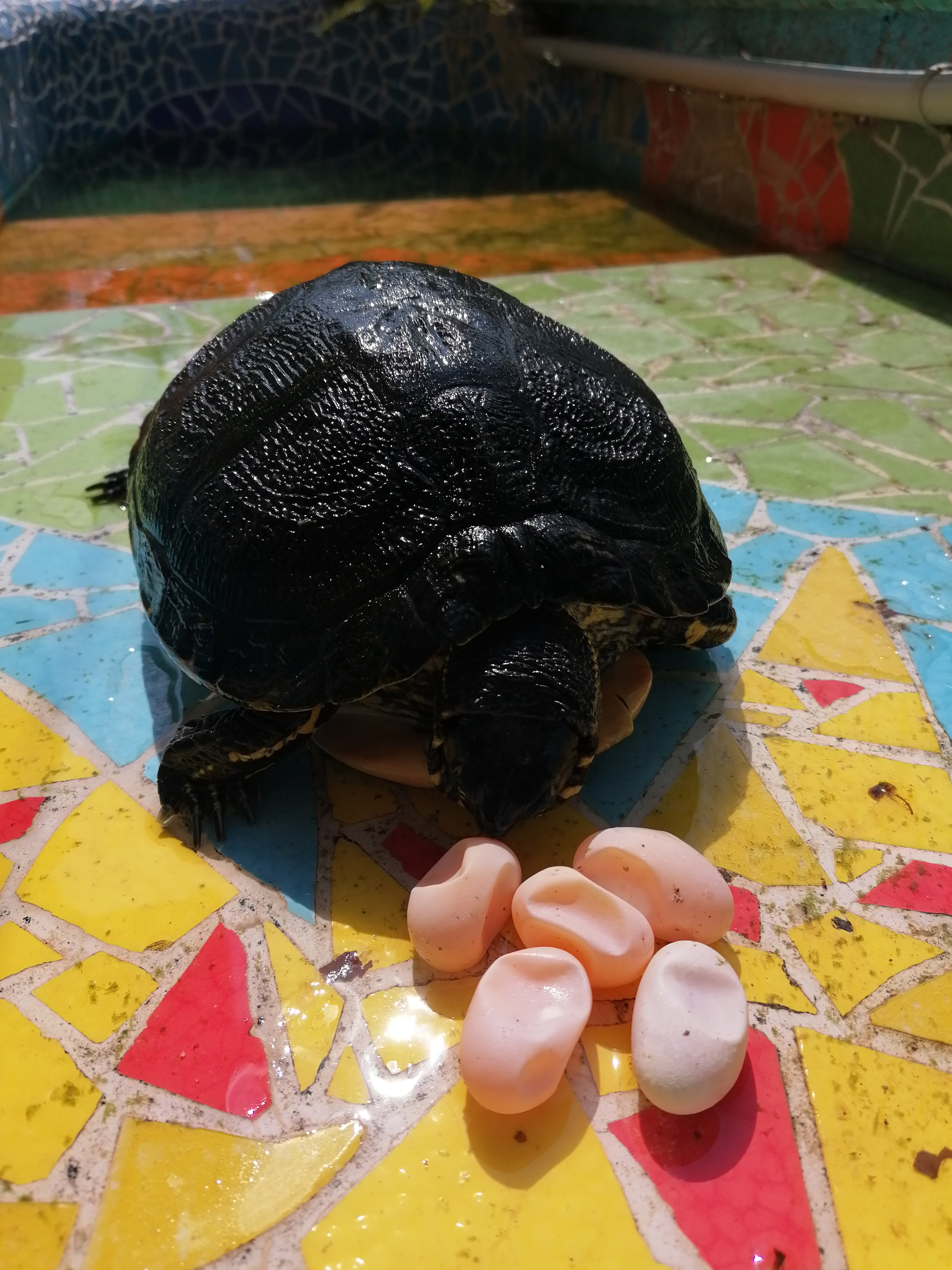
A specimen of T. s. scripta with its eggs (Italy)

In the 1900s, many pond sliders were captured for sale. In the 1950s, millions of turtles were being farmed and shipped abroad as part of the pet trade.

These turtles often compete with native species for food, habitat, and other resources. Eventually, they bully many native species out of basking sites, where sunlight (and warmth) is available for the species. When basking, pond sliders commonly bask on birds' nests, thereby killing the eggs. They also prey on young birds.

Turtles that were raised in captivity can develop diseases that are unfamiliar to native species, which can be harmful. Turtles raised in captivity are often released because they become too much to handle or grow bigger than expected. Not uncommonly, they also escape.

Conservationists have warned owners not to release these turtles into the wild. Many states also have passed legislation to control the possession and release of pond sliders. Two states have banned their sale entirely.

In Europe, T. scripta is included since 2016 in the list of Invasive Alien Species of Union concern (the Union list). This implies that this species cannot be imported, bred, transported, commercialized, or intentionally released into the environment in the whole of the European Union. By the first quarter of the 21st century, this species has spread widely across the waters of Europe and Southeast Asia, and is also found in the Urals and Siberia.

Hybridization between yellow-bellied and red-eared sliders is not uncommon where the ranges of the two subspecies overlap.
