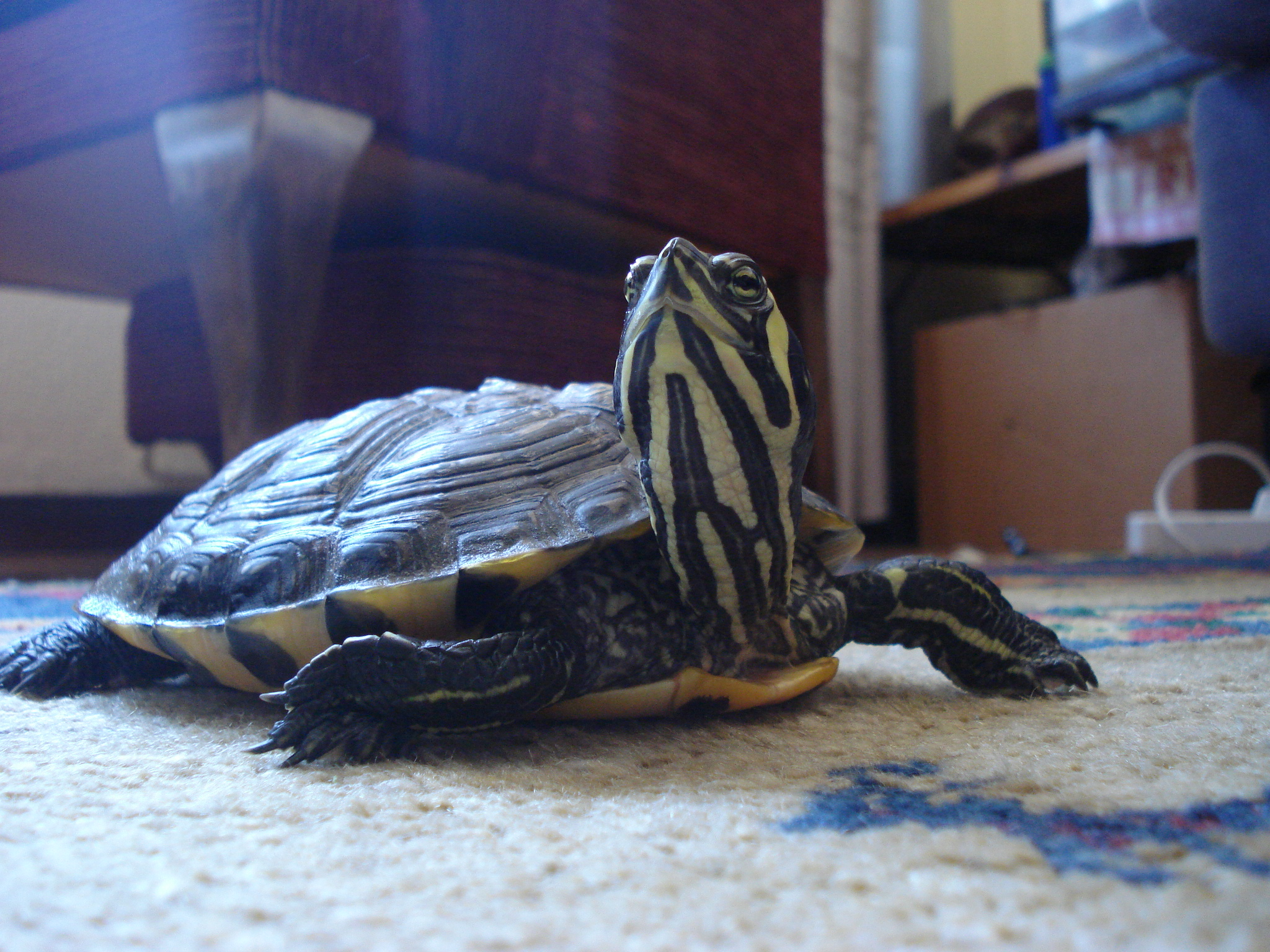
- female yellow-bellied slider

Conservation status
- Least Concern (IUCN 3.1)

- Secure (NatureServe)

Scientific classification
- Kingdom: Animalia
- Phylum: Chordata
- Class: Reptilia
- Order: Testudines
- Suborder: Cryptodira
- Family: Emydidae
- Genus: Trachemys
- Species: T. scripta
- Subspecies: T. s. scripta

Trinomial name
- Trachemys scripta scripta (Thunberg in Schoepff, 1792)
- The ranges of the three subspecies of pond slider. The yellow-bellied slider is in yellow.

Synonyms
- Testudo scripta Schoepff, 1792; Testudo serrata Daudin, 1801; Emys scripta Schweigger, 1812; Emys serrata Schweigger, 1812; Emys vittata Gray, 1831; Terrapene serrata Bonaparte, 1831; Clemmys (Clemmys) serrata Fitzinger, 1835; Pseudemys serrata Gray, 1856; Trachemys scripta Gray, 1863; Chrysemys scripta Boulenger, 1889; Pseudemys scripta Jordan, 1899; Chrysemys [scripta] scripta Siebenrock, 1909; Chrysemys palustris scripta Lindholm, 1929; Pseudemys scripta scripta Carr, 1937; Chrysemys scripts scripts Zappalorti, 1976 (ex errore); Pseudermys scripa Nutaphand, 1979 (ex errore); Trachemys scripta scripta Iverson, 1985

= Yellow-bellied slider =

Subspecies of turtle

The yellow-bellied slider (Trachemys scripta scripta) is a subspecies of the pond slider (Trachemys scripta), a semiaquatic turtle belonging to the family Emydidae. It is native to the southeastern United States, specifically from Florida to southeastern Virginia, and is the most common turtle species in its range. It is found in a wide variety of habitats, including slow-moving rivers, floodplain swamps, marshes, seasonal wetlands, and permanent ponds. Yellow-bellied sliders are popular as pets. They are a model organism for population studies due to their high population densities.

== Description ==
Adult male yellow-bellied sliders typically reach 5–9 inches (13–23 cm) in length; females range from 8–13 inches (20–33 cm). Melanistic males have been seen to grow larger than nonmelanistic males. The carapace (upper shell) is typically brown and black, often with yellow stripes. The skin is olive green with prominent patches of yellow down the neck and legs. As the name implies, the plastron (bottom shell) is mostly yellow with black spots along the edges. Adults tend to grow darker as they age. Yellow-bellied sliders are often confused with eastern river cooters, who also have yellow stripes on the neck and yellow undersides, but the latter lack the green spots characteristic of this species. The yellow belly often has an "s"-shaped yellow stripe on its face. They also have markings shaped like question marks on their bellies. Females of the species reach a larger body size than the males do in the same populations. There have also been studies that show females of this species have more symmetrical shells than males due to either more efficient growth or less hormonal stress. Other studies show that shells tend to grow more asymmetrical with age. Yellow-bellied sliders over winter in burrows on the bank or buried at the bottom of a pond. When buried in the water they use cloacal respiration gain oxygen. In colder climates they will undergo a restructuring of the ventricle tissue in their heart increasing fibrillar collagen which tightens and constricts the heart allowing for the turtles to lower their metabolic rate and survive the winter buried under water.

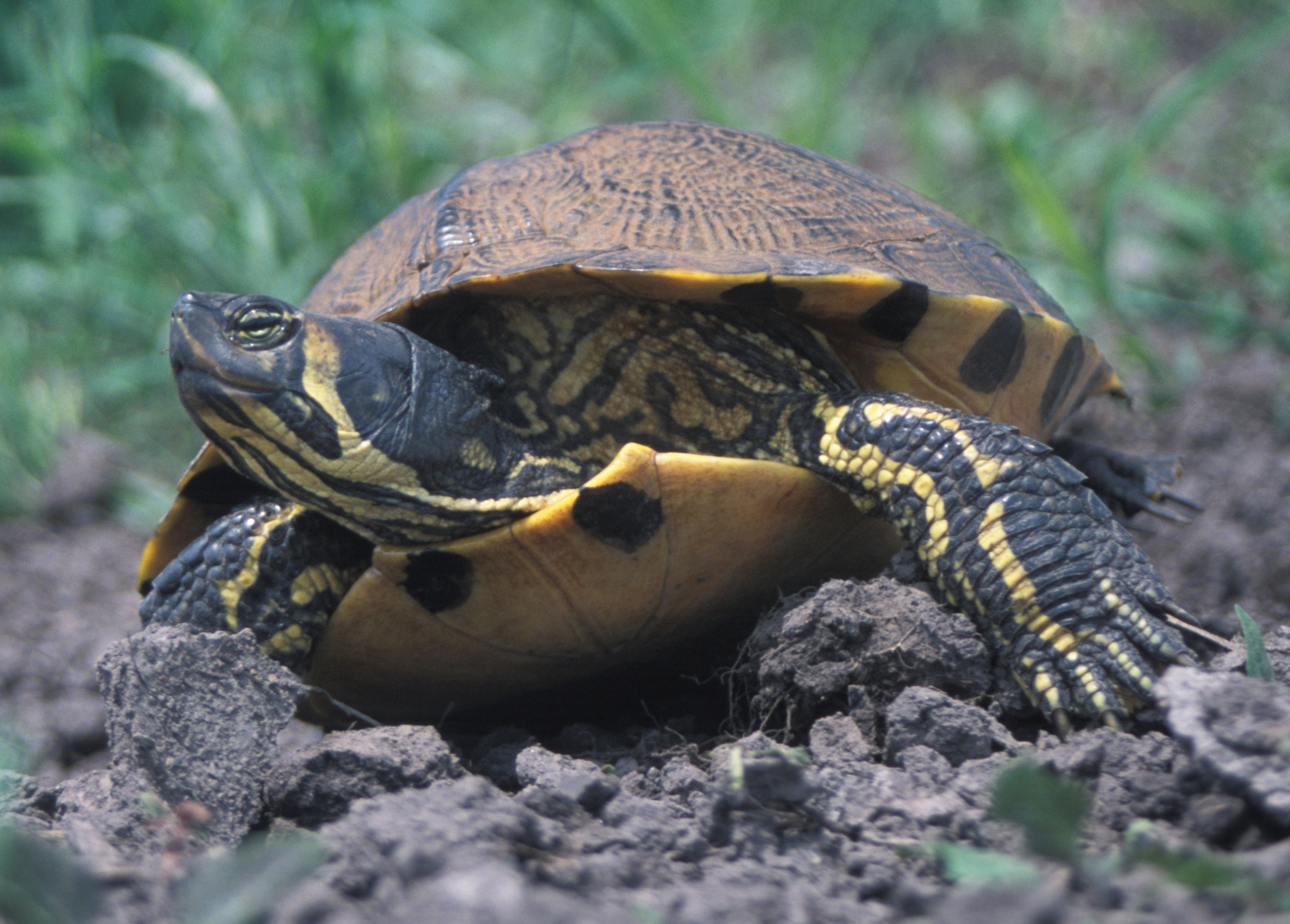
The yellow plastron with green spots is visible in this view.

== Distribution ==
Yellow-belly sliders range from southeastern Virginia, through the Carolinas, Georgia, northern Florida, and eastern Alabama. In European countries where pond sliders are established and invasive, that they can impose threats to native biodiversity through competitive advantage over native terrapins. They are often released into Europe from the pet trade, which makes them one of the top 100 invasive species outside of the United States. To try and contain them, scientists have been using environmental DNA, or traces of DNA left by T. scripta scripta in its habitat, to locate them and plan management strategies.

== Reproduction ==
Mating can occur in spring, summer, and autumn. They have polygynandrous mating behavior. Courtship consists of biting, foreclaw display, and chasing. Yellow-bellied sliders are capable of interbreeding with other T. scripta subspecies, such as red-eared sliders, which are commonly sold as pets. The release of non-native red-eared sliders into local environments caused the state of Florida to ban the sale of red-eared sliders in order to protect the native population of yellow-bellied sliders.

Mating takes place in the water. Suitable terrestrial area is required for egg-laying by nesting females, who will normally lay 6–10 eggs at a time, with larger females capable of bearing more. Studies have shown the turtles' suitable area criteria will not change even with significant anthropogenic change, meaning humans should be careful when modifying yellow-bellied slider habitats. The eggs incubate for 2–3 months and the hatchlings will usually stay with the nest through winter. Hatchlings are almost entirely carnivorous, feeding on insects, spiders, crustaceans, tadpoles, fish, and carrion. As they age, adults eat less and less meat, and up to 95% of their nutritional intake eventually comes from plants.

== Movement ==
Yellow-bellied slider movement is highly instigated by dry seasons, where they can be found traveling terrestrially to locate a new water source. One study also found movement is also highly motivated by reproductive recruitment. Differences between male and female movements were observed. Males were more active than females in spring to the end of autumn. Males also exhibited more terrestrial and aquatic movements than females. Finally, long periods of movements were exclusively males. Yellow-bellied sliders have exhibited a water finding ability. They are able to orient themselves in the direction of water even in unfamiliar landscapes. Manmade barriers like roads interfere with this ability and cause the migrating turtles to change directions.

== Feeding behavior ==
The slider is considered a diurnal turtle; it feeds mainly in the morning and frequently basks on shore, on logs, or while floating, during the rest of the day. At night, it sleeps on the bottom or on the surface near brush piles. Highest densities of sliders occur where algae blooms and aquatic macrophytes are abundant and are of the type that form dense mats at the surface, such as Myriophyllum spicatum and lily pads (Nymphaeaceae). Dense surface vegetation provides cover from predators and supports high densities of aquatic invertebrates and small vertebrates, which offer better foraging than open water.

Hatchlings are primarily carnivorous and feed on insects, spiders, crustaceans, and tadpoles. Adults prefer a more high-protein diet but can sustain a vegetative diet. Adult diets consist of leaves, stems, roots, fruits, larger invertebrates, small fish, tadpoles, and frogs. Studies suggest that younger turtles are carnivorous because animals are more nutrient dense and easier to digest than plant material. Adult turtles have a longer digestive tract and can ferment plant material to utilize all the nutrients. It is proposed that consuming some animals in addition to plant material increases the nutrient absorption when compared with a solely herbivorous diet.

== Predators ==
Some common predators of the yellow-bellied slider include raccoons, opossums, red foxes, and skunks. Other than predators, yellow-bellied sliders are susceptible to respiratory infections which can cause wheezing, drooling, or puffiness in the eyes and is commonly caused by bacteria. Additionally, these turtles can develop fungal spores that can lead to shell rot, they can also develop metabolic bone disease which can stunt the growth of their shells and cause them to be more brittle and prone to damage

== Lifespan ==
The lifespan of yellow-bellied sliders is over 30 years in the wild, and over 40 years in captivity.

Since yellow-bellied sliders are long-lived organisms, they require high survivorship to maintain stable populations. They are particularly susceptible to negative effects associated with anthropogenic habitat modification such as increased presence of human-subsidized predators and increased road mortality. Recruitment could also be decreased in populations in highly urbanized areas due to a decrease in habitat connectivity and potential nesting sites. Due to their long lifespan, yellow-bellied sliders are particularly vulnerable to pollution. Chemicals that build up in their environments build up in their bodies and cause negative health effects once the toxins reach a critical level.

== As pets ==
=== Housing ===
Young Trachemys scripta scripta swimming in a tank

Baby yellow-bellied sliders may be kept in a fairly small tank (20 to 40 gallons), but as they age, after about three years, they will require much more space. One adult may be housed in a 75 US gal (284 L) or larger aquarium. The turtles require enough water to turn around, with a depth of 16–18 in (41–46 cm) recommended. Water temperature should be kept between 72 and 80 °F (22 and 27 °C) and properly filtered. Keeping fish with turtles is usually avoided due to the risk that the turtle will eat the fish. Sliders need a basking area that is kept warm during the day and that will allow the turtle to move around, balance, and dry off completely. This area should average 89–95 °F (32–35 °C) and can be heated with a UV-A heat lamp. A second lamp that produces UV-B is absolutely essential for the turtle to metabolize calcium properly. Direct, unfiltered sunlight is preferable. The lamps should be switched on during daylight hours.

=== Diet ===
Pond plants such as elodea (anacharisan) and cabomba can also be left in the water, while human-consumed vegetables such as romaine lettuce, escarole and collard greens must be changed daily. As sliders are omnivores, insects and freshly killed fish may also be provided for protein. Commercially processed animal-based reptile food may be given too, but any sort of leftovers should be immediately removed to prevent fouling the water or turtle's habitat.

== Gallery ==
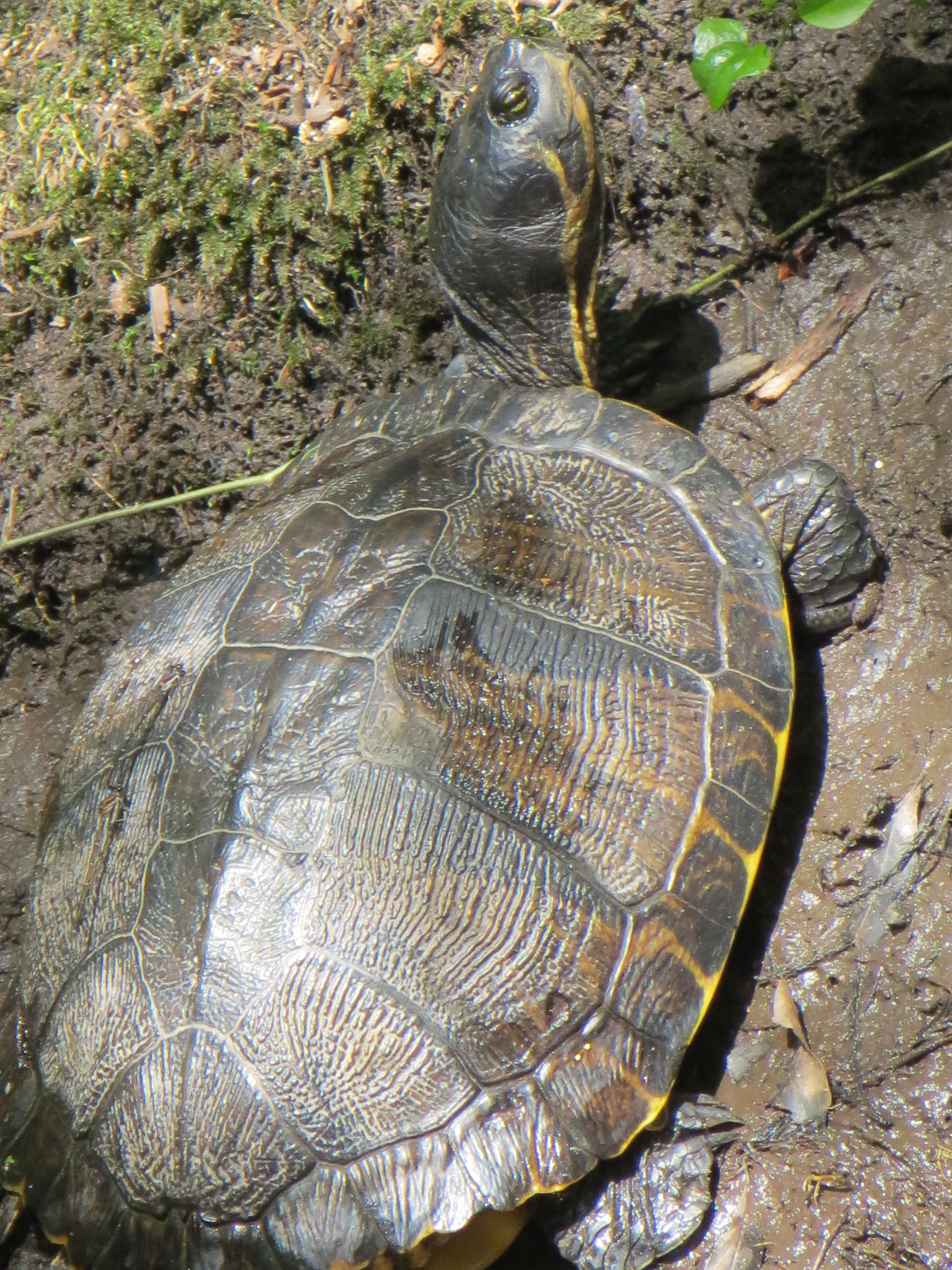
Trachemys scripta scripta in Francis Beidler Forest

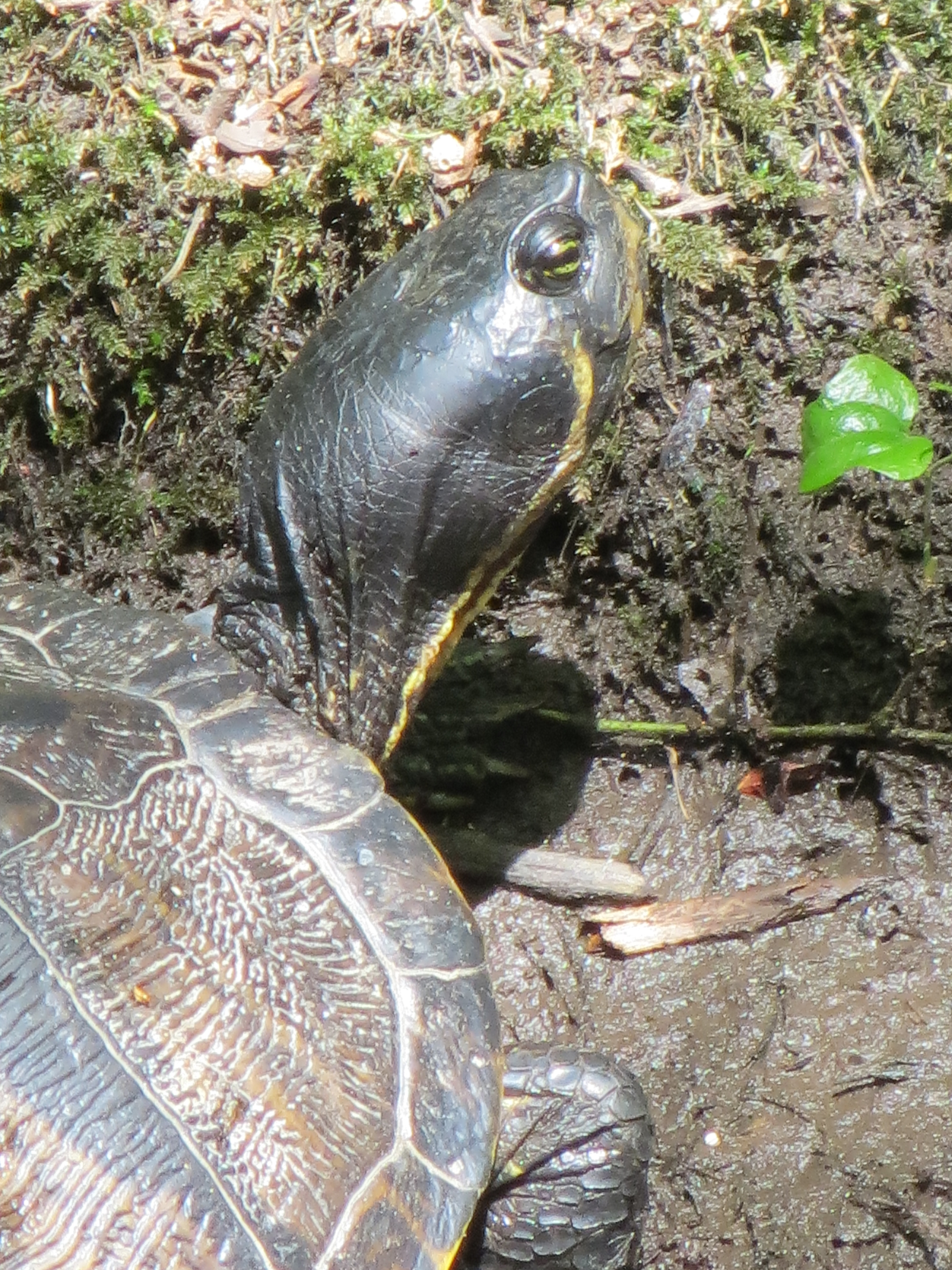
Detail of head

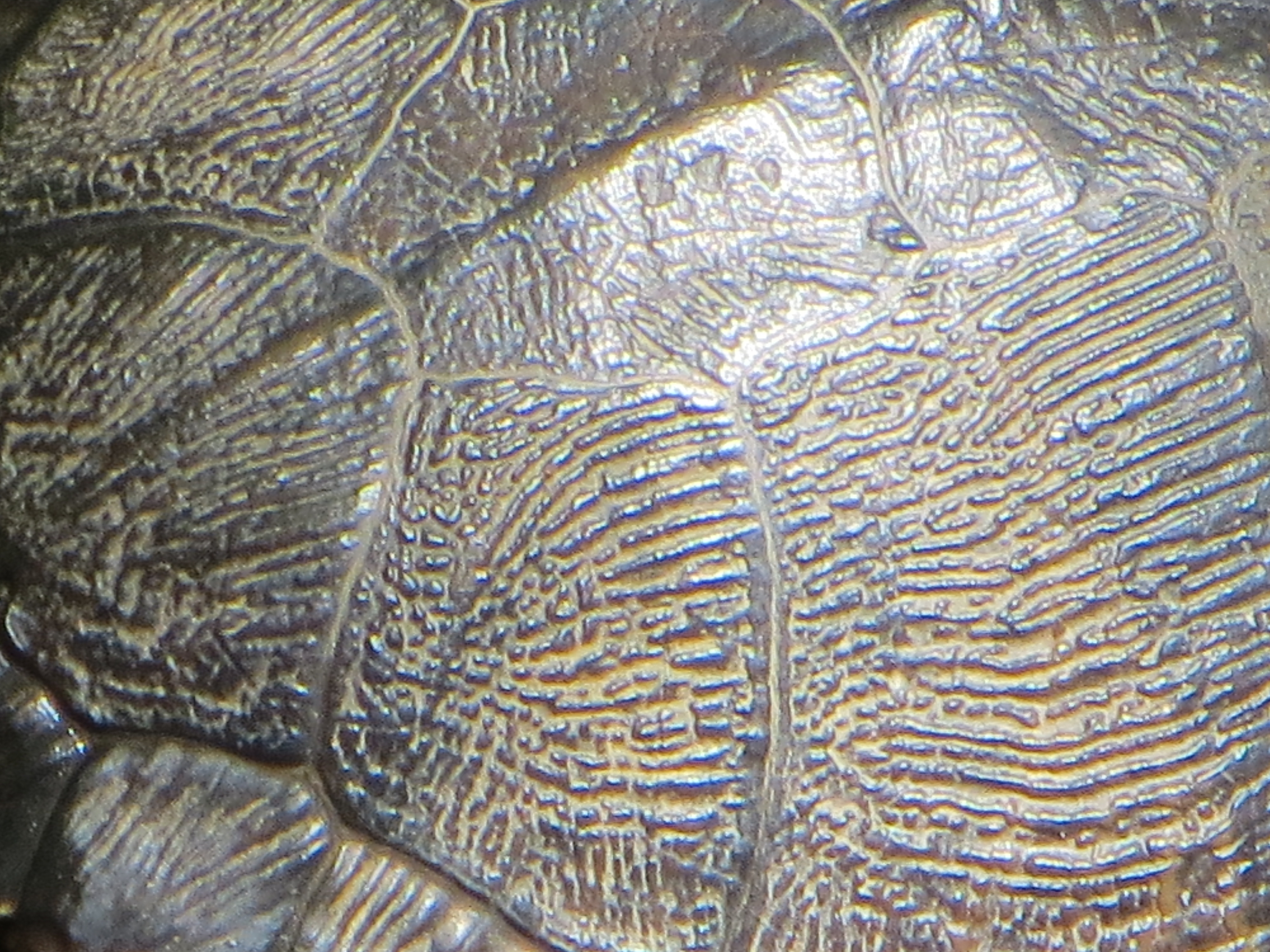
Detail of shell

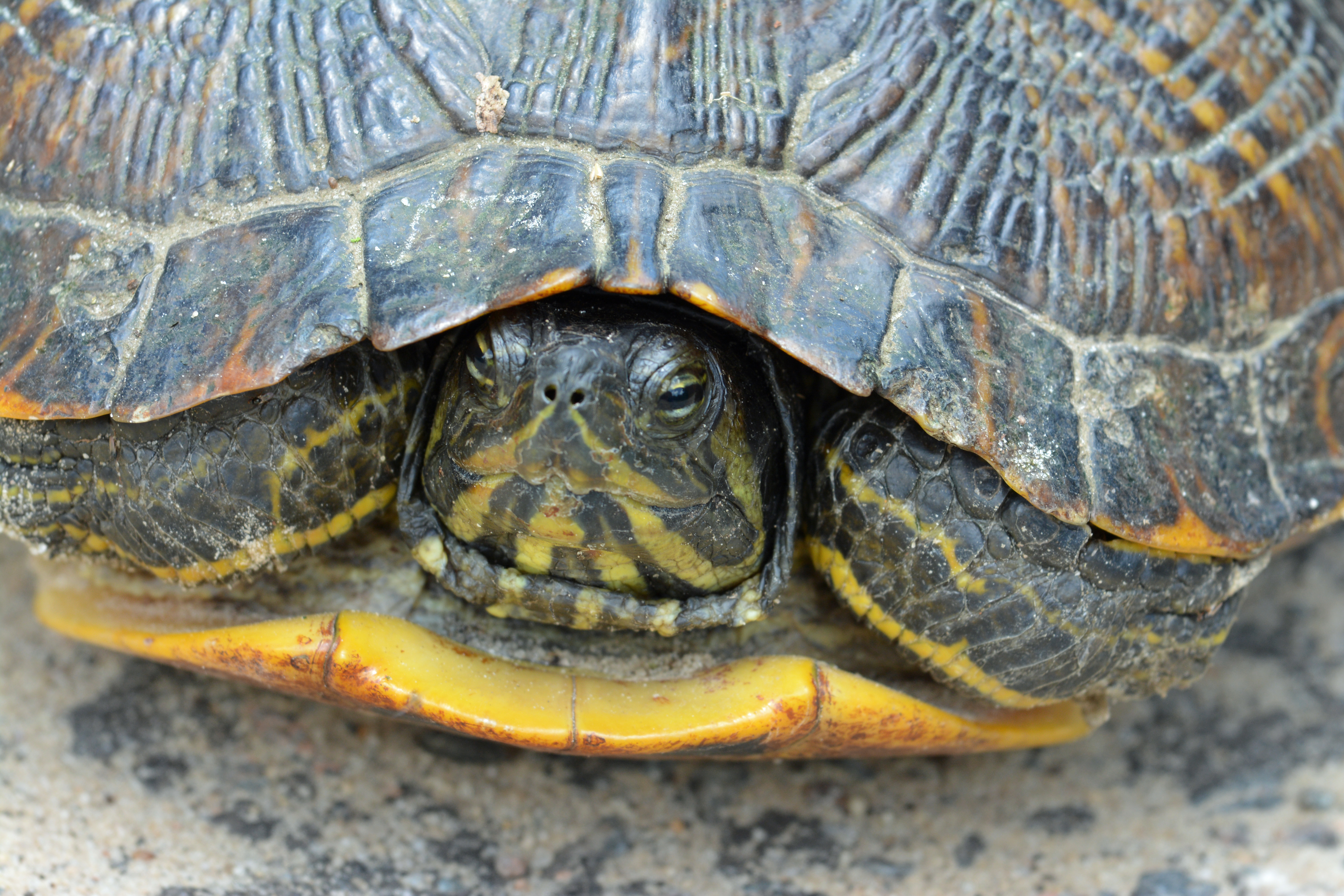
Face

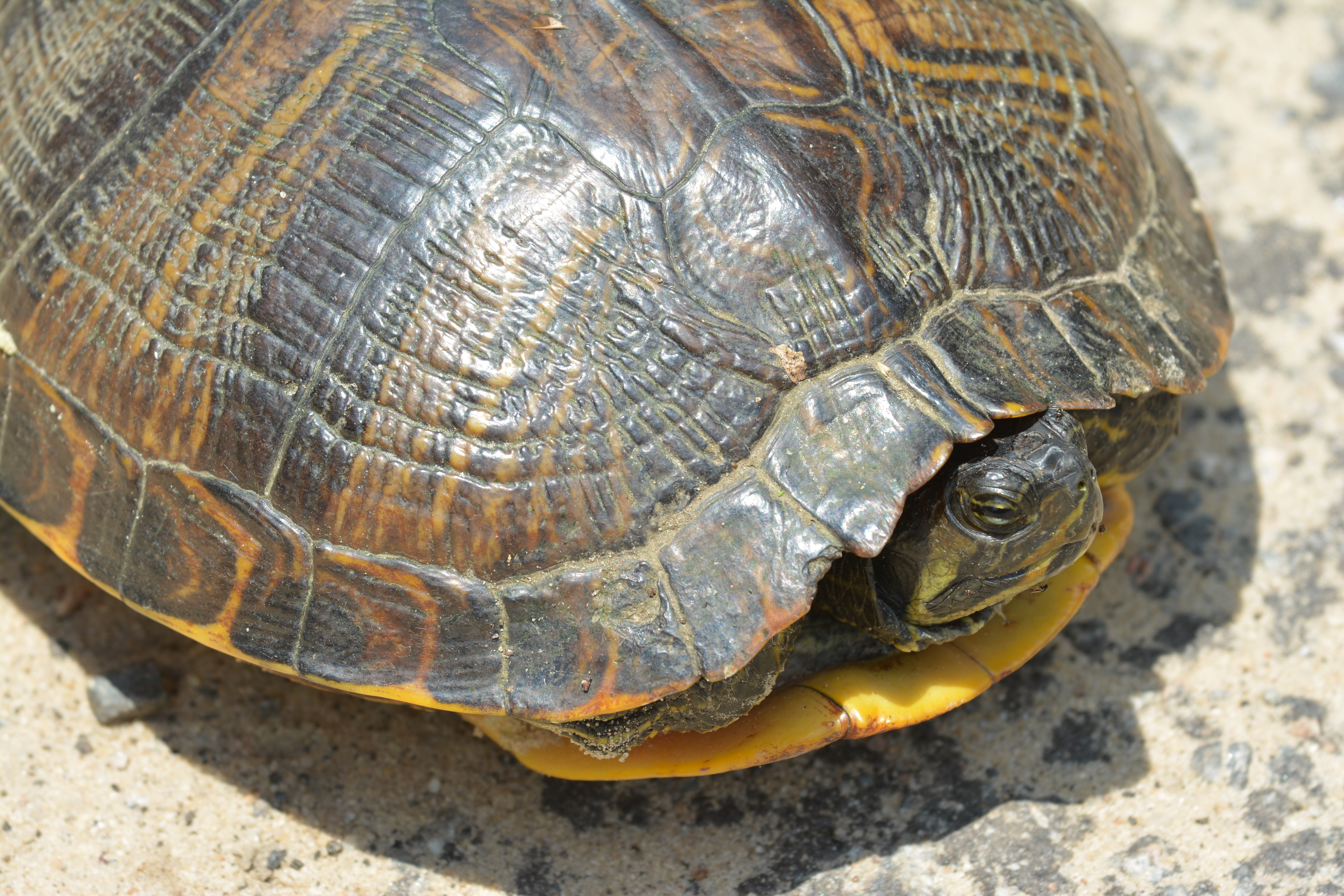
Upper part

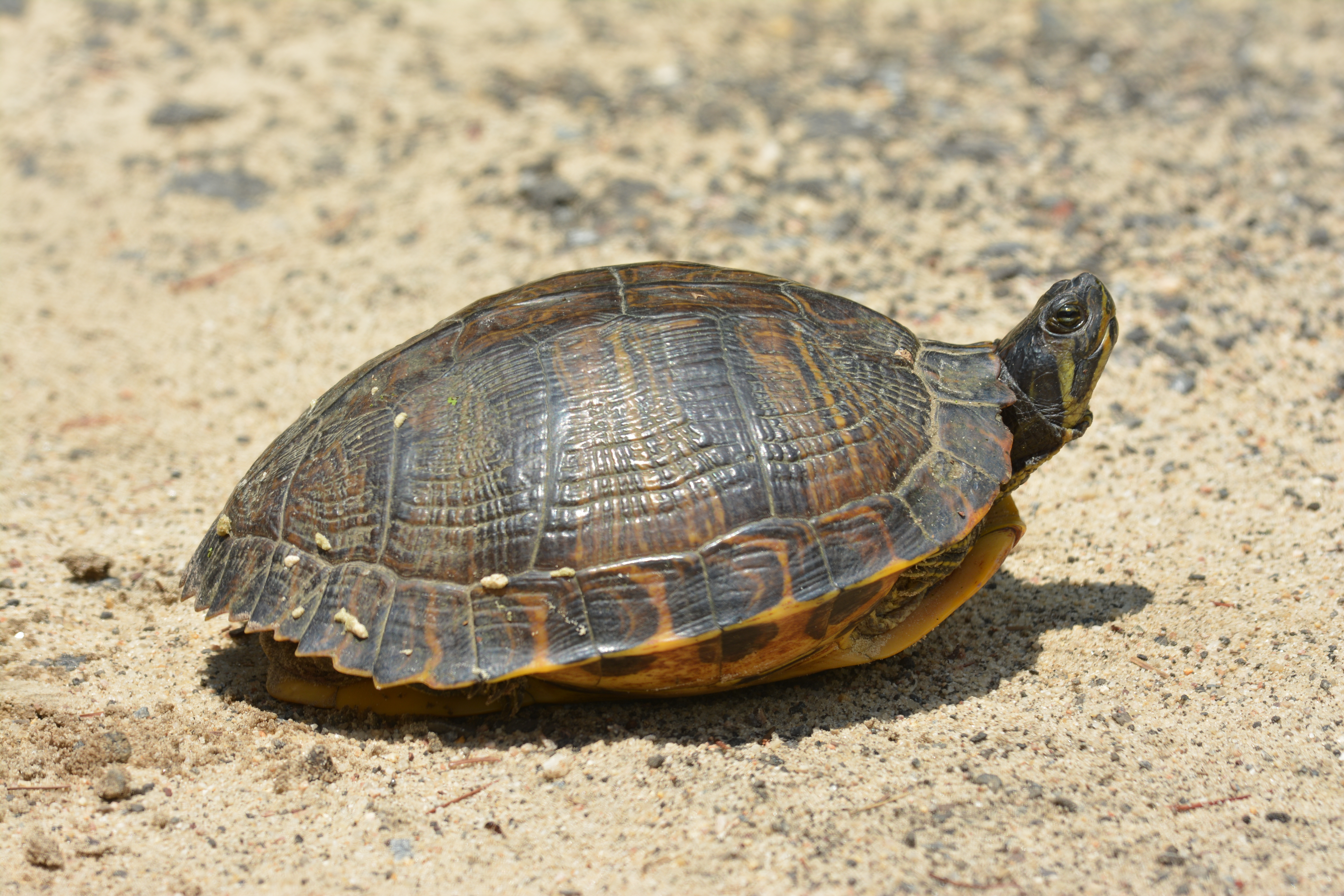
Side view

== See also ==
- Red-eared slider × yellow-bellied slider sometimes called yellow-eared slider
