= Cades Pond culture =

Archaeological culture in Florida, US

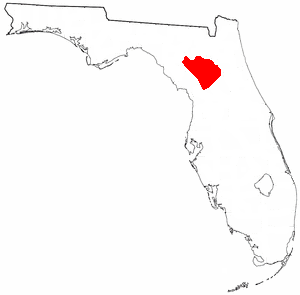
Approximate area of the Cades Pond culture region

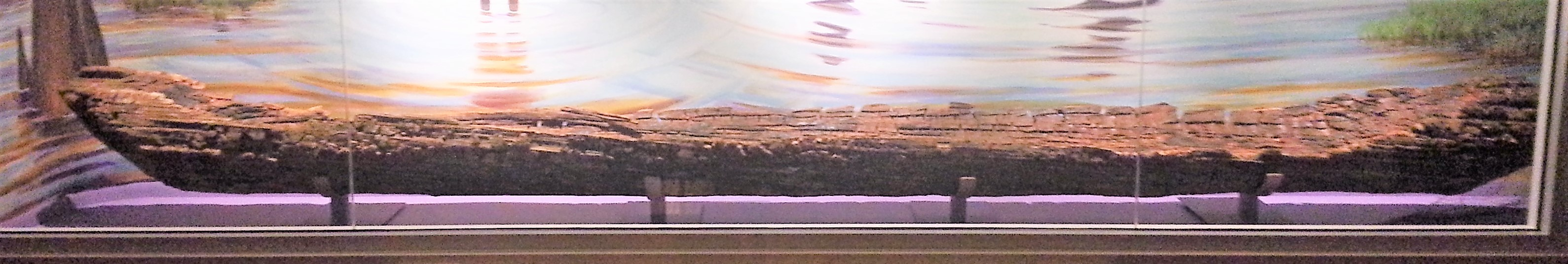
1,500-year-old Cades Pond dugout canoe on display in lobby of Matheson Museum

The Cades Pond culture is defined as a Middle Woodland Southeast period archaeological culture in north-central Florida, dating from around 100 to 600 CE.

== Location ==
The Cades Pond culture is found in an area roughly corresponding to present-day central and eastern Alachua County, northernmost Marion County, the southeastern corner of Bradford County, and western Putnam County. Cades Pond village sites are located within 2 kilometres (1.2 mi) of a major lake or river. Most known village sites are in clusters between large lakes. A couple of villages have been found along the Santa Fe River. Milanich identifies six clusters of villages and major mounds in the Cades Pond area: Paynes Prairie, between Paynes Prairie and Newnans Lake; Levy Lake, between the western end of Paynes Prairie and Levy Lake; Cross Creek, between Orange Lake and Lochloosa Lake (adjacent to Cross Creek); Natural Bridge, at the Natural Bridge on the Santa Fe River; and Santa Fe Lake, on the north side of Santa Fe Lake. He also declares it likely that there are two to four more clusters in western Putnam County. The name of the culture derives from the Cades Pond Mound, in southeastern Bradford County (the Santa Fe Lake cluster), which was excavated by Henry Gilman in the 1870s. The present definition of the Cades Pond culture was developed around 1970.

There may have been more than 50 mounds in Alachua County before agriculture and other development degraded or destroyed many of them. Most of those mounds were probably constructed by Cades Pond people. Villages and mounds usually occurred together. Villages that were ceremonial centers might also include one or more of additional mounds, cemeteries, other earthworks, and/or ponds. Some outlying hamlets might not have a mound. Villages appear to have been occupied for long periods, and included large storage pits.

== Sites ==
Mounds and village sites of the Cades Pond culture include the Running Lake Mounds (8AL182, 8AL183), near River Sink on the Santa Fe River, the Simmons Place (8AL188) near where Olustee Creek joins the Santa Fe River, the Cades Pond Mound and the Griner Mound (8BF8) northeast of Santa Fe Lake, the Prairie Creek Midden site between Paynes Prairie and Newnans Lake, the Shirea Site (8AL49, 8AL84) and the Melton Site (8AL5, 8AL7, 8AL169) on the north side of Paynes Prairie, the Ramsey Pasture Mound (8AL78) and Wacahoota Mound (8AL58) between the western end of Paynes Prairie and Levy Lake, the Cross Creek site (8AL2, 8AL3) between Orange Lake and Lochloosa Lake, the River Styx site (8AL458) north of Orange Lake, and mounds near Hawthorne (8AL464), and Evinston (8AL117).

== History ==
Prior to 100, people of the Deptford culture spent most of their time on the Gulf of Mexico coast with seasonal excursions to inland sites. Deptford people established permanent villages in the area of Alachua County around 100, as the Cades Pond culture developed out of the Deptford culture. Late Deptford sites on the Gulf coast close to the Cades Pond culture area built shell mounds. Horseshoe-shaped shell rings appeared in those sites starting in the first century CE. Several early Cades Pond sites, including River Styx, Ramsey Pasture and Cross Creek, had horseshoe shaped sand mounds or earthworks surrounding a central mound used for burials.

The River Styx site, the earliest known Cades Pond site, was a transitional site, with Deptford style ceramics resembling the Yent Complex, whereas Deptford ceramics have not been found at later Cades Pond sites. The River Styx site has been compared to the more elaborate Crystal River (Deptford and Santa Rosa-Swift Creek culture) and Fort Center (Belle Glade culture) sites. Almost all of the burials at the River Styx site were cremations, whereas cremations were rare at other Cades Pond sites. Occupation of the River Styx site extended from about 100 to about 200.

The somewhat later Cross Creek site is more elaborate than the River Styx site, with several mounds. It did not have any Deptford-style ceramics. A burial mound is surrounded by a horseshoe-shaped earthwork, as at the River Styx site, but does not contain any cremations. Other mounds at Cross Creek do not have associated earthworks around them.

The Ramsey Pasture Mound (8FL78) has a central mound surrounded by horseshoe-shaped earthwork, which presumably places it early in the development of the Cades Pond culture, but it has not been excavated and cannot be placed in sequence with other sites.

Weeden Island ceremonial pottery appeared in Cades Pond mounds around 300. Pottery found in Cades Pond villages and middens was largely undecorated, and resembled contemporary ceramics of the St. Johns culture. Cades Pond culture has been described as a Weeden Island culture, but St. Johns series pots always outnumbered Weeden Island pots in Cades Pond mounds, suggesting closer ties to the St. Johns culture area than to Weeden Island. The influence of Weeden Island culture on Cades Pond may have weakened by 500. Around 600 to 700 the Cades Pond culture was replaced by the Alachua culture. Wallis suggests that drought in north central Florida in 659 to 724 is related to replacement of the Cades Pond culture by the Alachua culture. The ritual and mounds of the Alachua culture were simpler than that of the Cades Pond culture. The subsistence patterns of the Alachua culture were oriented to upland areas, making little use of the wetlands that were so important to Cades Pond culture. Rolland offers three scenarios for consideration: (1) that the Alachua culture developed in place from Cades Pond, adopting pottery styles from inland cultures running up through Georgia and South Carolina into North Carolina, (2) that the predecessors of the Alachua culture moved into the area and coexisted with people of Cades Pond for a while (Cades Pond pottery may have remained in use in the area into the 9th or 10th century), eventually absorbing the Cades Pond people, or (3) the Cades Pond people left the area or otherwise disappeared before the people of the Alachua culture moved into the area.

== Culture ==
The Cades Pond culture is distinguished by its pottery and stone tools, and by the siting of its villages. Pottery found at Cades Pond sites consists primarily of large, undecorated bowls. Stone tools include hafted knives and scraping tools, perforators, triangular knives, manos and metates and sandstone abraders. Bone tools include double-pointed leisters, splinter awls, perforators, flakers, deer ulna awls, scrapers or fleshers, punches, and fids. Shell columella (the central column of a conch or whelk shell, often used as a hammer) and tools with shark's teeth have also been found.

The Cades Pond people heavily exploited the aquatic resources of their environment. A large midden at the Melton site on the north side of Paynes Prairie provided evidence for most of what is known of Cades Pond subsistence. Eighty-five percent of the 1500 individual animals used for food at one site came from aquatic habitats. Included were snails, clams, 12 species of fish, frogs, 7 species of turtles, 5 species of water snakes, alligator, 7 species of water birds, otter, and muskrat. Land animals consumed included deer, black bear, panther, opossum, rabbits, squirrel, skunk, rats, and foxes. Identified plant remains include hickory (especially mockernut hickory), pine nuts, acorns, Chickasaw plum, persimmon, and wild cherry (Carolina cherry laurel). There is no evidence that the Cades Pond people cultivated any crops. Ceramics at the site suggest that food was commonly boiled or otherwise cooked with water. There were few grinding implements found, but wooden grinding tools are unlikely to have survived conditions at the site.

Pottery of St. Johns Plain and Dunns Creek Red types indicate trade with or influence from cultures of the St Johns River valley. Evidence of trade with cultures of the Gulf, and possibly, Atlantic, coasts, includes the presence of remains of several types of shark, sea turtles, mullet and marine mollusks. Wider trade networks are shown by the presence of objects made from slate, greenstone and copper, deposits of which are not found in Florida.

There is no archaeological evidence of cultivation and consumption of maize in the Cades Pond culture. However, analysis of bone collagen and apatite that has been performed on skeletons from the early (200-400) Cades Pond Cross Creek and late (600-800) Cades Pond Melton I mounds suggests that C4 plants, presumably maize, were increasing as a part of the diet of Cades Pond people from the early period to the late period.
