= Hornsby Spring =

Spring in Alachua County, Florida, USA

Coordinates: 29°50′59″N 82°35′36″W

Topographical map of the area around Hornsby Spring

Hornsby Spring is located in northwestern Alachua County, Florida near the Santa Fe River, 2.4 kilometres (1.5 mi) north of the city of High Springs. A karst spring, Hornsby Spring was historically a first-magnitude spring, but with reduced and variable flow since the 1970s, it is now classified as a second-magnitude spring. The spring was used for many years for recreation by a church camp, but periods of little or no flow combined with nutrient pollution and low levels of dissolved oxygen have resulted in algal blooms, rendering the spring unfit for human use.

== Description ==
Hornsby Spring is located 2.4 kilometres (1.5 mi) north of the city of High Springs, in Camp Kulaqua, a 240-hectare (600-acre) facility owned by the Florida Conference of the Seventh-day Adventist Church. The pool of Hornsby Spring was described in 1977 as being elongated, 56 metres (185 ft) long east to west, and 38 metres (125 ft) wide north to south. In 1972, the water entering the spring was 22.5 °C (72.5 °F), clean, and clear, with a slight brown color (the water was a faint greenish-blue in 2002). The flow from the vent was 7.1 cubic metres (250 cu ft) per second, well above the 2,800 litres (100 cu ft) per second defining a first-magnitude spring.

In 2012, the pool was described as being nearly circular, 45 metres (147 ft) across east to west and 47 metres (155 ft) north to south. The main vent (the opening through which the spring flows) is 10.5 metres (34 ft) beneath the surface, under a limestone ledge that is 4.9 metres (16 ft) deep. The vent connects eastward into a system of caves. A secondary vent is 5 metres (16 ft) beneath the surface. The elevation of the pool surface is 10 metres (33 ft) above sea level. The pool averages 2 metres (6 ft 7 in) deep.

Hornsby Spring sits in a floodplain surrounded by cypress, gum, and maple trees. The ground to the north, east, and south rises steeply to about 1.8 metres (6 ft) above the spring pool, and then gradually to about 4.6 metres (15 ft) above the pool. The upland habitat is rolling sandhills.

The Hornsby Spring Run leaves the pool heading west towards the Santa Fe River, 1.5 kilometres (0.93 mi) away. It initially passes through a floodplain swamp to a swallet 275 metres (902 ft) downstream, which captures part of the flow in the run. It then flows 650 metres (2,130 ft) through a wide swamp to Treehouse Swallet, which captures most, if not all of the remaining flow in the run. During heavy flow in the run, some of the water may bypass the swallet, flowing above ground directly to the Santa Fe River. In the 1930s, a ditch was dug from Treehouse Swallet to Darby Spring (Note: Darby Spring is a small spring next to the Santa Fe River, about 2.9 kilometres (1.8 mi) north of High Springs. It flows into the river through a 46 metres (150 ft) run. Freshwater deposits above the current waterline of the spring's pool indicate that the spring had a strong flow in the past, but in 2002 it was inactive, and the pool was heavily vegetated.) on the banks of the Santa Fe River. The water that enters the swallets flows underground to Treehouse Spring (Note: Treehouse Spring is part of the Hornsby Spring system. It is a 1st magnitude spring and has been designated an Outstanding Florida Spring by the state. It has been rated as "not impaired". The spring has two vents. One vent is the re-emergence of Hornsby Spring Run fed by Treehouse Swallet. The second vent is part of the Santa Fe River Rise system, where the river re-surfaces after entering a sinkhole at O'Leno State Park. The flow from the vents varies depending on the intake at the swallets.) on the banks of the Santa Fe, 240 metres (800 ft) from Treehouse Swallet.

== History ==
The Seventh-day Adventist Church bought the 240-hectare (600-acre) tract that includes Hornsby Spring in 1953. With some 50,000 visitors a year, the spring was used intensively for swimming and paddling for many years. As the flow from the spring reduced and became unreliable, and nutrients from above ground sources entered the groundwater feeding the spring, algae grew in the pool and it was periodically declared unfit for human use. The church spent $1.6 million to construct a water park in the camp to replace the recreational use of the spring.

Hornsby Spring was a first-magnitude spring in the mid-20th century, but its flow began varying in the 1970s. On April 19, 1972, the flow was measured at 7.1 cubic metres (250 cu ft) per second. Three years later, on April 25, 1975, the flow was 2.2 cubic metres (76 cu ft) per second. The spring has stopped flowing several times since then, including during a drought from 1998 to 2001 and a drought in early 2012. If the Santa Fe River floods when there is little or no flow from the spring, the flood waters can reverse the flow of the spring. The flow from Hornsby Spring has been measured 112 times between 1971 and 2020. The average flow from the spring was 2.5 cubic metres (90 cu ft) per second from 1971 to 2017, with the highest recorded flow at 10.0 cubic metres (352 cu ft) per second. Zero flow was recorded ten times, while a negative flow was recorded three times, up to 0.51 cubic metres (18 cu ft) per second into the spring vent.

== Pollution ==
Hornsby Spring is hypoxic, with dissolved oxygen levels between 0.16 milligrams per litre (mg/L) and 0.50 mg/L in the outflow from the vent. Agricultural and urban development in the springshed (the area of groundwater recharge that feeds the spring) has increased the nutrients passing through the groundwater into the spring. That development has also resulted in increased withdrawal of groundwater, reducing the flow into the spring. Droughts also have periodically reduced the flow into the spring. The combination of factors has resulted in a proliferation of algae in the spring, which now heavily covers the spring pool, including the previously bare sand around the vents. Hornsby Spring has been classified as impaired.

A primary focus area (PFA) (Note: A primary focus area is "the area of a basin where the Floridan aquifer is generally most vulnerable to pollutant inputs and where there is a known connectivity between groundwater pathways and an Outstanding Florida Spring".) of 20,049 hectares (49,542 acres) has been designated for Hornsby Spring. Within that PFA, 60% of the nitrogen entering the groundwater is from field fertilizer and another 12% is from livestock waste. The PFA also includes parts of the cities of High Springs and Alachua, with urban sources of pollution. The Alachua County Environmental Protection Department has undertaken a "Habitat Restoration through Aeration and Revegetation" project to remove algae and restore healthy aquatic vegetation in the spring, and to reduce fertilizer use in the springshed through an educational campaign.

== Biota ==
Aquatic plants in the spring include the filamentous algae water felt (Vaucheria species) and the cyanobacteria Lyngbya wollei. Vascular plants in the pool include common salvinia (Salvinia minima), common water hyacinth (Pontederia crassipes), floating pennywort (Hydrocotyle spp.), naiad (Najas guadalupensis), pickerel weed (Pontederia cordata), spade-leaf sword (Aquarius cordifolius), springtape {Sagittaria kurziana), and red ludwigia (Ludwigia repens).

The water emerging from the spring vent has a low level of dissolved oxygen, less than 0.5 milligrams per litre, which will not generally sustain fish populations. The dissolved oxygen level is generally higher near the surface of the pool, and eastern mosquitofish (Gambusia holbrooki), golden shiners (Notemigonus crysoleucas), and minnows, species that typically stay near the surface, are commonly observed. Other fish observed in the pool include bluegill (Lepomis macrochirus), bowfin (Amia calva), hogchoker (Trinectes maculatus), lake chubsucker (Erimyzon sucetta), redbreast sunfish (Lepomis auritus), redear sunfish (Lepomis microlophus), spotted sunfish (Lepomis punctatus), and Suwannee bass (Micropterus notius). The invasive sailfin catfish (Pterygoplichthys spp.), which can gulp air to obtain oxygen, has also been found in the pool.

Invertebrates found in the spring pool include spring crayfish (Procambarus spiculifer), Florida apple snail (Pomacea paludosa), and banded mystery snail (Viviparus georgianus). The Santa Fe River watershed, including Hornsby Spring, is a diversity hotspot for freshwater turtles. Eleven species of turtles are found in the spring pool, including: chicken turtle (Deirochelys reticularia), common snapping turtle (Chelydra serpentina), eastern musk or stinkpot turtle (Sternotherus odoratus), Florida red-bellied cooter (Pseudemys nelsoni), Florida softshell turtle (Apalone ferox), loggerhead musk turtle (Sternotherus minor), peninsula cooter (Pseudemys peninsularis), pool slider (Trachemys scripta), striped mud turtle (Kinosternon baurii), Suwannee alligator snapping turtle (Macrochelys suwanniensis), and Suwannee cooter (Pseudemys concinna suwanniensis). Small (less than 2 metres (6 ft 7 in) long) alligators (Alligator mississippiensis) also occur in the pool. Following a drought in 2012, musk turtles disappeared from Hornsby Spring for years, possibly because raccoons could more easily catch turtles in very low water, and largely eliminated the population in the spring.

== Sources ==
- Johnston, Gerald; Mitchell, Joseph; Suarez, Eric; Morris, Tom; Shemitz, Georgia; Butt, Peter; Knight, Robert (December 7, 2016). "The Santa Fe River in northern Florida: effect of habitat heterogeneity on turtle populations". Bulletin of the Florida Museum of Natural History. 54 (5): 69–103. doi:10.58782/flmnh.xcex4207. ISSN 2373-9991.
- Nico, Leo G.; Butt, Peter L.; Johnston, Gerald R.; Jelks, Howard L.; Kail, Matthew; Walsh, Stephen J. (2012). "Discovery of South American suckermouth armored catfishes (Loricariidae, Pterygoplichthys spp.) in the Santa Fe River drainage, Suwannee River basin, USA" (PDF). BioInvasions Records. 1 (3): 179–200. Bibcode:2012BioIR...1..179N. doi:10.3391/bir.2012.1.3.04.
- Pittman, Craig (January 23, 2014). "Florida's vanishing springs". Tampa Bay Times. St. Petersburg, Florida.
- Rosenau, Jack C.; Faulkner, Glen L.; Hendry, Charles W., Jr.; Hull, Robert L. (1977). Springs of Florida. Tallahassee, Florida: Florida Department of Natural Resources.
- Schnabel, Rose (2026-03-12). "In the Santa Fe River, generations don wetsuits to study a global hotspot of turtle diversity". WUFT-TV. Gainesville, Florida.
- Scott, Thomas M.; Means, Guy H.; Means, Ryan C.; Meegan, Rebecca P. (2002). First Magnitude Springs of Florida. Tallahassee, Florida: Florida Geological Survey.
- "Outstanding Florida Springs – Hornsby Spring". Florida Springs Institute.
- "Outstanding Florida Springs – Treehouse Spring". Florida Springs Institute.
- HSW Engineering (January 2021). Minimum flows and minimum water levels re-evaluation for the lower Santa Fe and Ichetucknee rivers and priority springs (Report). Live Oak, Florida: Suwannee River Water Management District.
- Santa Fe River Basin Management Action Plan (PDF) (Report). Tallahassee: Florida Department of Environmental Protection. June 2018.
- Santa Fe River and Springs environmental analysis: Phase 3 – Final report: Environmental data (PDF) (Report). High Springs,Florida: The Howard T. Odum Florida Springs Institute. December 2020.
- "Darby Spring". Visit Florida Springs.
- "About Us – Christian Retreat and Conference Center – North Florida". Camp Kulaqua.
