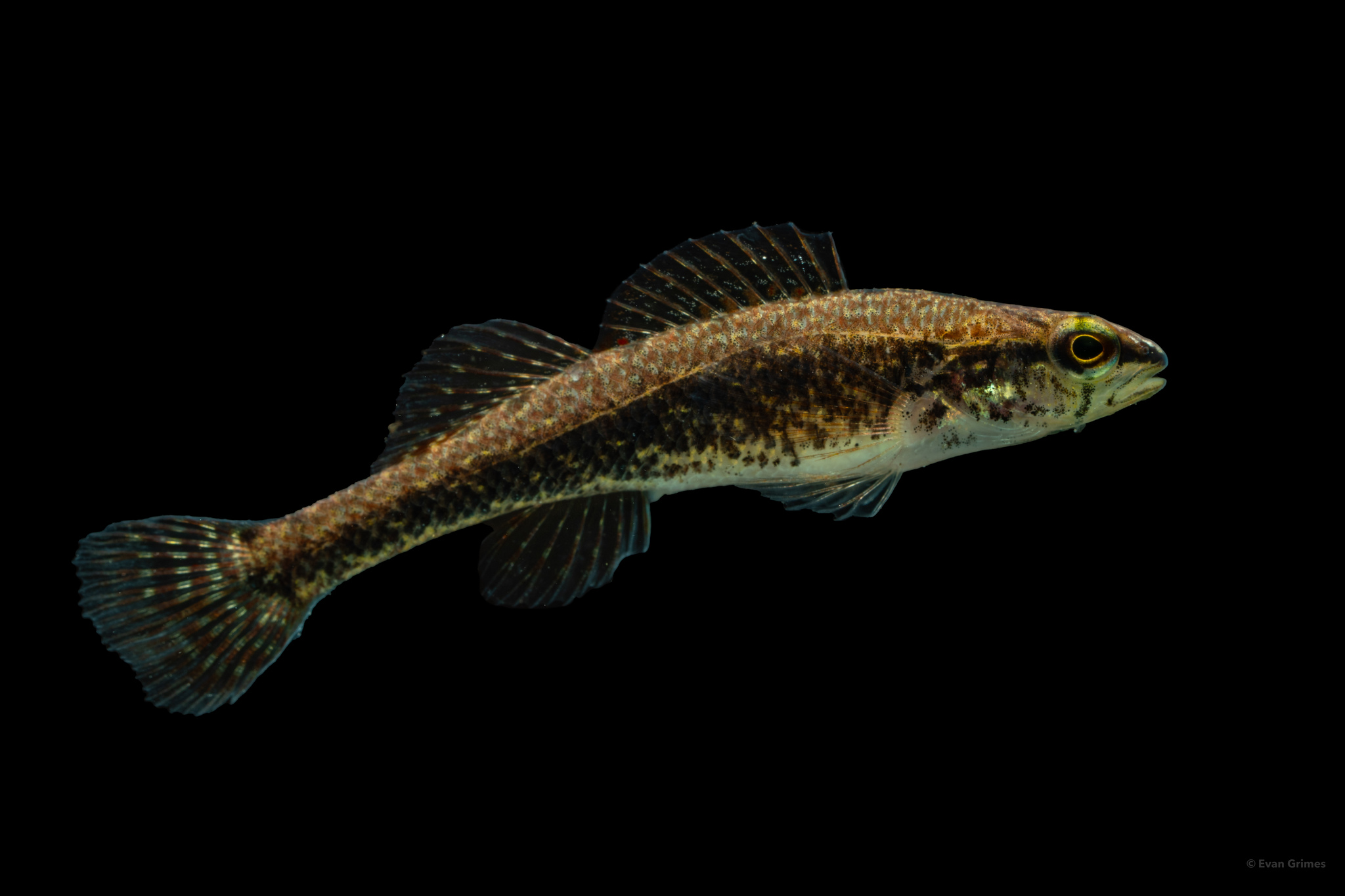

Conservation status
- Least Concern (IUCN 3.1)

Scientific classification
- Kingdom: Animalia
- Phylum: Chordata
- Class: Actinopterygii
- Order: Perciformes
- Family: Percidae
- Genus: Etheostoma
- Species: E. edwini

Binomial name
- Etheostoma edwini (Hubbs & Cannon, 1935)

Synonyms
- Villora edwini Hubbs & Cannon, 1935

= Brown darter =

Species of fish

The brown darter (Etheostoma edwini) is a species of freshwater ray-finned fish, a darter from the subfamily Etheostomatinae, part of the family Percidae, which also contains the perches, ruffes and pikeperches. It is endemic to the eastern United States, where it occurs from the St. Johns River drainage of Florida to the Perdido River drainage of Alabama. It inhabits sandy runs, especially near vegetation, of creeks and small rivers. This species can reach a length of 5.3 cm (2.1 in). The brown darter was first formally described as Villora edwini in 1935 by Carl Leavitt Hubbs and Mott Dwight Cannon with the type locality given as the Santa Fe River at Poe Springs in Florida. The specific name honours the American zoologist Edwin Phillip Creaser (1907–1981) who was the collector of the type and who brought Hubbs's attention to this and other species.
