= Bellamy Road =

Improved 19th century road in Florida, USA

Coordinates: 29.901943°N 82.58383°W

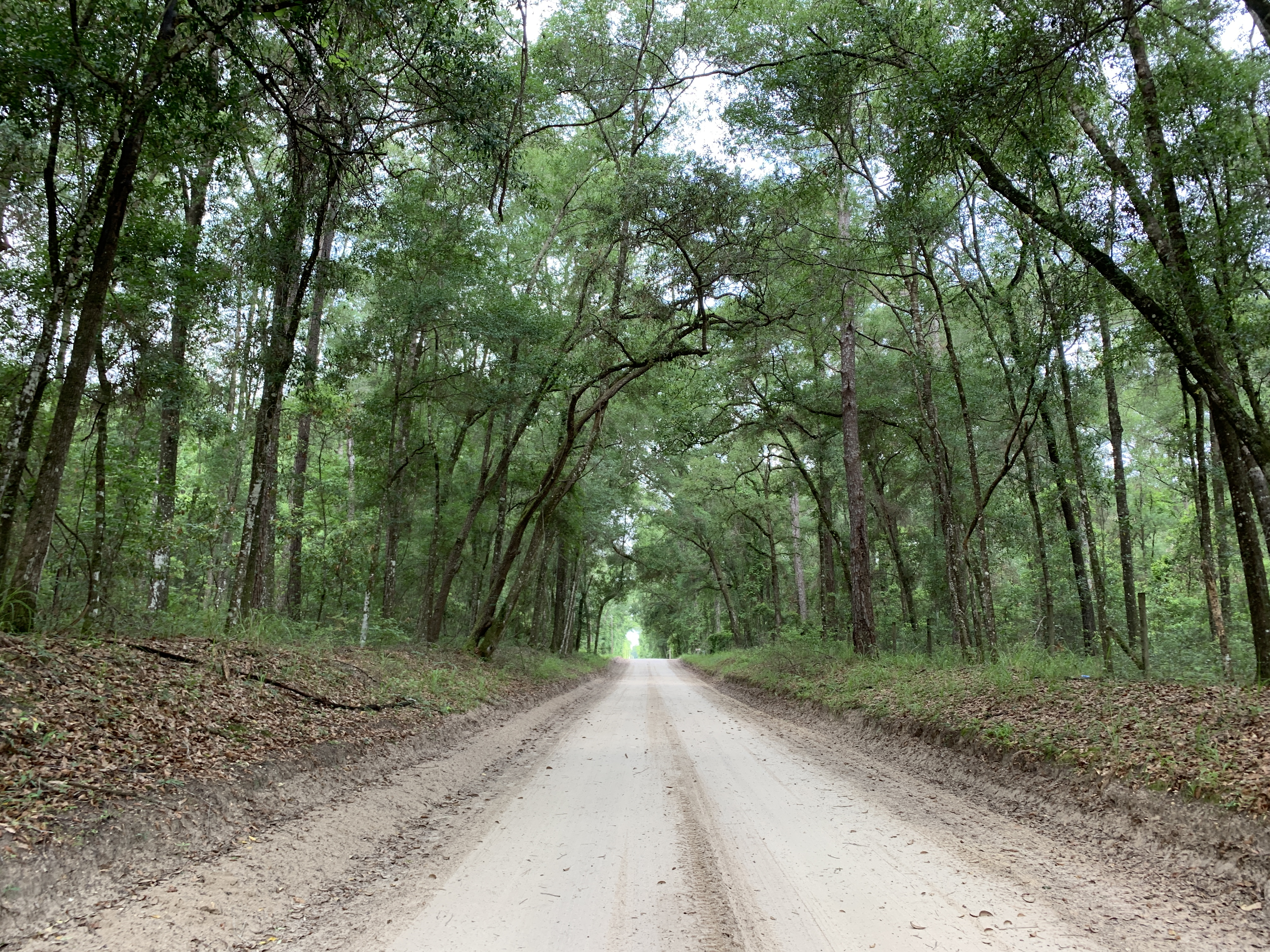
Old Bellamy Road, May 2020

The Bellamy Road was the first major U.S. federal highway in early territorial Florida. It was completed in 1826. Laborers included slaves. It was preceded by El Camino Real.

== History ==
Land travel and transportation in Florida prior to its acquisition by the United States was by foot over trails. The Spanish used existing Native American trails to reach missions established in the interior of Florida. The main route from St. Augustine to the Apalachee Province was known as el Camino Real, the Royal Road. In the latter part of the 17th century the Spanish tried, with limited success, to improve the Royal Road to allow use by ox carts.

In 1824, three years after Florida became a United States territory, the United States Congress authorized the construction of a road connecting Pensacola to St. Augustine. The law specified crossing points for the Choctawhatchee River, Econfina Creek (using the natural bridge there) and the Apalachicola River. From Tallahassee the road was to follow the old Spanish Road (Camino Real) to St. Augustine, crossing the St. Johns River at Picolata. Congress authorized US$20,000 for the project. The Army, which was responsible for constructing the road, solicited proposals to build the eastern portion of the road. John Bellamy of Monticello, with the endorsement of Florida Territorial Governor William Duval, offered to construct the road between the Ochlockonee River and St. Augustine for US$13,500. The Army contracted with Bellamy, and the Ochlockonee River to St. Augustine section became known as Bellamy's (or Bellamy) Road.

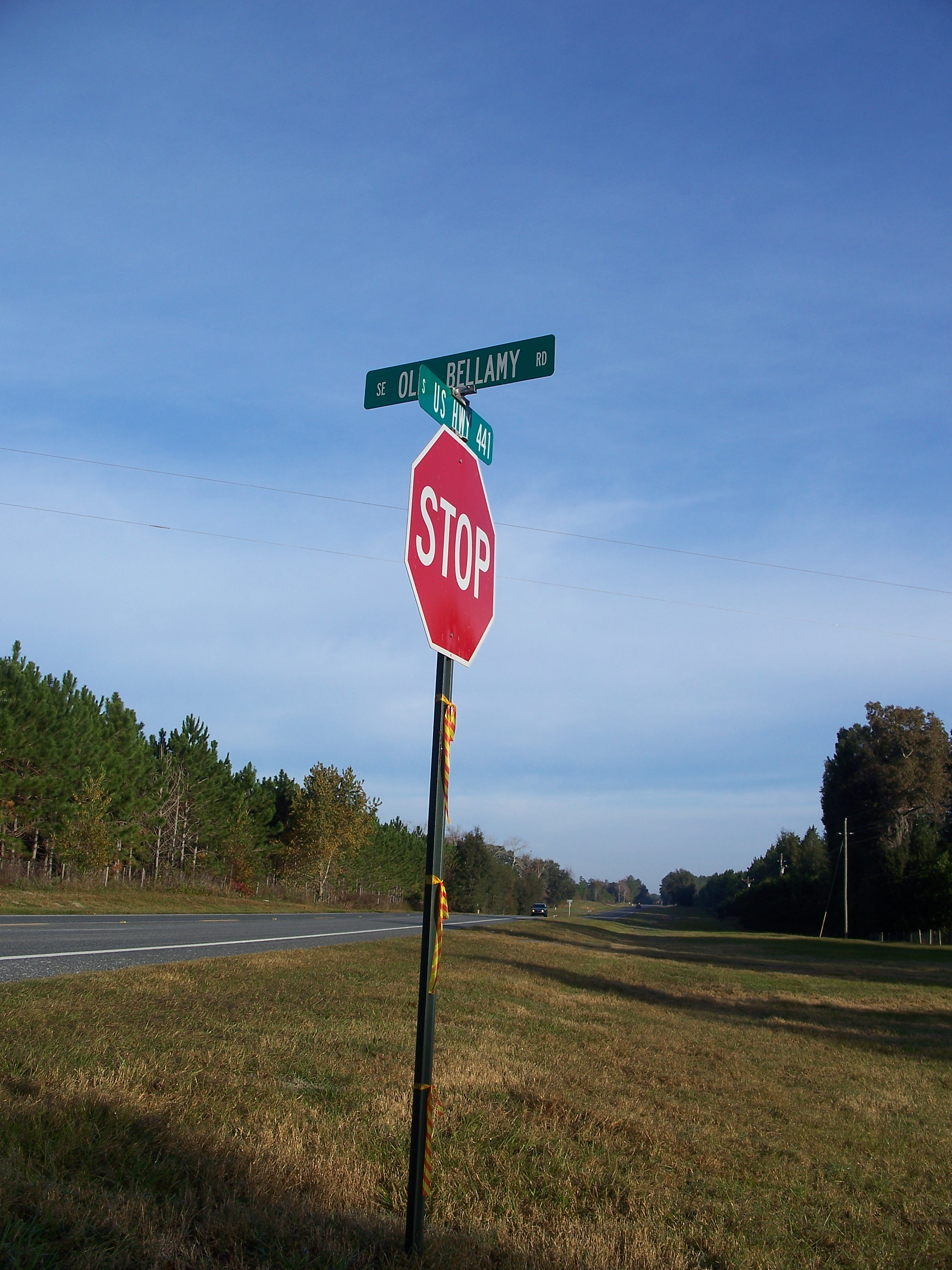
Street name sign for the former Bellamy Road at the intersection of US 41/441 south of O'Leno State Park.

Bellamy built the road using equipment and slaves from his plantation, and completed his portion of the road in 1826. The congressional act stated that the road was to be 25 feet (7.6 m) wide, but the contract with Bellamy required that the road only be 16 feet (4.9 m) wide. Tree stumps were to cut as close to the ground as possible, in order to clear a wagon's axles. Travelers quickly complained that the road was not always wide enough to let two wagons pass, that the bridges were inadequate, and that some stumps ("stump knockers") were too tall, jolting passengers and breaking axles.

The Bellamy Road followed the general route of the Spanish Royal Road (el Camino Real) or Old Mission Trail, used by Native Americans and Spanish missionaries, running from Mission San Luis de Apalachee near Tallahassee to St. Augustine. It headed eastward through present-day Jefferson County, and then crossed the Aucilla River by ferry into Madison County. The road continued eastward most of the way across Madison County until close to the Suwannee River, turning south into Lafayette County. The road crossed the Suwannee River by ferry into Suwannee County and ran southward close to the Suwannee River. It then passed into Columbia County, running past the Fig Springs mission site on the Ichetucknee River and entering Alachua County using the natural bridge of the Santa Fe River at O'Leno State Park. The road continued across northern Alachua County to near Lake Santa Fe. From there, the route of Bellamy Road forms the current boundary between the northwest part of Putnam County and the southwest part of Clay County. The road then crossed southeast Clay County, crossed the St. Johns River at Picolata, and continued through St. Johns County to St. Augustine.

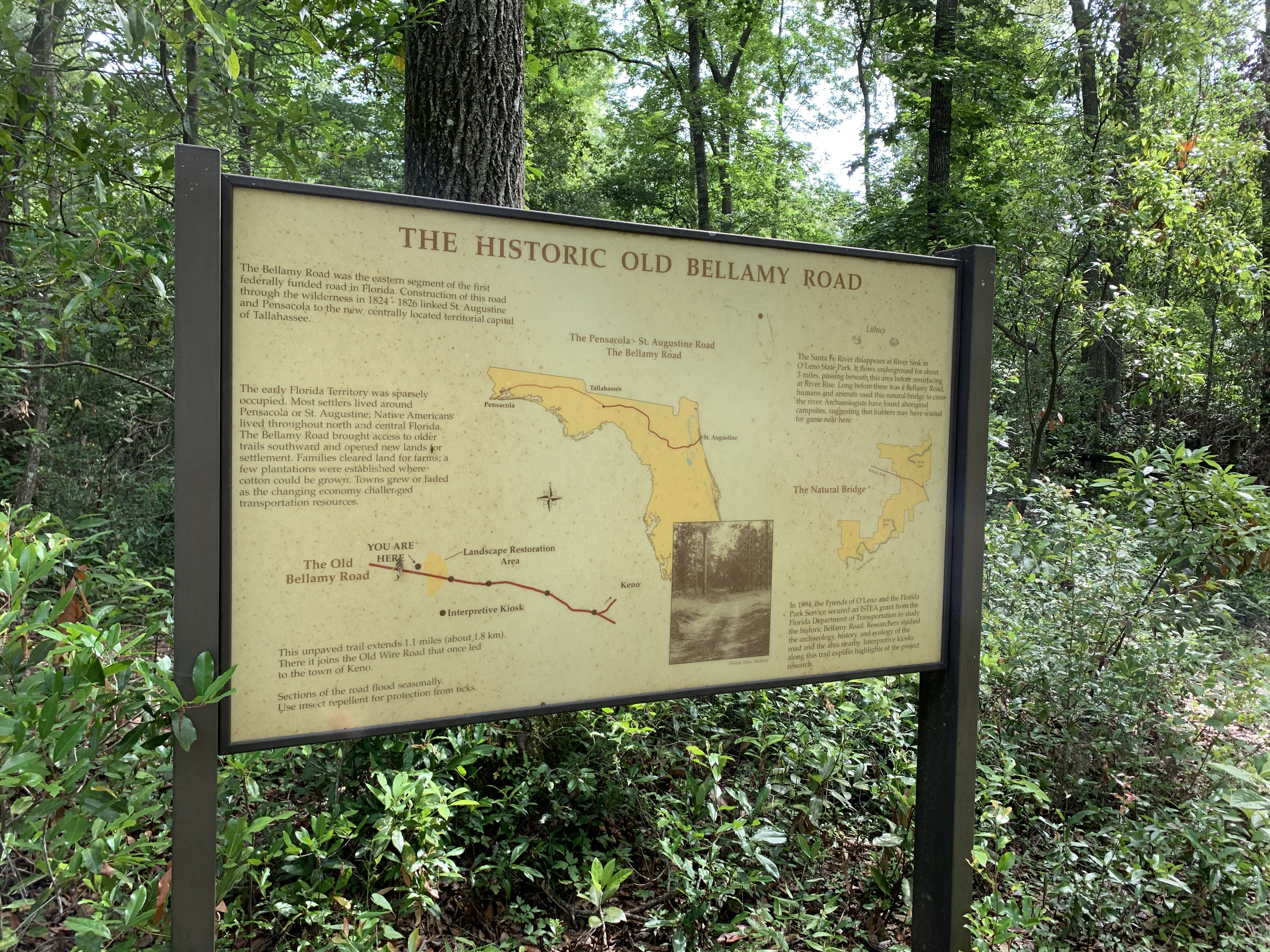
Informational sign

Neil Coker, a former enslaved person who was interviewed by the WPA, described the Bellamy Road and its history, including stating that Mr. Bellamy exploited it as a toll road.

In 1979, the road was designated as a Florida Historic Civil Engineering Landmark by the American Society of Civil Engineers.

== See also ==
- First American Road in Florida
