= Santa Fe Swamp =

Coordinates: 29°49′06″N 82°05′46″W

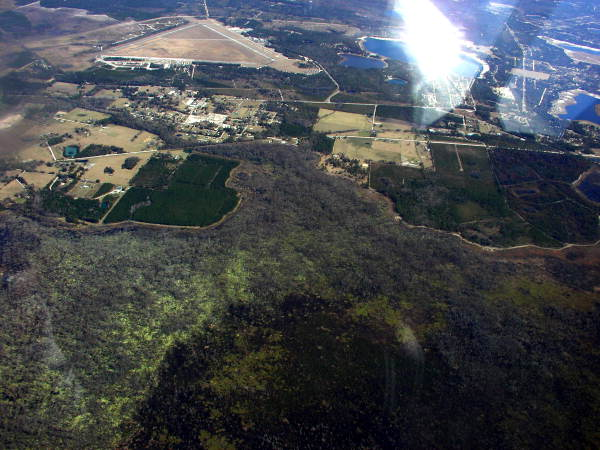
Aerial view looking east towards the airport in Keystone Heights, Florida. The Santa Fe Swamp Conservation Area is at the bottom and SR 100 in the middle of the image.

The Santa Fe Swamp is 95-percent floodplain 7,046-acre (2,851 ha) swamp. Along with Lake Santa Fe and Little Lake Santa Fe, it serves as headwaters of the Santa Fe River, which drains into the Suwannee River and then finally the Gulf of Mexico. It is located to the north of those lakes in Bradford County and Alachua County in Florida.

== Santa Fe Swamp Wildlife and Environmental Area ==
The 5,356-acre (2,167 ha) Santa Fe Swamp Wildlife and Environmental Area (WEA) was donated to the Suwannee River Water Management District in 1984 by Georgia-Pacific Corporation. At that time, it was the largest and most environmentally significant donation in the state of Florida's history. Allowable uses are wildlife viewing, hunting, bicycling, hiking, and horseback riding on administrative roads.
