= River Rise Preserve State Park =

Florida state park

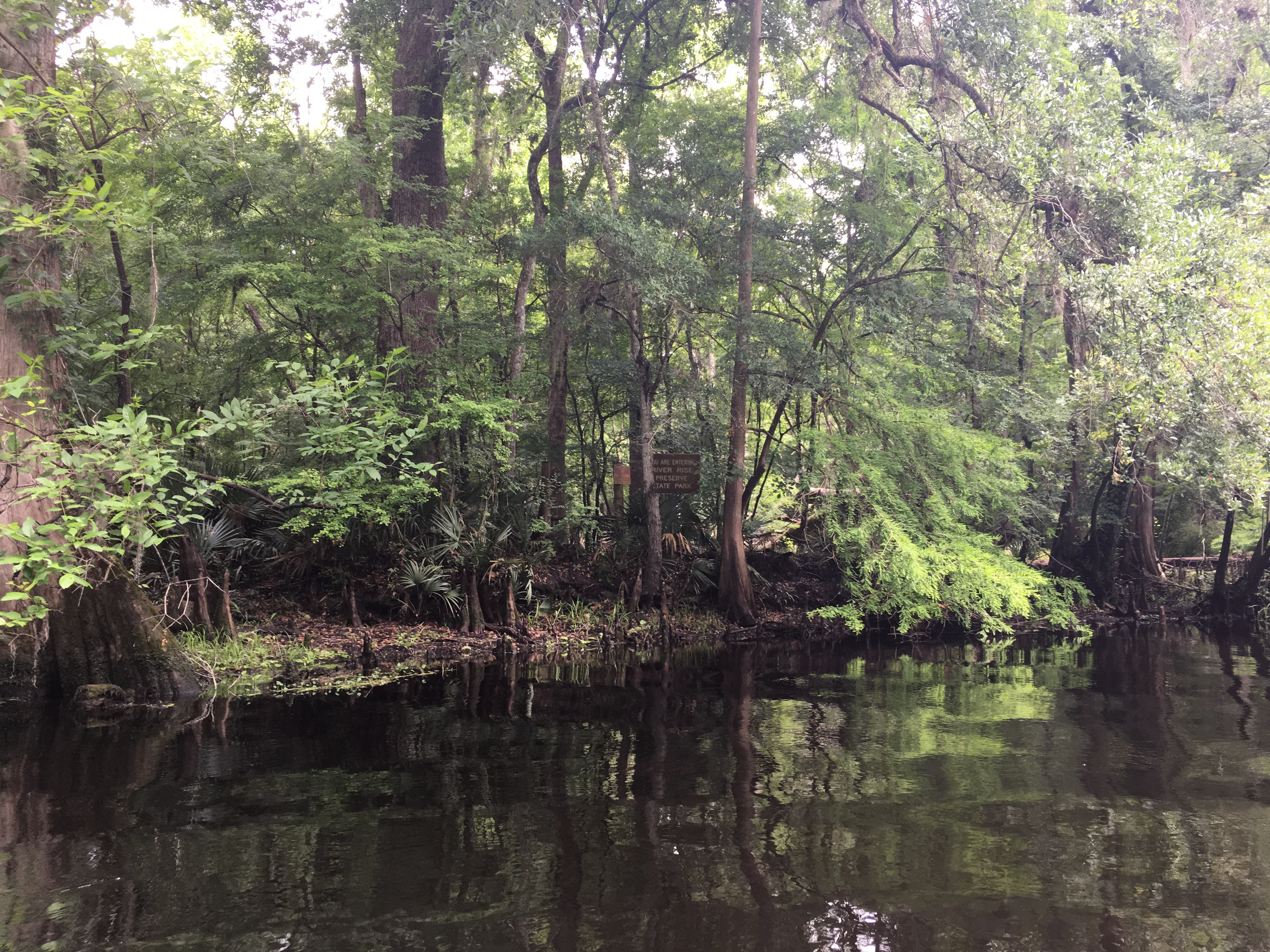
- River Rise Preserve State Park, April 2019

- Location within Florida Location within the United States
- Interactive map of River Rise Preserve State Park
- Location: Columbia County, Florida, USA
- Nearest city: High Springs, Florida
- Coordinates: 29°51′36″N 82°36′19″W
- Area: 1,800 hectares (4,500 acres)
- Governing body: Florida Department of Environmental Protection

River Rise Preserve State Park is a Florida state park, located six miles north of High Springs, off U.S. Route 441. Its name derives from it being where the Santa Fe River comes to the surface after having traveled underground for some distance beneath adjacent O'Leno State Park, one of Florida's original state parks. River Rise Preserve State Park took shape in 1974 when 1,800 hectares (4,500 acres) were acquired by the state for it.

The natural land bridge over the Santa Fe River where it travels underground for three miles serves as an important corridor for indigenous tribes, for the Spanish who incorporated it into their Mission Trail also known as El Camino Real, and for early American Florida that utilized the same crossing as part of the Bellamy Road.

== Recreation ==
The park has multi-use trails for hiking, cycling and horseback riding. Its primitive equestrian campground includes a 20-stall horse barn and restrooms with showers.

== Links ==
- River Rise Preserve State Park at Florida State Parks
