= River Styx archaeological site =

Archaeological site in Florida, US

River Styx
- Interactive map of River Styx
- 29.518°N 82.221°W
- Type: settlement, tumulus
- Periods: Woodland period
- Cultures: Cades Pond
- Location: Alachua County, Florida, US

History
- Built: c. 100 CE
- Abandoned: c. 200 CE

Site notes
- Material: sand
- Elevation: 18 m (59 ft)
- Height: 3 feet (0.91 m)
- Length: earthworks: 190 feet (58 m)
- Width: earthworks: 140 feet (43 m)
- Excavation dates: 1971, 1972
- Archaeologists: Ripley P. Bullen
- Discovered: 1970
- Condition: badly disturbed

Designations
- Designation: 8AL458

The River Styx archaeological site is the site of a village and burial mound in North Central Florida that was occupied during the development of the Cades Pond culture out of the Deptford culture early in the Current Era (CE).

Prior to 100, people of the Deptford culture who lived along the northern half of the Gulf of Mexico coast of the Florida peninsula, known as the Big Bend Coast, spent most of their time near the coast with seasonal excursions to inland sites. People of the Deptford culture established permanent villages in the area of central and eastern Alachua and western Putnam counties starting around 100, where the Cades Pond culture developed out of the Deptford culture. Late Deptford sites on the Gulf coast built shell mounds. Horseshoe-shaped shell rings appeared in Deptford sites along the Big Bend Coast starting in the first century CE. Several early Cades Pond sites, including River Styx, Ramsey Pasture and Cross Creek, had horseshoe shaped sand mounds or earthworks resembling the shell rings, with the added feature of a central mound used for burials. ,

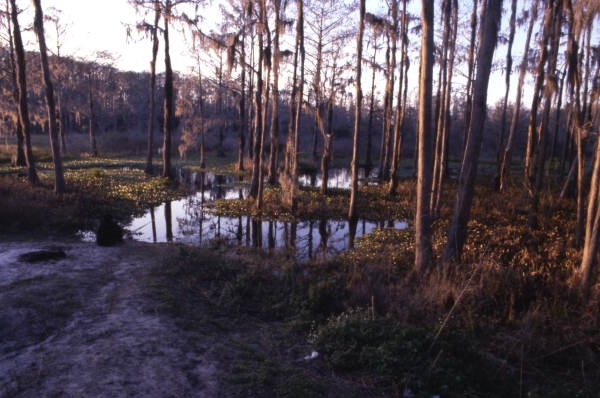
The River Styx Swamp near Cross Creek in Alachua County, Florida

The River Styx site is located beside the River Styx, which drains a swamp into the northwest end of Orange Lake. The site was examined by archaeologists in 1971–72. The site was then part of a pine plantation, which had been bulldozed in preparation for planting pines, and had been looted by collectors before archaeologists found out about it. When examined by archaeologists, the site included a mound that was about 3 feet (0.91 m) high in the middle and 60 feet (18 m) in diameter. A horseshoe-shaped earthwork surrounded the mound on three sides, and was open to the west. The earthwork was 330 feet (100 m) across on the east–west axis and 240 feet (73 m) on the north–south axis. A small pond, which may have been a borrow pit for the mound and earthwork, was located at the west (open) end of the earthwork. A village site on the north side of the pond was surveyed, but not excavated. The mound had several layers of different-colored sand, with a lot of charcoal mixed in the bottom layer.

There may have been up to 80 burials in the mound and the level area between the mound and the surrounding earthwork, but only 42 graves, all but one in the mound, were recorded. All of the burials were of bones from cremations which had been conducted elsewhere. Charred wood in the burial mound yielded a radiocarbon date of 55 to 428 CE, which made the River Styx Mound, as of 2014, the oldest known burial mound in North Central Florida. Various artifacts were found in the burial mound. Chert flakes, sandstone objects and pottery sherds were common. A handful of graves included chert hand axes, copper beads, and a copper sheet. Other objects in the burial mound that were not associated with any particular grave included a soapstone smoking pipe, a piece of another soapstone object, more copper beads and a couple of sheets of copper. Analysis of one of the copper beads indicates that the copper came from the Great Lakes region. The archaeologists were able to partially reconstruct 24 vessels using more than 1,000 sherds found in the mound.

The River Styx site, the earliest known Cades Pond site, was a transitional site. Most of the pottery found at the River Styx site has been classified as Deptford series, including ceramics resembling the Yent Complex. A smaller, but significant portion of the pottery at the site has been classified as St. Johns series. (The St. Johns culture occupied the St. Johns River valley and adjacent Atlantic coast of Florida east of the Cades Pond culture.) Analysis of the clay and temper used in pottery at the River Styx site indicates that the most common pots were Deptford series items made local to the site. The fairly common St. Johns series pots point to origins in northeast Florida. Some pots may be Deptford series from the Atlantic coast. Still other pots may have come from the southern Appalachian Mountains. Deptford ceramics have not been found at later Cades Pond sites. The River Styx site has been compared to the more elaborate Crystal River (Deptford and Santa Rosa-Swift Creek culture) and Fort Center (Belle Glade culture) sites elsewhere in Florida. All of the burials at the River Styx site were cremations, whereas cremations were rare at other Cades Pond sites and at Deptford sites on the Big Bend Coast. Occupation of the River Styx site was limited to the period of about 100 CE to about 200 CE.
