= Ginnie Springs =

Spring in Florida used for water sports

- Park
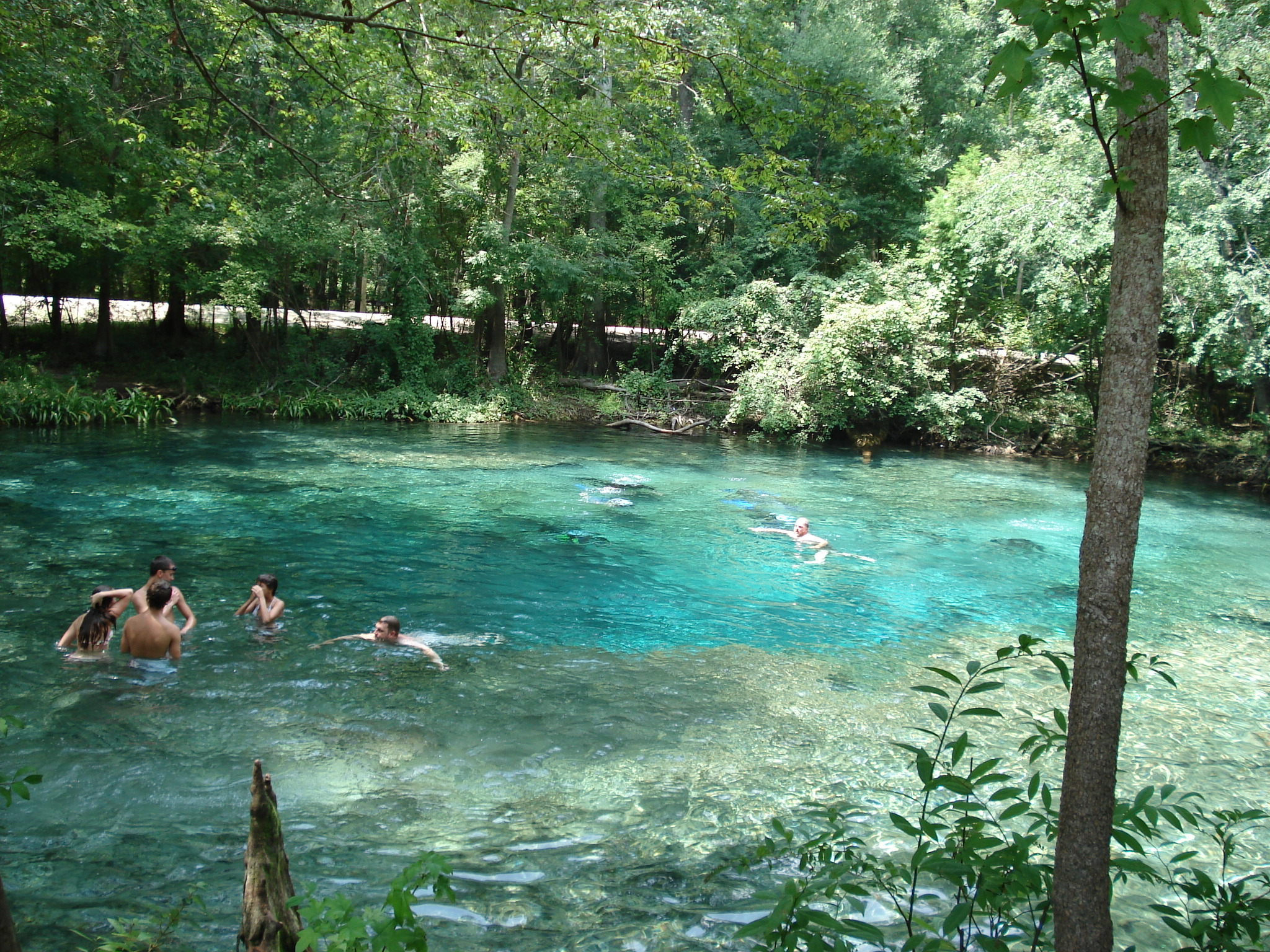

- Location within Florida
- Coordinates: 29.836°N 82.700°W

Ginnie Springs is a privately owned park in Gilchrist County about 6.5 miles (10.5 km) northwest of High Springs, Florida, USA. It is located on the south side of the Santa Fe River, to which it is connected. According to the Springs Eternal Project, the Santa Fe River and the springs attached are categorized as an "Outstanding Florida Waterway" by the Florida Department of Environmental Protection (FLDEP), meaning that, following the law, the rivers must receive water quality protection. This designation highlights the ecological importance of the area and emphasizes the need for careful management to preserve its natural conditions.

The size of the spring pool itself is about 90 feet in diameter, and about 12 feet deep. This makes it large enough for visitors to swim comfortably and explore the open water area. The spring outflow, however, is about 35 feet wide, and about 3 feet deep. It continuously flows for about 500 feet before it reaches the river floodplain. Continuing, an environmental analysis report from 2021 reports that the average flow for Ginnie Springs was about 40 cubic feet per second from 1995 to 2019. Such a steady flow is typical of many Florida springs and helps to maintain the clear, moving water that the area is known for. The water is clear and cold and there are accessible caverns with a sand and limestone bottom.

Ginnie Springs has been privately owned by the Wray family since 1971 and began functioning in 1976. In the mid-1990s when scuba diving grew in popularity, Bob Wray opened the springs to the public. Due to the increasing number of scuba diver deaths, Wray took precautions by putting in an iron grate over the most dangerous part of the cave, in the Ginnie Ballroom cavern, and placing warning signs for divers in the entrances to the nearby Devil's Spring system. The popularity of Ginnie took off and it became a nationally renowned diving spot which is still largely popular today.

Today in addition to diving, customers can swim, snorkel, canoe, kayak, stand up paddleboard, and tube along the Santa Fe River. Along the river, there are various springs travelers can enter and swim in. This is a source for bottled spring water. Due to the crystal-clear water of the spring, it is easy to view wildlife as well as wreaths underneath.

Since Ginnie Springs was privately owned by the Wray family, the bottling permit belonged to them for over 25 years. They sold the spring's water to many companies, including Coca Cola. In 2021, the Suwannee River Water Management District Governing Board approved a permit that granted Nestle permission to take over 1.1 million gallons daily from the aquifer that feeds Ginnie and other nearby springs to expand its bottled-water operations. This has sparked outcry. Environmentalists objected to the granting of the permit on the basis that it will continue the degradation of the state's natural springs and rivers, among other objections, such as risking minimum flow levels, ecological harm to the land and river, and exacerbating already-stressed springs. These concerns reflect broader worries about how increased water extraction can amplify existing environmental pressures in spring systems.

Ginnie Springs is one of the most popular places in Florida to go river tubing. Tubing the Santa Fe River as part of the Ginnie Springs tube run takes about 1 hour to complete from start to finish. Near the springs the water is 72 degrees Fahrenheit but warmer in the river.

Ginnie is also well known for camping. Visitors can make reservations for water and electric campsites. There are 129 water and electric campsites in total, which are located across from the park's store. A reservation is not needed for primitive campsites, but they are first-come, first-served. Because of the large number of recreational visitors, the problem all Florida springs face of nitrogen pollution is exacerbated due to the stirring of sediments and damage to native plants. These impacts accumulate over time, making it harder for the natural ecosystem to recover during busy seasons.
