= Poe Springs =

Spring in Florida, United States

Poe Springs Park
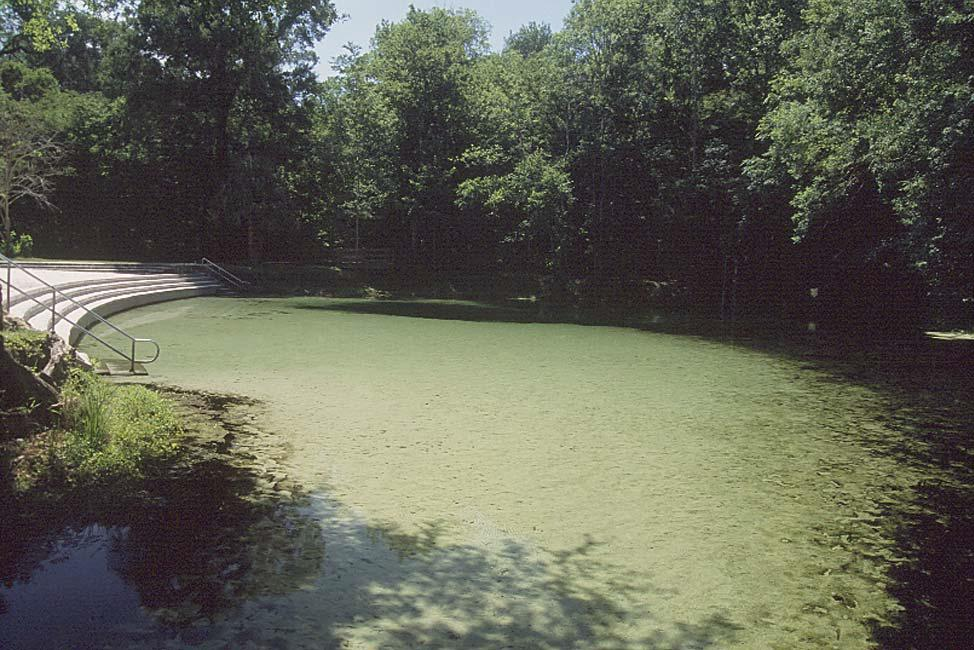
- Poe Springs, October 2004
- Interactive map of Poe Springs Park
- Type: County Park
- Location: 28800 NW 182nd Ave, High Springs, FL 32643
- Coordinates: 29.823°N 82.648°W
- Area: 202 acres (0.82 km^{2})
- Operator: Alachua County Parks and Recreation
- Website: https://alachuacounty.us/Depts/pcl/Pages/Details.aspx?park=Poe%20Springs%20Park

Poe Springs is a spring about 3 miles west of High Springs, Florida. It is located in Poe Springs Park, which is 202 acres in size. The spring is isolated from the main part of the park at its center, requiring a 0.3 mile hike one-way. The water temperature is 72 degrees Fahrenheit. It is managed by Alachua County Parks and Recreation and is $5.00 per car to visit. Poe Springs Park is the only county-run park that allows swimming. In addition to swimming, snorkeling is also popular. However, scuba diving is not allowed. The spring produces an average volume of 45 million gallons of water daily that feed into the Santa Fe River. The spring vent is 25 feet deep.

Prior to being acquired by Alachua County, the spring was eroding and neglected. After Hurricane Irma, the park was damaged and was closed temporarily and reopened in May 2018.

The springs historic flowrate through the 1970s was 72 cfs.

As of September 2026, the spring is no longer flowing following a prolonged drought in the region, and the park has been closed.
