= El Camino Real (Florida) =

Historic Spanish trail

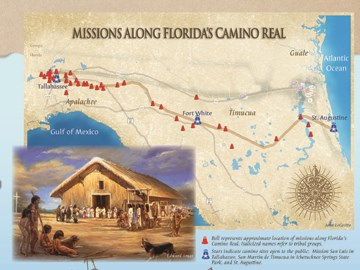
Modern map of trail across northern Florida used by the Spanish

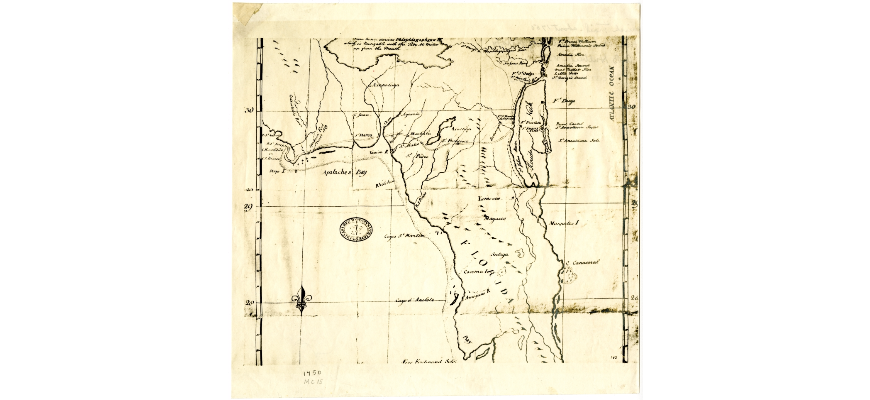
Map from 1750 of trails used by Spanish between St. Augustine and the Apalachee Province

El Camino Real (The Royal Road) is the name (rough English translation: The King's Highway) that the Spanish gave to a trail they cleared in the 1680s, mostly over the traditional trails of Native Americans, from St. Augustine westward to the Spanish missions in north Florida. Before this time, transpeninsular traffic in La Florida between the western mission settlements and the capital depended on water routes from Apalachee to St. Augustine. Agricultural commodities produced in Apalachee were carried by canoes to the Gulf of Mexico and southward on the coast to the mouth of the Suwanee River, then upriver to a location on the Santa Fe River. There they were loaded onto pack animals or the backs of Indian burdeners (porters) for the remainder of the overland trip. Provisions and funds from the real situado were sent on the same route in reverse.

In 1673, the Franciscan Friar Juan Moreno suggested to the Queen Regent Mariana of Spain that the situado, or annual subsidy transferred from the royal treasury of New Spain, should be transported overland from Vera Cruz in Mexico to Apalachee, and from there to St. Augustine. His suggestion was disregarded, since the route he proposed went through the territories of unchristianized Indians who were not always on friendly terms with the Spanish, while the situado, in the form of silver coins, would have to be carried by burdeners across the swamps, forests, and sizable bays and rivers of the Gulf of Mexico coast, which barred the passage of wagons or royal mule trains.

According to "El Camino Real", published by the Florida Division of Historical Resources: "In the 1680s, Florida Governor Diego de Quiroga y Losada contracted the services of military engineer Enrique Primo de Rivera to build a formal road across north Florida that was suitable for oxcarts. Although the project was never finished, people and goods continued to flow to and from the capital at St. Augustine, along the main corridor known as the Camino Real."

It could be said that the Spanish had an incomplete "trail" that very loosely connected the province of La Florida in the east to the Spanish settlements in Alta California in the west, through what historians call the Spanish borderlands, but it is a gross exaggeration to describe such a discontinuous pathway, the part on the Gulf of Mexico being merely Indian foot trails running along ridges, interrupted by large bodies of water and unbridged rivers with no ferries, as a "highway".

The Spanish never built an actual road south of St. Augustine. Some unreliable sources claim that they built a road to New Smyrna in 1632, but the place did not exist in 1632. The area at the time was a wilderness uninhabited by Europeans, while the colony of New Smyrna begun and named by the Scottish Dr. Andrew Turnbull was not founded until 1768. The British built the King's Road from Colerain, Georgia to New Smyrna, and the Spanish did use it when they reacquired Florida in 1783, but afterward they were rather lax in maintaining it.
