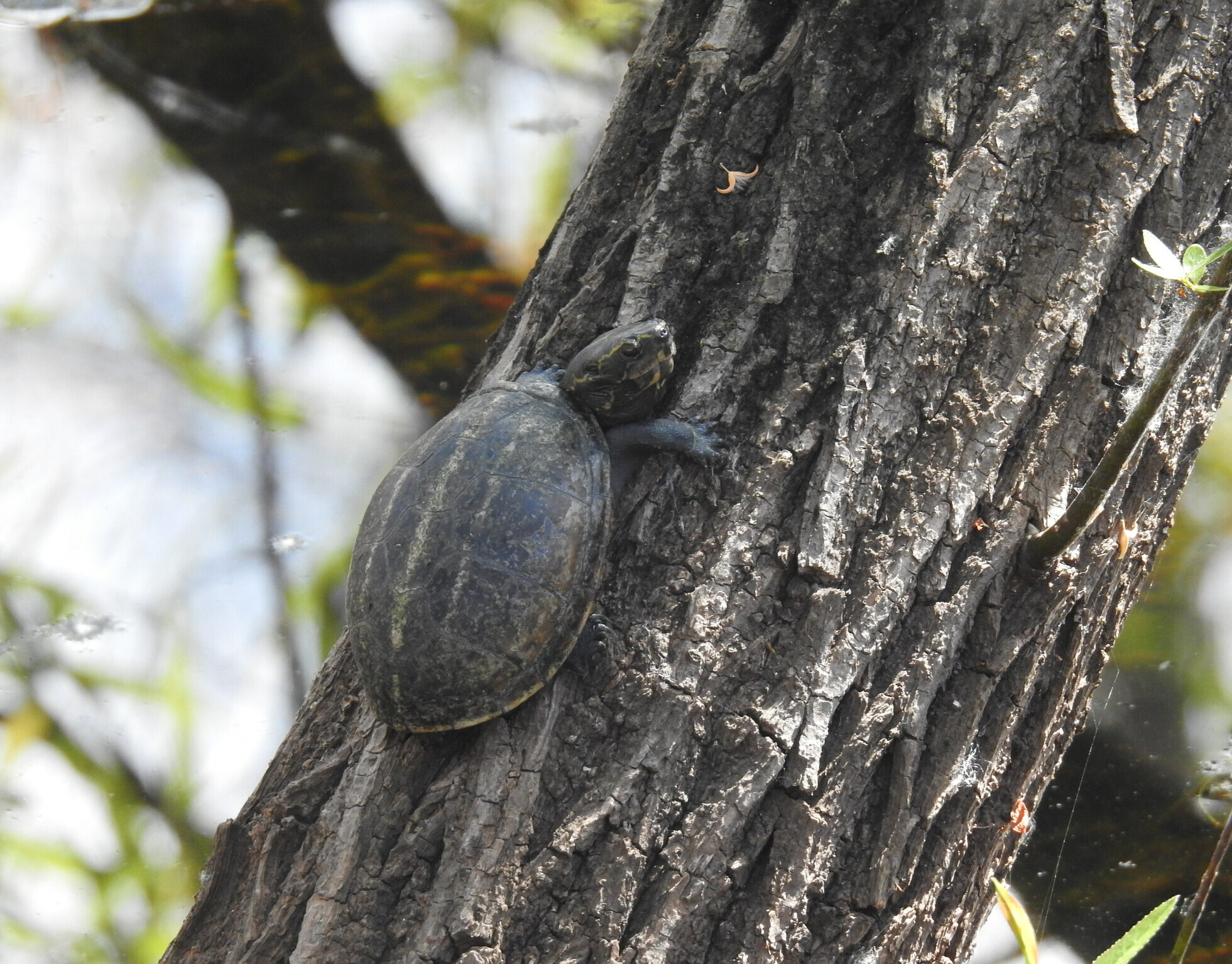
- Climbing a tree, Florida

Conservation status
- Near Threatened (IUCN 3.1)

Scientific classification
- Kingdom: Animalia
- Phylum: Chordata
- Class: Reptilia
- Order: Testudines
- Suborder: Cryptodira
- Family: Kinosternidae
- Genus: Kinosternon
- Species: K. baurii

Binomial name
- Kinosternon baurii (Garman, 1891)

Synonyms
- List: Cinosternum baurii Garman, 1891; Kinosternon baurii — Lönnberg, 1894; Kinosternon bauri palmarum Stejneger, 1925; Kinosternon bauri bauri — Mertens, L. Müller & Rust, 1934; Kinosternon baurii baurii — Stejneger & Barbour, 1939; Kinosternon baurii palmarum — Stejneger & Barbour, 1939

= Striped mud turtle =

Species of turtle

The striped mud turtle (Kinosternon baurii) is a species of turtle in the family Kinosternidae. The species is native to the southeastern United States.

== Etymology ==
The specific name, baurii, is in honor of herpetologist Georg Baur.

== Geographic range ==
The striped mud turtle is found in Florida, Georgia, North Carolina, South Carolina, Maryland, and Virginia.

== Description ==
K. baurii has three light-colored stripes along the length of the smooth carapace. It can grow to a straight carapace length of 8–12 cm (3–4¾ inches).

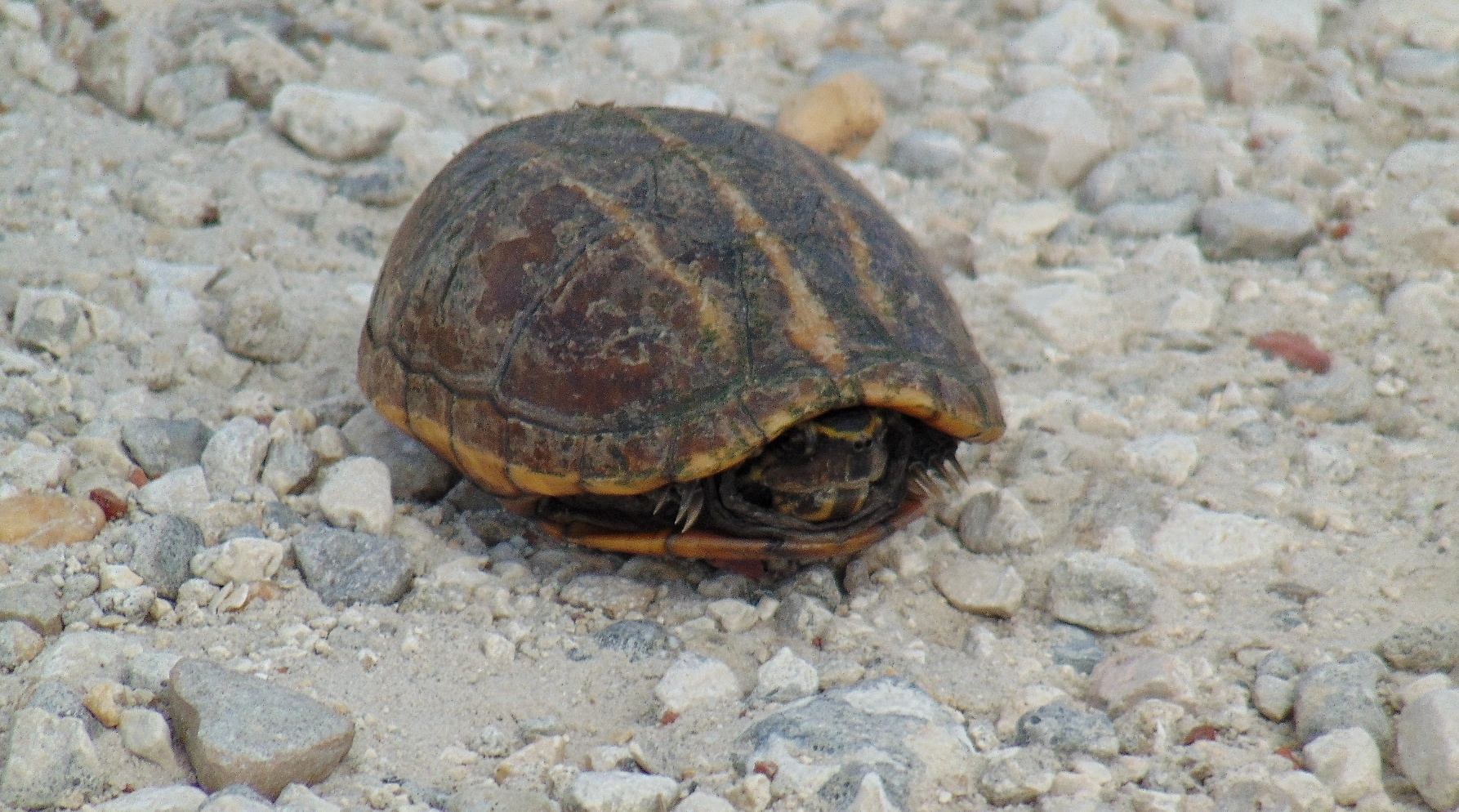
Carapace, Florida

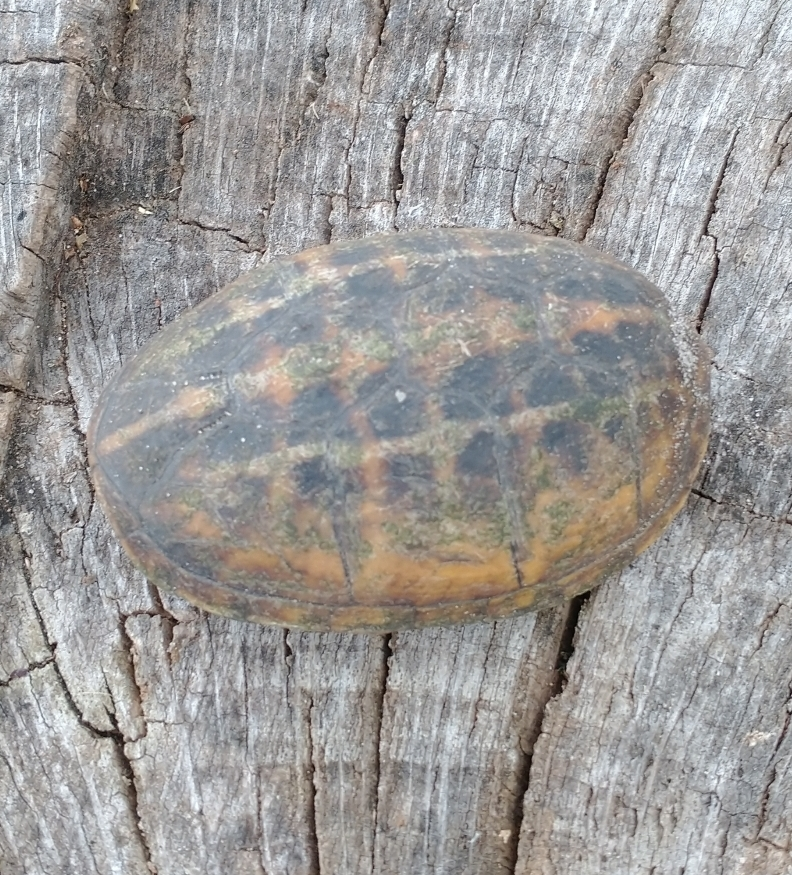
Carapace, Florida

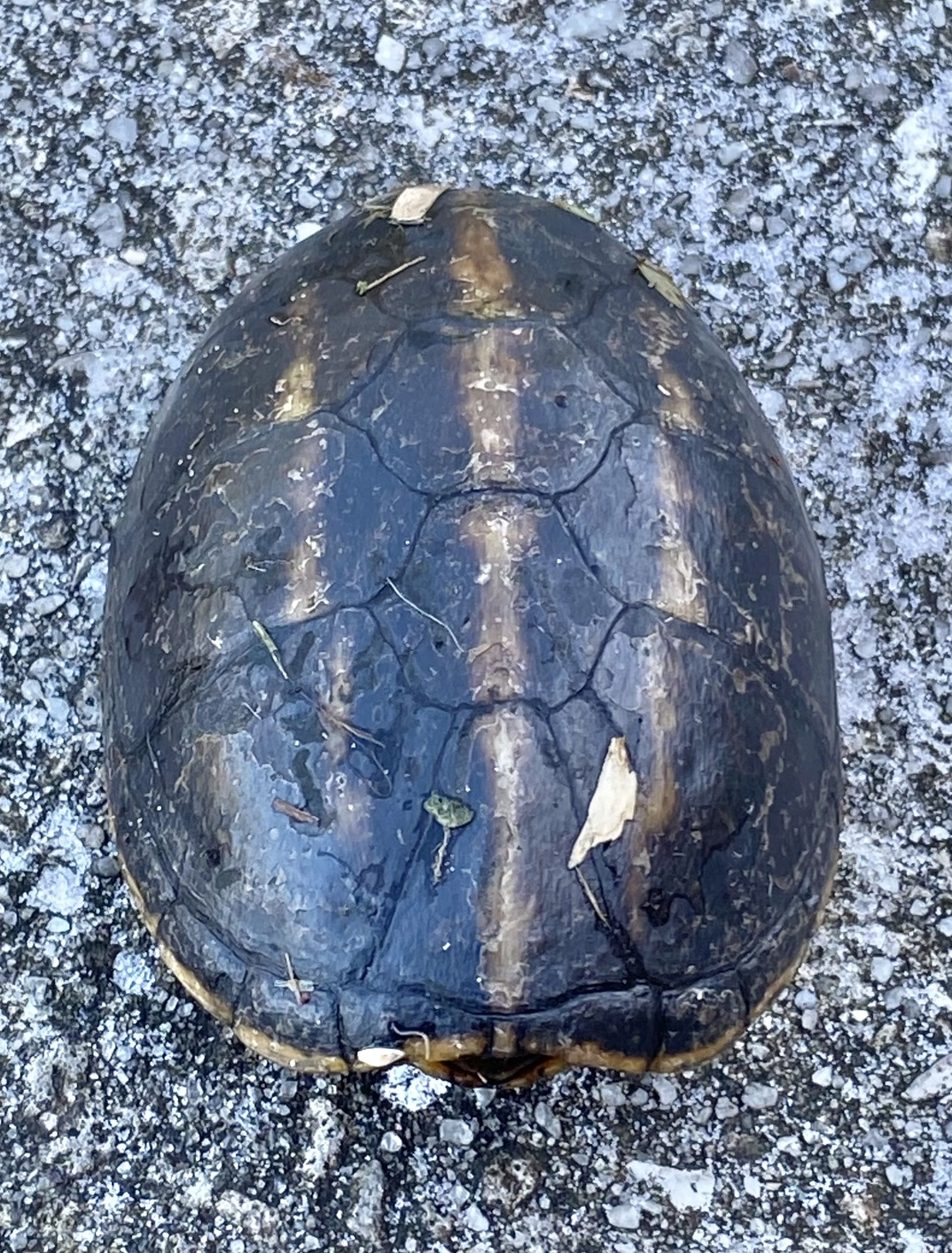
Carapace, Florida

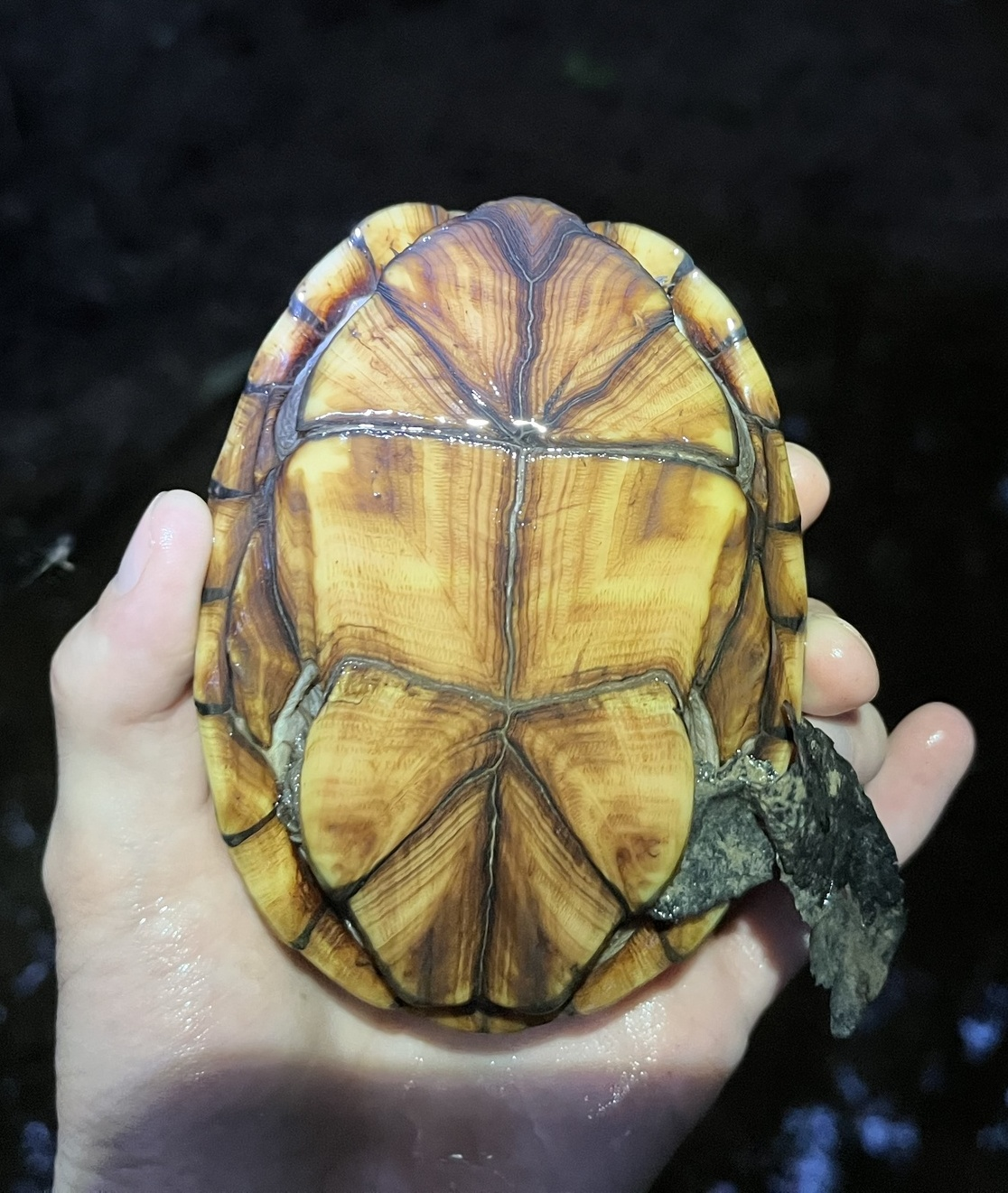
Plastron, North Carolina

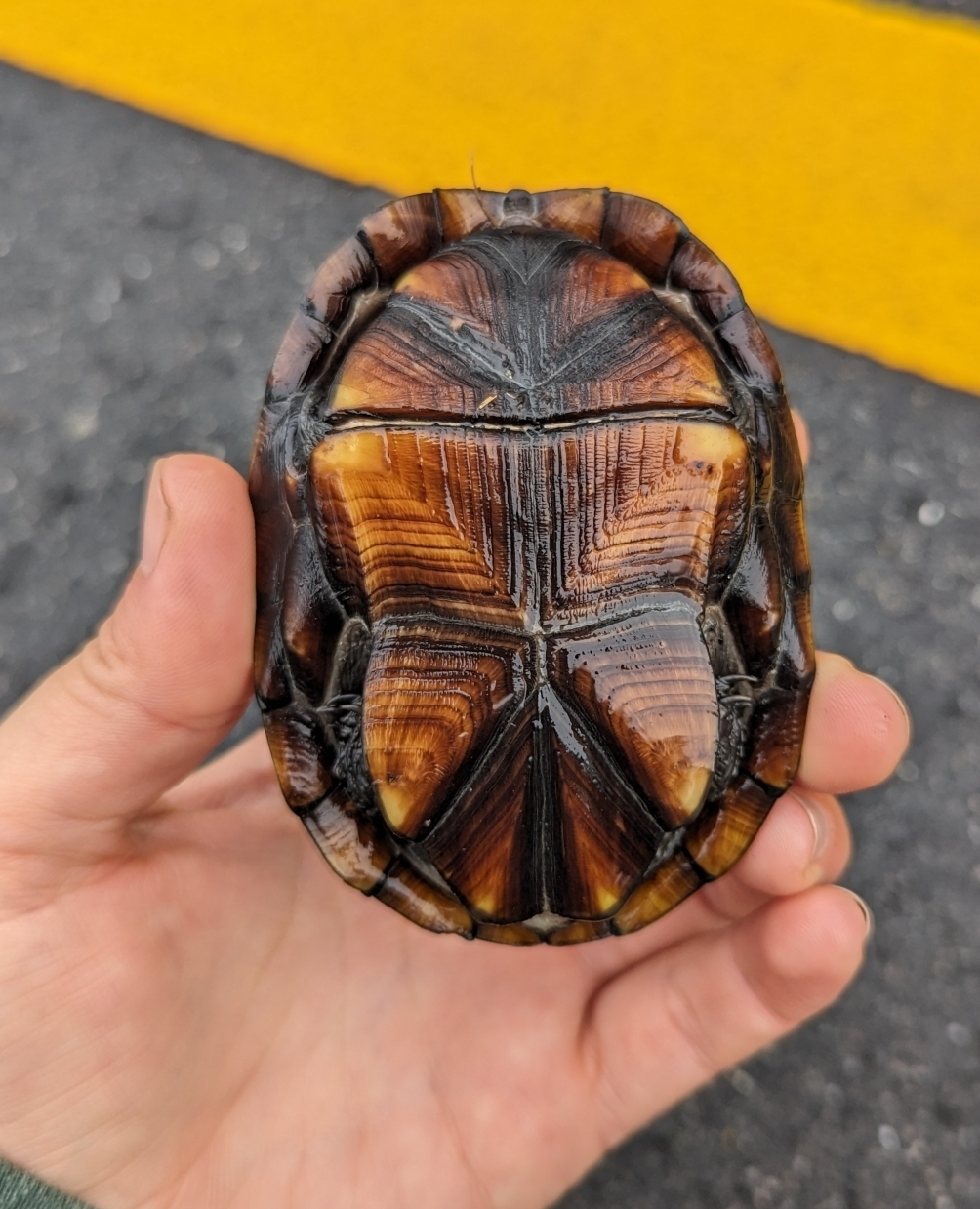
Plastron, Florida

== Habitat and behavior ==
K. baurii is a common species found in freshwater habitats. It wanders about on land more than any other of the mud turtles and can sometimes be observed foraging for food in cow dung.

== Diet ==
The striped mud turtle is omnivorous. It eats insects, snails, fish, carrion, algae, and plants. The striped mud turtle also eats dried up krill.

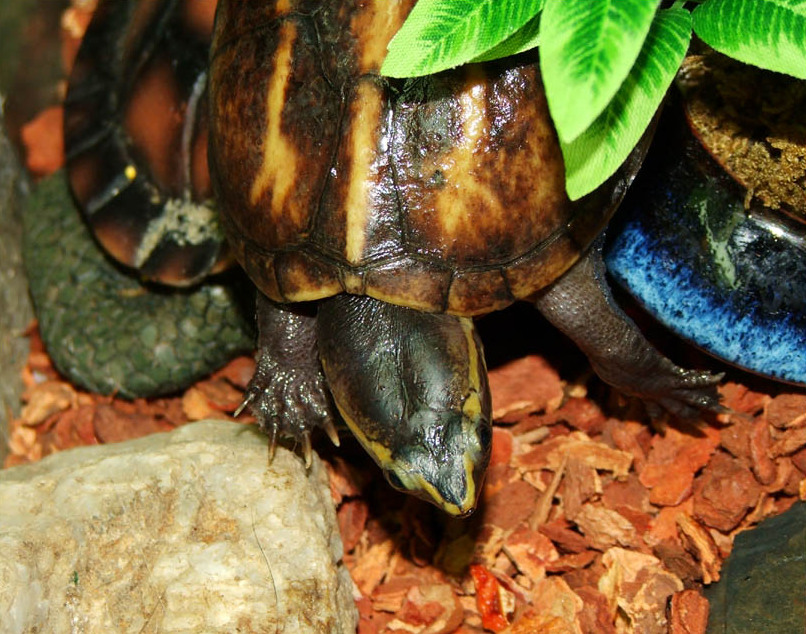
In captivity

== Captivity ==
As a pet K. baurii is easy to care for, readily eating commercial turtle foods, feeder fish, and worms. Kept communally, they may exhibit aggressive behavior towards each other, most likely males are more inclined to fight than females.

== Reproduction ==
Adult females of K. baurii nest from September to June. The eggs, which are slightly over 2.5 cm (1 in) long, hatch 13 to 19 weeks later. The hatchlings are about 2.5 cm (1 inch) in straight carapace length and, unlike the adult turtles, have keeled carapaces.

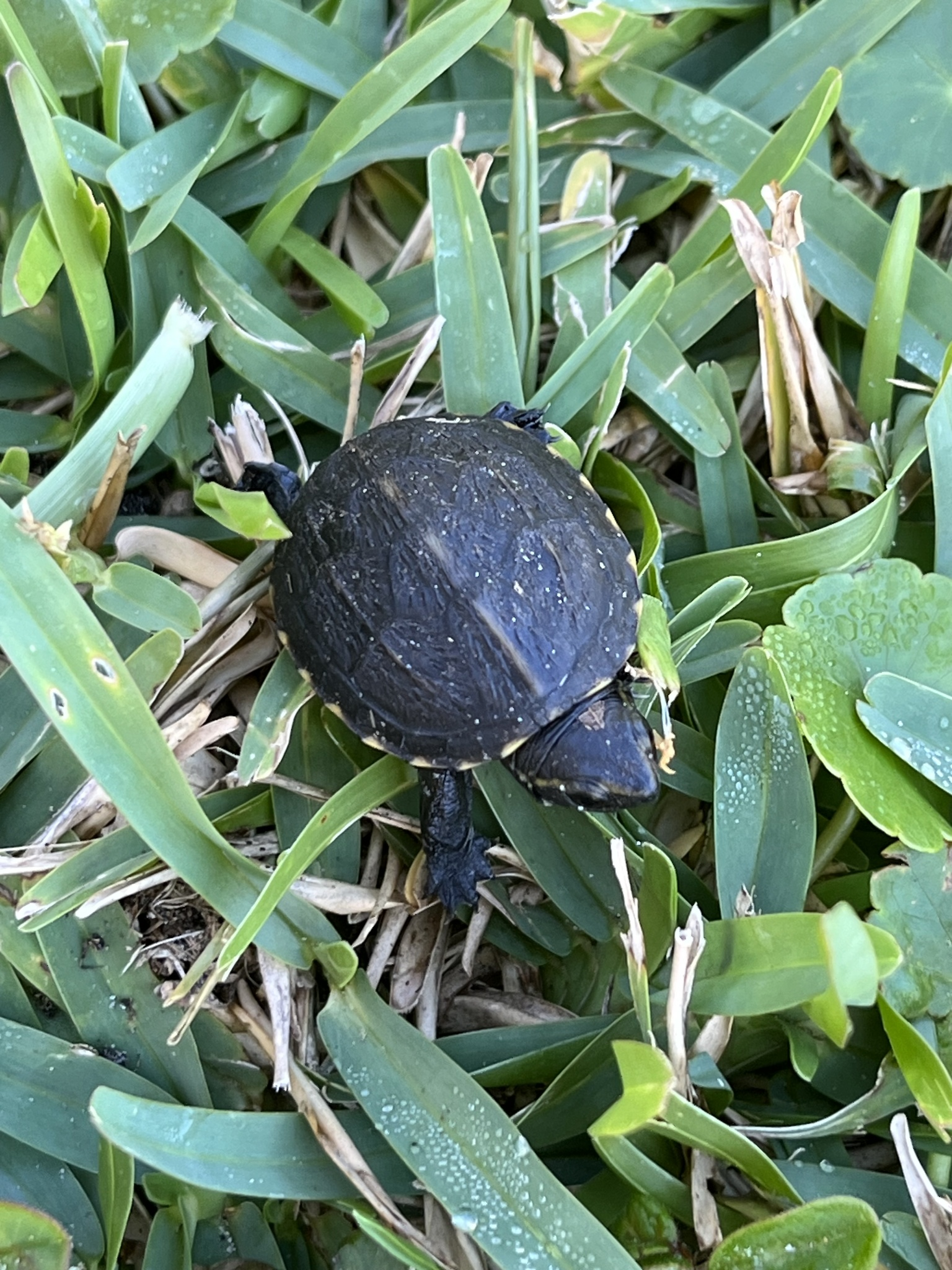
Hatchling carapace, Florida

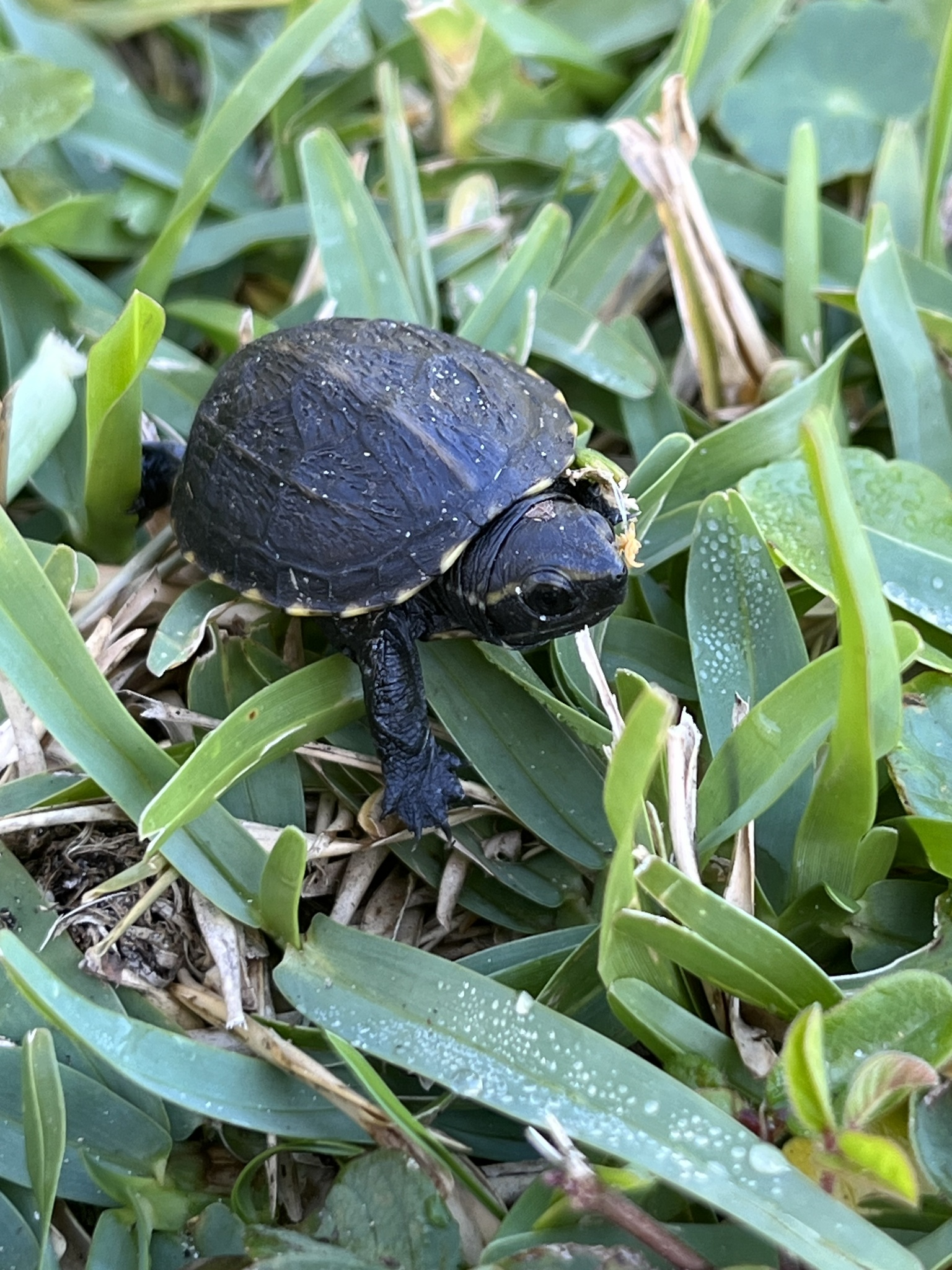

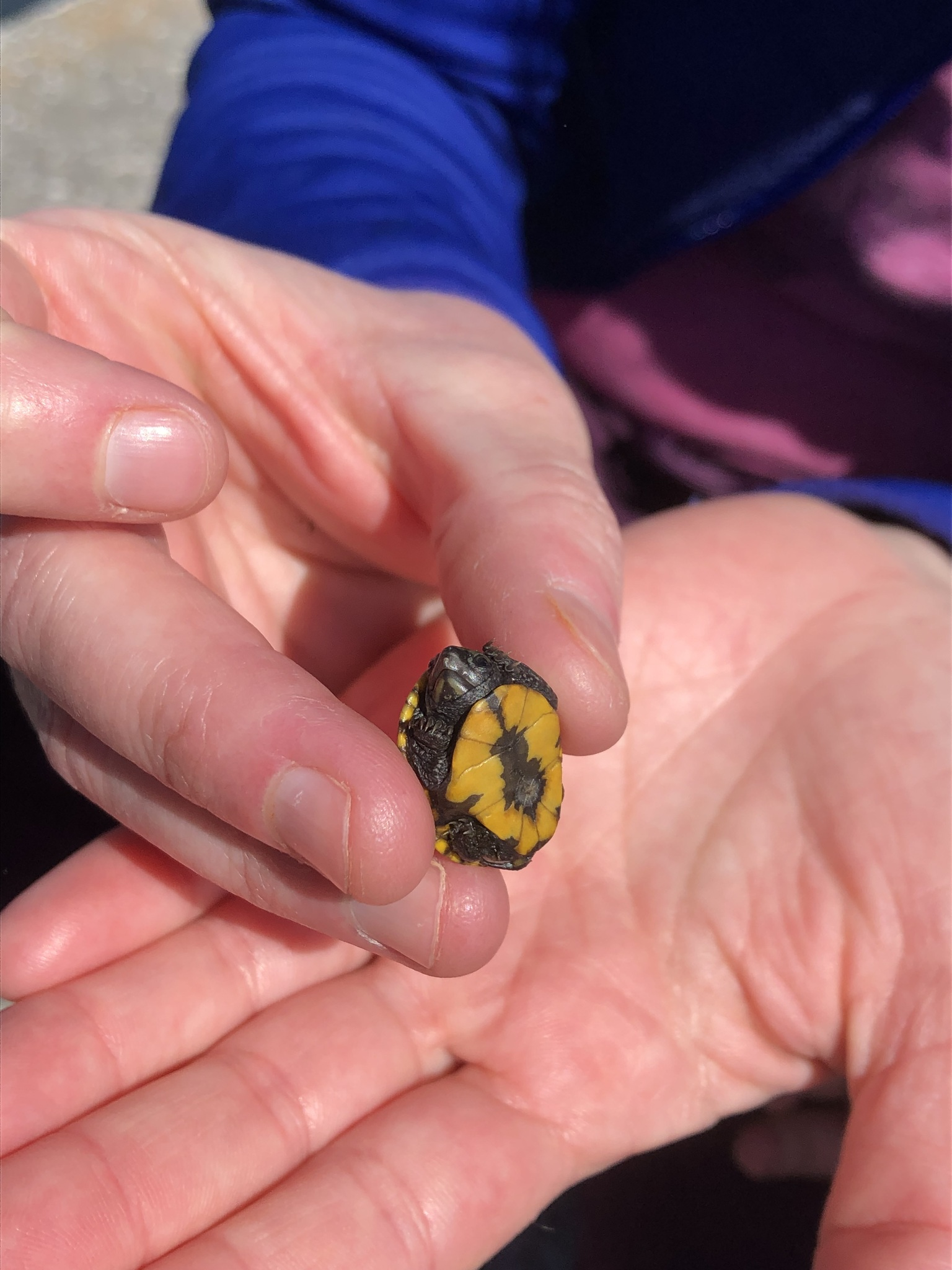
Hatchling plastron, Florida

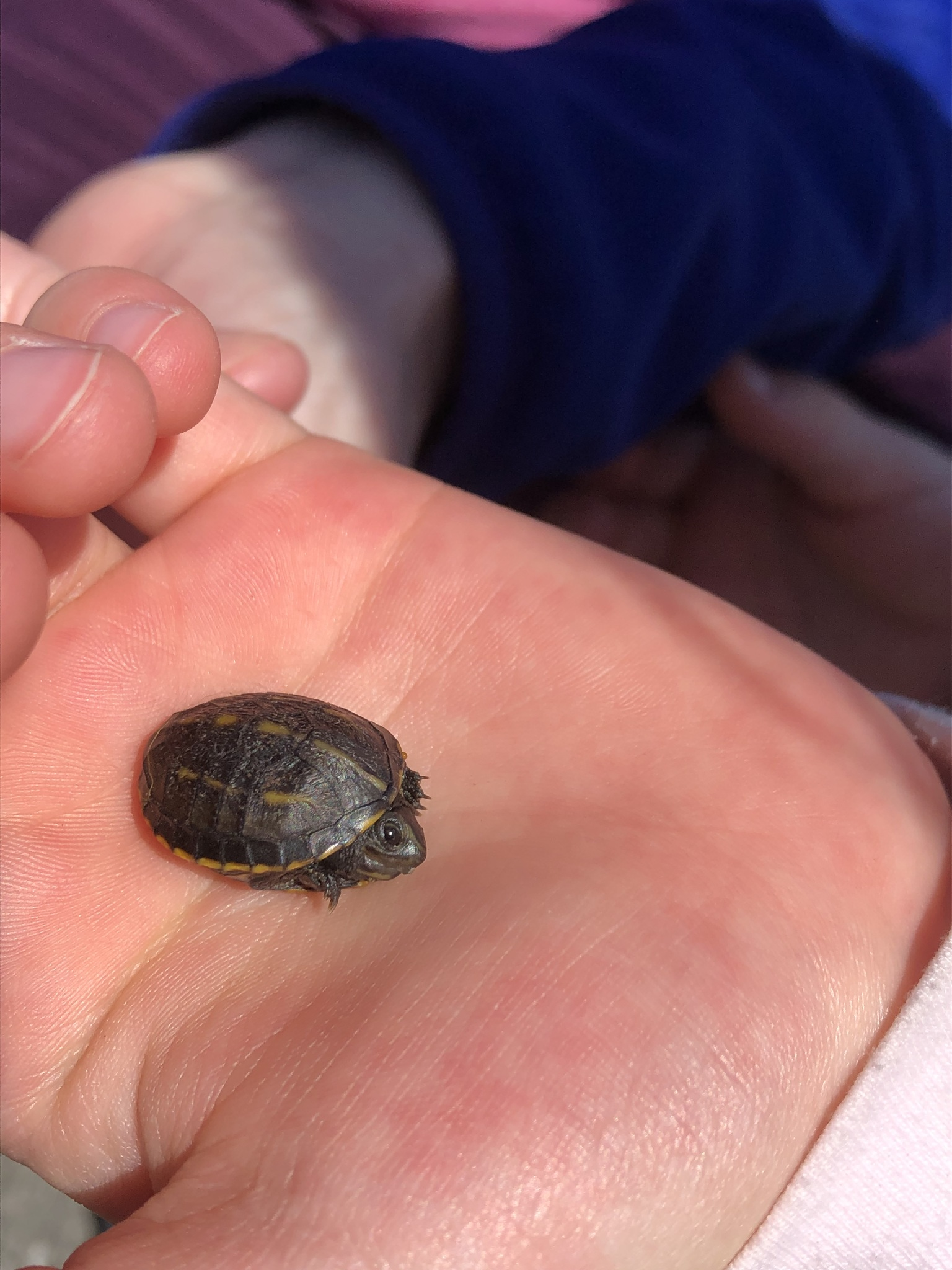
