= Lake Santa Fe =

Lake in the state of Florida, United States

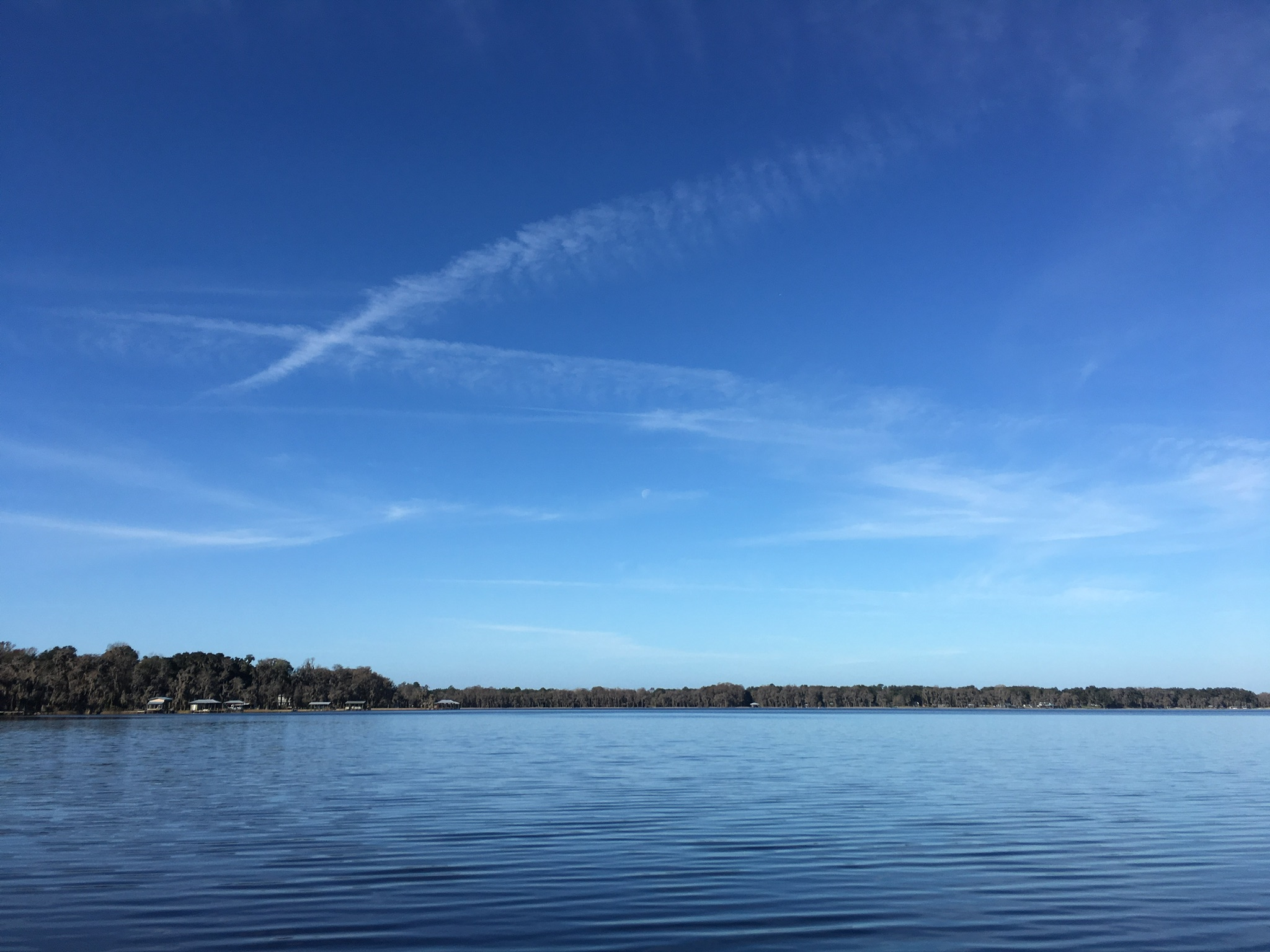
- Lake in January 2020

- Location within Florida Location within the United States
- Location: Alachua County, Florida
- Coordinates: 29°44′22″N 082°04′33″W
- Primary inflows: springs
- Primary outflows: Santa Fe River
- Basin countries: United States
- Surface area: 5,850 acres (2,370 ha)
- Surface elevation: 141 ft (43 m)

Lake Santa Fe is a 5,850-acre (2,370 ha) lake that is fed by seepage from the Floridan Aquifer in northeastern Alachua County, Florida. The lake is located entirely in Alachua County, but is bounded on the east and South side by Bradford County, Clay County, and Putnam County. The Alachua County boundary extends to the ordinary high water line (normally the shoreline), which is 141 feet (43 m) above mean sea level.

It forms the headwaters of the Santa Fe River, exiting from a "little" northern area (Little Lake Santa Fe) emptying into the Suwannee River. Lake Santa Fe offers abundant wildlife, excellent fishing and recreational boating. It is one of the largest and most stable lakes in Florida.

At "the pass" between the "big" southern arm and Little Lake Santa Fe shad school, and fishing is usually good for schooling largemouth bass and stocked sunshine bass. Numerous homes surround the lake, most with docks and ski boats; fishing is always best early and late or at night and on weekdays. In spite of development, the fish habitat is outstanding with many areas of bald cypress and healthy maidencane grass beds. The lake was stocked with 44,500 hybrid striped bass in April 2005. The previous stocking of the lake occurred in 1997.

Lake Santa Fe is the third most stable of 120 lakes studied in Florida, as well as one of the clearest. It is designated by the State of Florida as an Outstanding Florida Water. It is supported by water flowing in at the southern extremity of the intermediate aquifer that outcrops in the lake bottom. Also it is a rather deep example of a karstic lake, with several spots that are 30-foot (9.1 m) or more.

Lake Santa Fe was the largest of a series of lakes that were connected by dredging canals in the 1870s and 1880s so that boats could travel between Melrose, Florida (at the time the center of a thriving citrus and tourist industry) and Waldo, the railroad terminal. The canal was dredged from Little Lake Santa Fe into Lake Alto. This canal is visible today. Water and railroad were the major means of transportation for passengers and freight across Florida at that time. Prosperity in this area followed the Reconstruction. The first boat that made the journey through the canal system was the "Fannie S. Lewis" in 1880, and the last was the "City of Melrose" in 1925. Improved roads and the automobile doomed the era of steamships in Alachua County and the canals fell into disuse.

The rural unincorporated communities of Melrose and Earleton are located on the lake. North of the lakes is Santa Fe Swamp, mostly a wildlife and environmental conservation area managed by the Suwannee River Water Management District.
