= Santa Fe River (Florida) =

River in the United States of America

Santa Fe
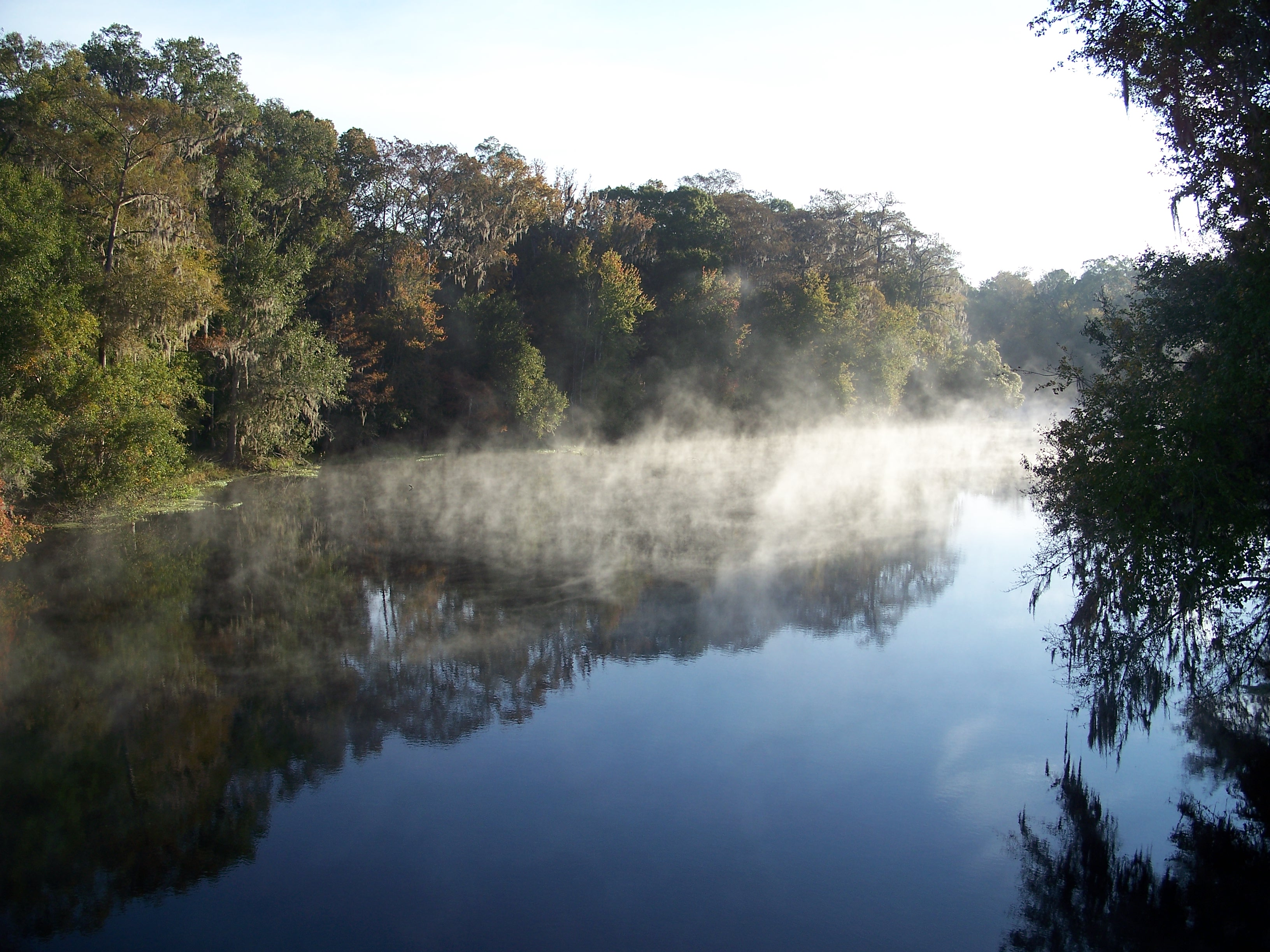
- Santa Fe River, north of High Springs

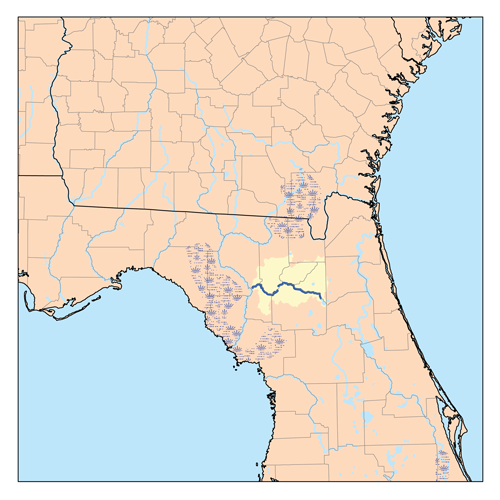
- Santa Fe River Drainage Basin
- Etymology: Spanish

Location
- Country: United States
- State: Florida
- Cities: Keystone Heights, Branford

Physical characteristics
- Source: Lake Santa Fe
  - location: Alachua County, Florida
- Mouth: Suwannee River
  - location: Branford, Florida
- Length: 75 mi (121 km)
- Basin size: 1,380 sq mi (3,600 km^{2})

The Santa Fe River is a 75-mile (121 km) river in northern Florida. The watershed of the river is approximately 1,380 square miles (3,574 km^{2}) and spreads across southern Columbia, southern Suwannee, western Bradford, far southern Baker, Union, northern and eastern Gilchrist, and northern Alachua counties. The headwaters of the river are Lake Santa Fe, near Keystone Heights. The Santa Fe River is usually a slow-flowing river. This slow speed, combined with the abundant leaf-drop from nearby trees, especially Bald Cypress, leads to a very dark-brown river due to dissolved tannins.

The tributaries of the Santa Fe include the New River, Olustee Creek, and the Ichetucknee River, another spring-fed river. The Santa Fe empties into the Suwannee River near Branford, Florida.

The river derives its name from a Franciscan mission named Santa Fé de Toloca formerly located near the river.

== Karst features ==
The Santa Fe River is typical of many rivers in karst regions in that it completely disappears underground and then reappears 5 kilometres (3 mi) downstream. The river drops into a large sinkhole in O'Leno State Park and reappears in the adjacent River Rise Preserve State Park. The land over the underground section of the river, referred to as a natural bridge, was used for the main route of the Spanish mission trail and the Bellamy Road to avoid a water crossing of the Santa Fe River.

Springs like Gilchrist Blue, Ginnie, Treehouse (fed in part by the underground run of Hornsby Spring), Lily, Poe, and Rum Island springs are located at the banks of the river, mostly downstream of the river's reappearance above ground level. The water temperature near the numerous springs is always around 72 °F (22 °C).

== Fauna ==
The area is sparsely populated compared to the rest of Florida, there have been sightings of animals like the black bear, bobcat, the rare Florida panther and due to the near-constant water temperatures along many portions of the river, manatees. As with many rivers in Florida, plant and animal fossil remnants are plentiful along the Santa Fe.

The Santa Fe River watershed, including its springs, is a diversity hotspot for freshwater turtles. Eleven species of turtles are found in the watershed, including: chicken turtle (Deirochelys reticularia), common snapping turtle (Chelydra serpentina), eastern musk or stinkpot turtle (Sternotherus odoratus), Florida red-bellied cooter (Pseudemys nelsoni), Florida softshell turtle (Apalone ferox), loggerhead musk turtle (Sternotherus minor), peninsula cooter (Pseudemys peninsularis), pool slider (Trachemys scripta), striped mud turtle (Kinosternon baurii), Suwannee alligator snapping turtle (Macrochelys suwanniensis), and Suwannee cooter (Pseudemys concinna suwanniensis).

== List of crossings ==
| Crossing | Carries | Image | Location | Coordinates |
|---|---|---|---|---|
| Headwaters (Santa Fe Lake) | | | Waldo | 29.44248°N 82.04311°W |
| Culvert | County Road 1471 | | Waldo | 29.831823°N 82.137833°W |
| | Wildwood Subdivision (Railroad) | | Waldo | 29.833462°N 82.149002°W |
| 260107, 260108 | US 301 | | Hampton | 29.839430°N 82.163572°W |
| | Unnamed Road | | Hampton | 29.845497°N 82.205842°W |
| | N County Road 225 | | Hampton | 29.846297°N 82.219421°W |
| | SW 136th Avenue | | Brooker | 29.847093°N 82.263991°W |
| 260025 | SR 235 | | Brooker | 29.878799°N 82.336211°W |
| 260032 | County Road 1493 | | Brooker | 29.881297°N 82.384824°W |
| Confluence with New River | | | Worthington Springs | 29.923204°N 82.418574°W |
| 260111 | SR 121 | | Worthington Springs | 29.921824°N 82.426330°W |
| 260086 | SW County Road 241 | | Worthington Springs | 29.942729°N 82.506794°W |
| 290086, 290087 | I-75 | | High Springs | 29.926593°N 82.558769°W |
| 260112 | US 41 / US 441 | | High Springs | 29.853014°N 82.608462°W |
| 260006 | US 27 | | High Springs | 29.842745°N 82.630659°W |
| 310007 | SR 47 | | Fort White | 29.865017°N 82.740092°W |
| confluence with Ichetucknee River | | | Fort White | 29.932325°N 82.800262°W |
| 310005 | US 129 | | Branford | 29.911679°N 82.860095°W |
| Mouth (Suwannee River) | | | Branford | 29.887257°N 82.879563°W |
