= O'Leno State Park =

State park in Florida, United States

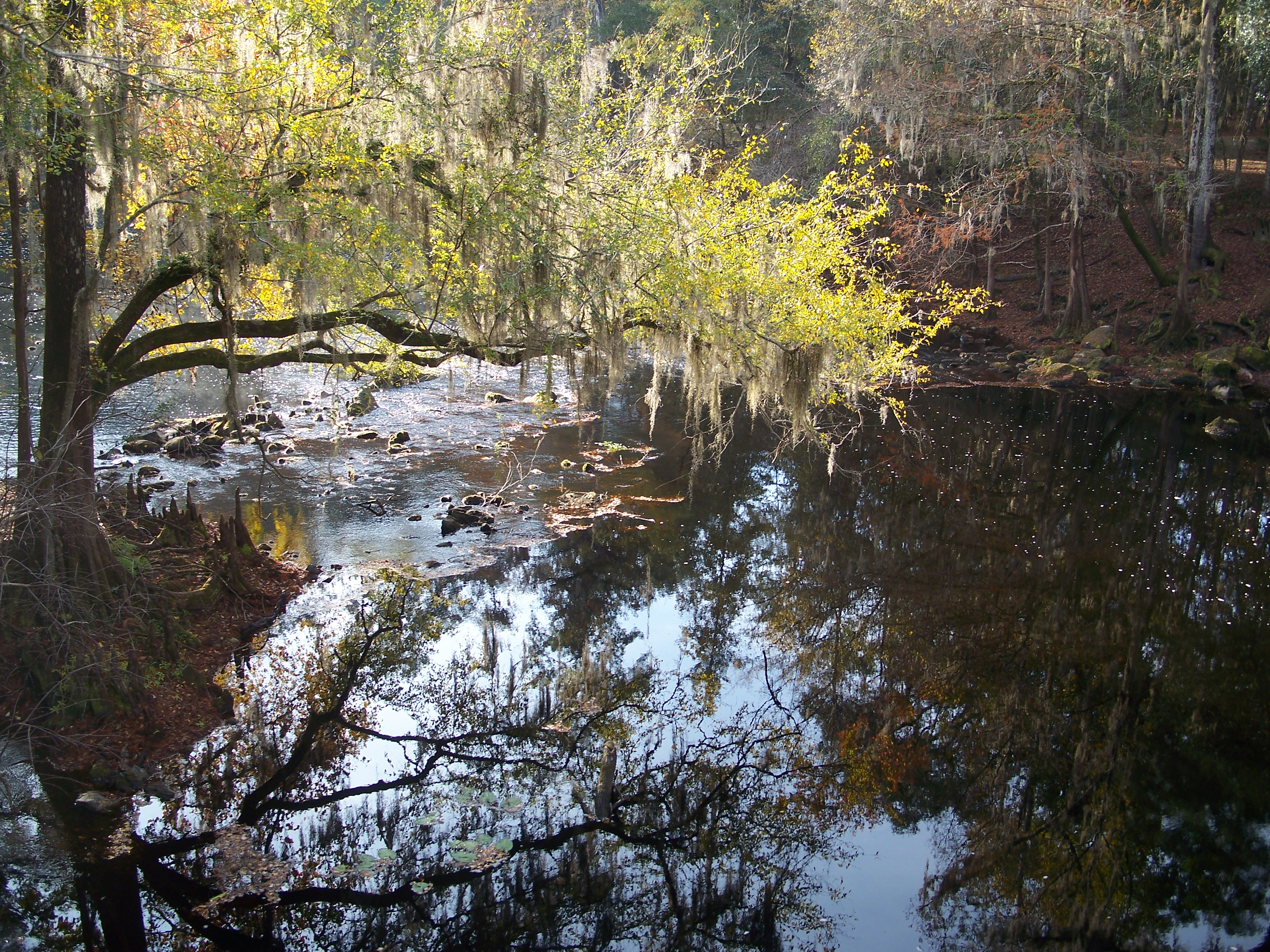
- Santa Fe River

- Location within Florida Location within the United States
- Interactive map of O'Leno State Park
- Location: Columbia County, Florida, USA
- Nearest city: High Springs, Florida
- Coordinates: 29°55′01″N 82°35′02″W
- Governing body: Florida Department of Environmental Protection

O'Leno State Park is a Florida State Park located on the Santa Fe River six miles north of High Springs on U.S. 441. Many facilities at the park were built by the Civilian Conservation Corps in the 1930s.

== History ==
A town called Keno, also the name of a lotto gambling game, was once at the location of the park. There was a cotton gin and a sawmill there. In 1876, ministers and businessmen moved to change the name to Leno to improve the town's reputation. The current name refers to "Old Leno". After the railroad bypassed the town, it became a ghost town.

Camp O'Leno opened in 1938 as a Florida Forest Service training camp for employees and youth groups. It became a state park in 1940, joining the original nine parks of the Florida Park Service.

== Geology ==
The park is made up of sinkholes, hardwood hammocks, river swamps, and sandhills. The Santa Fe River runs through the park, disappearing into a sinkhole and re-appearing approximately 5.6 km (3.5 miles) away at River Rise Preserve State Park, forming a natural land bridge. At one time, the historic Bellamy Road ran across this land bridge.

== Fauna ==
Among the wildlife of the park are white-tailed deer, squirrel, alligators, turtles, raccoons and gopher tortoises.

== Recreational activities ==
Amenities include a more than 21 km (13 miles) of hiking, biking and horseback riding trails, picnic pavilions, and a full-facility campground which includes family, primitive, youth and group camping.

== Hours ==
O'Leno State Park is open between 8 a.m. and sundown every day of the year (including holidays).

== Gallery ==
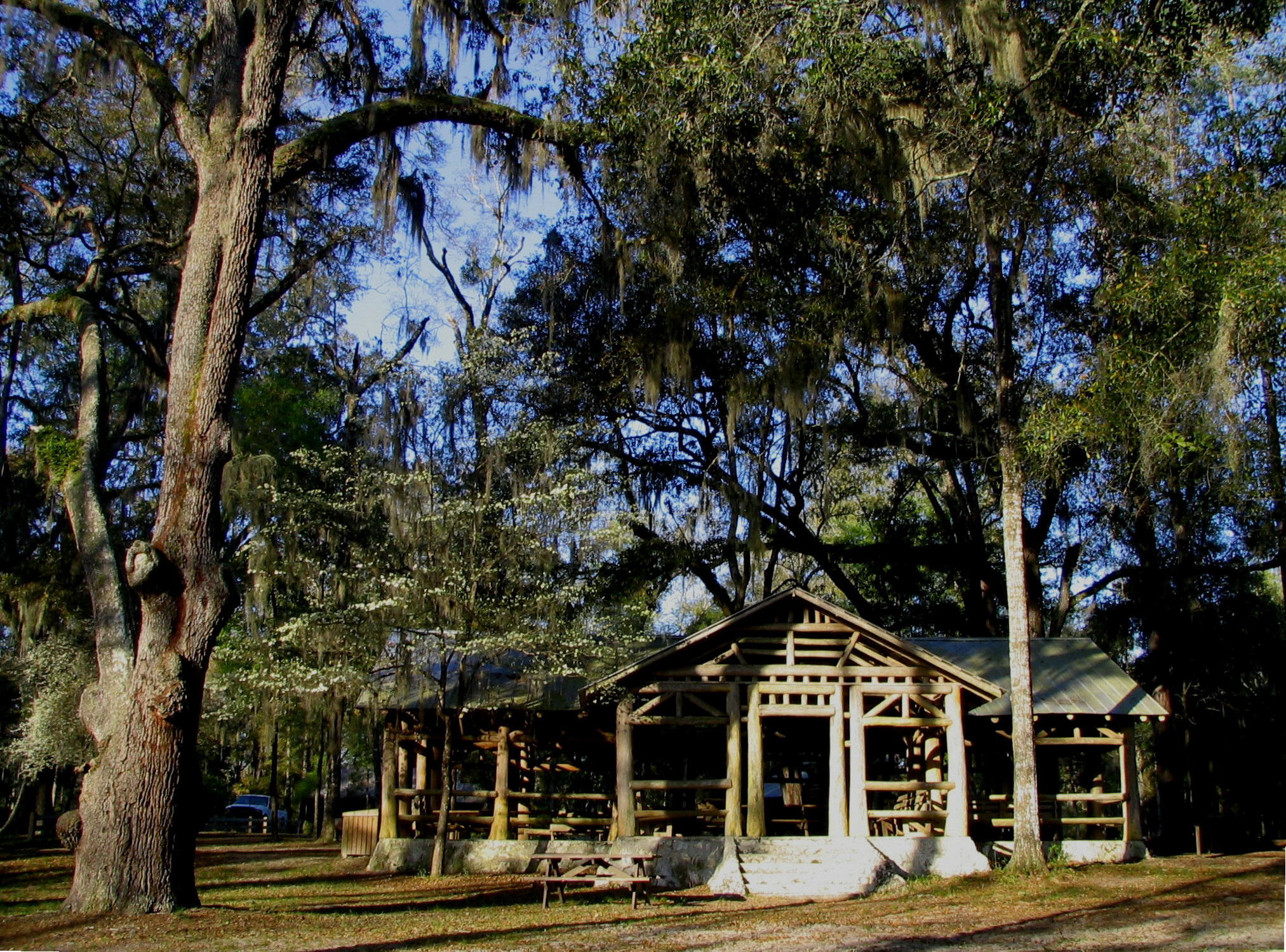
Picnic shelter built by the CCC

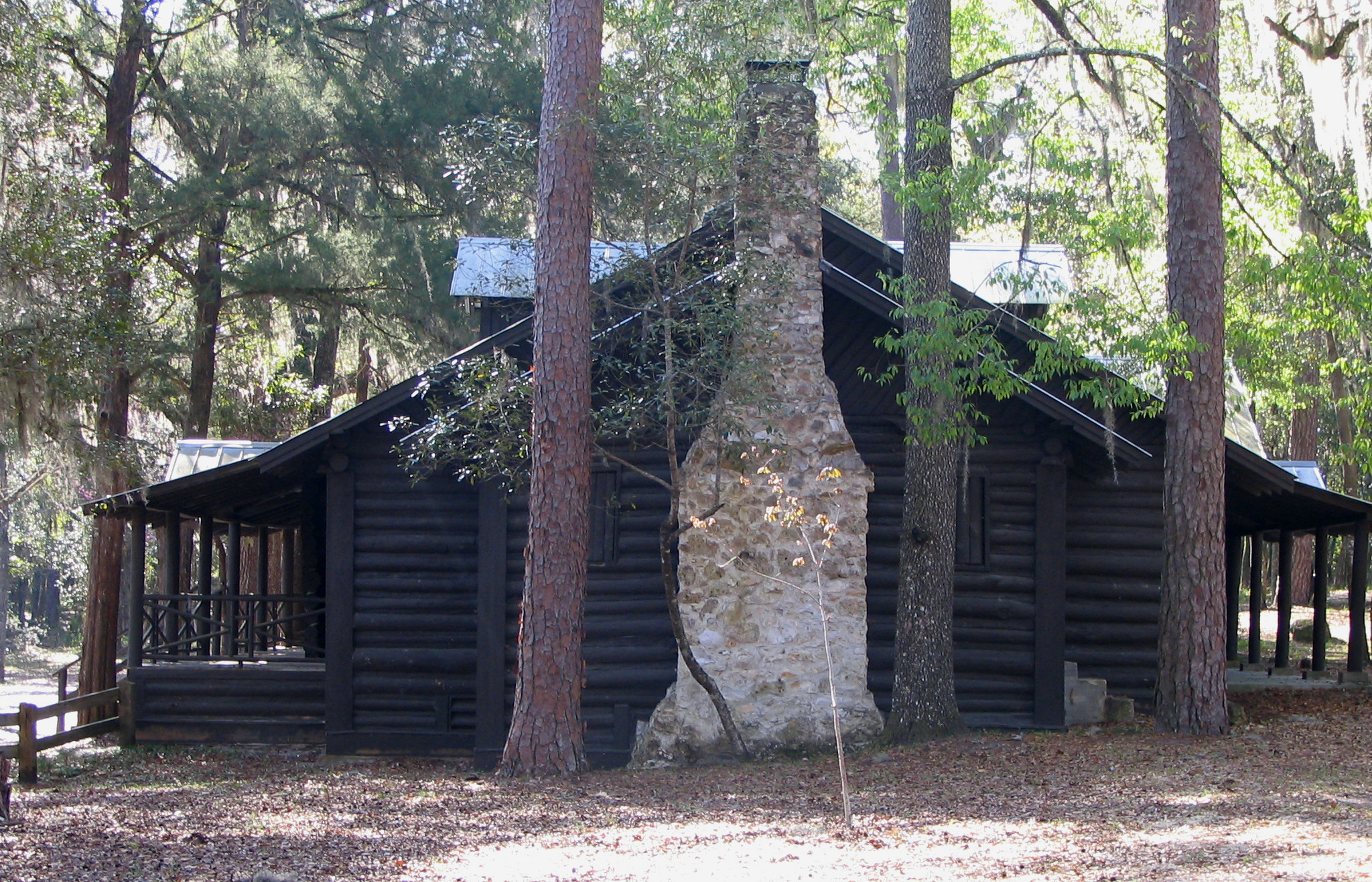
CCC-built recreation hall

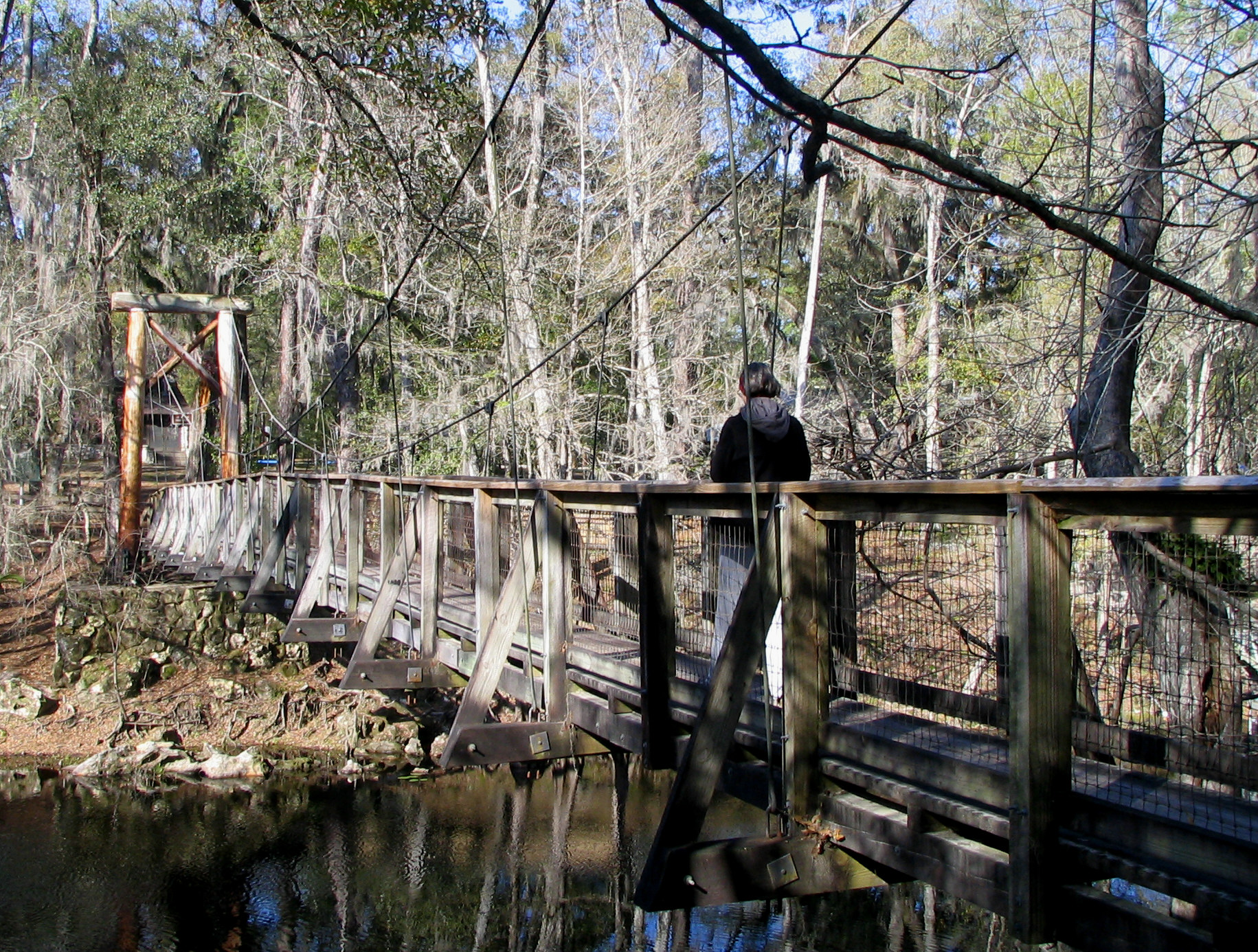
Suspension footbridge, also CCC-built

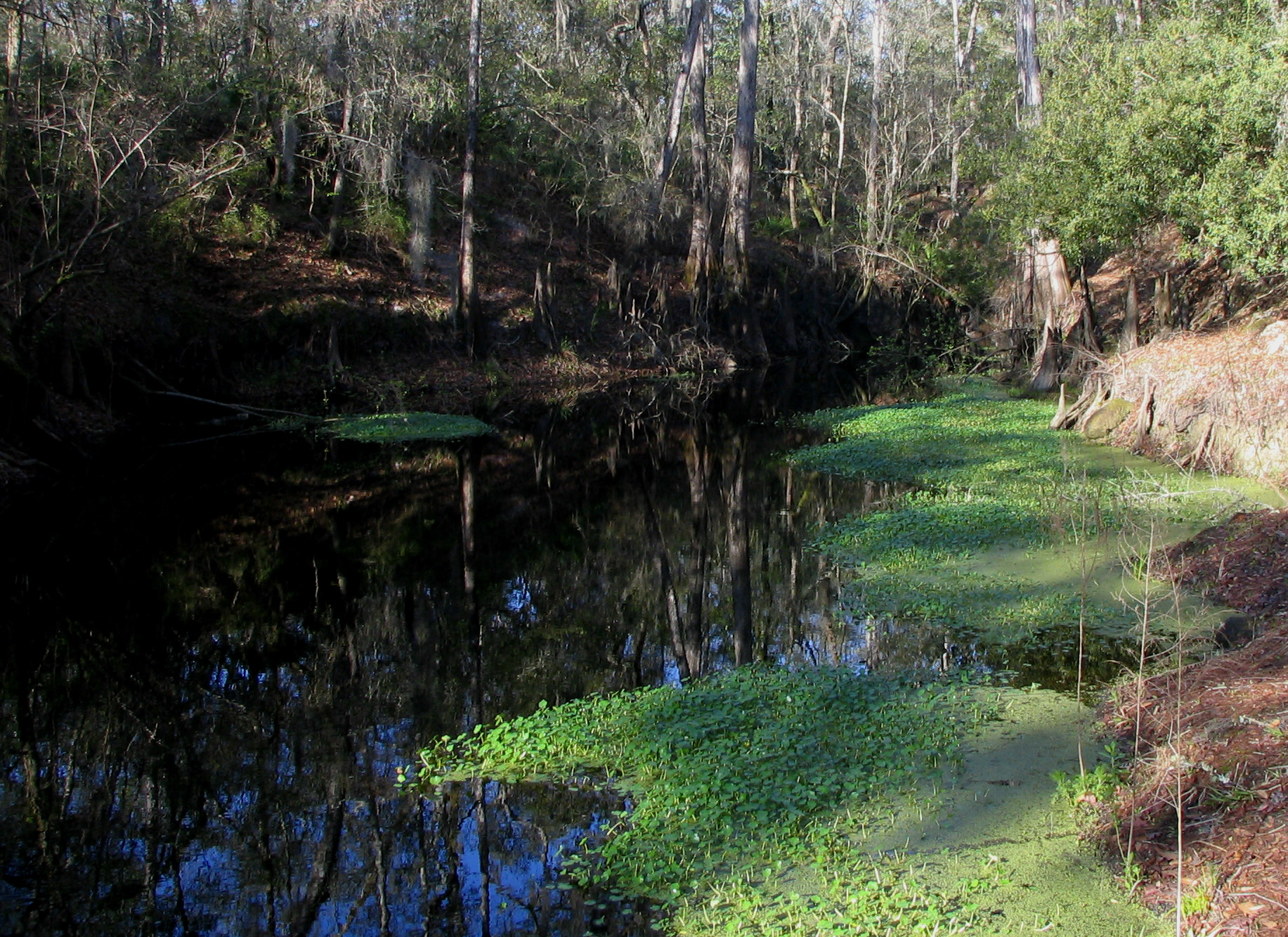
One of many sinkholes in the park

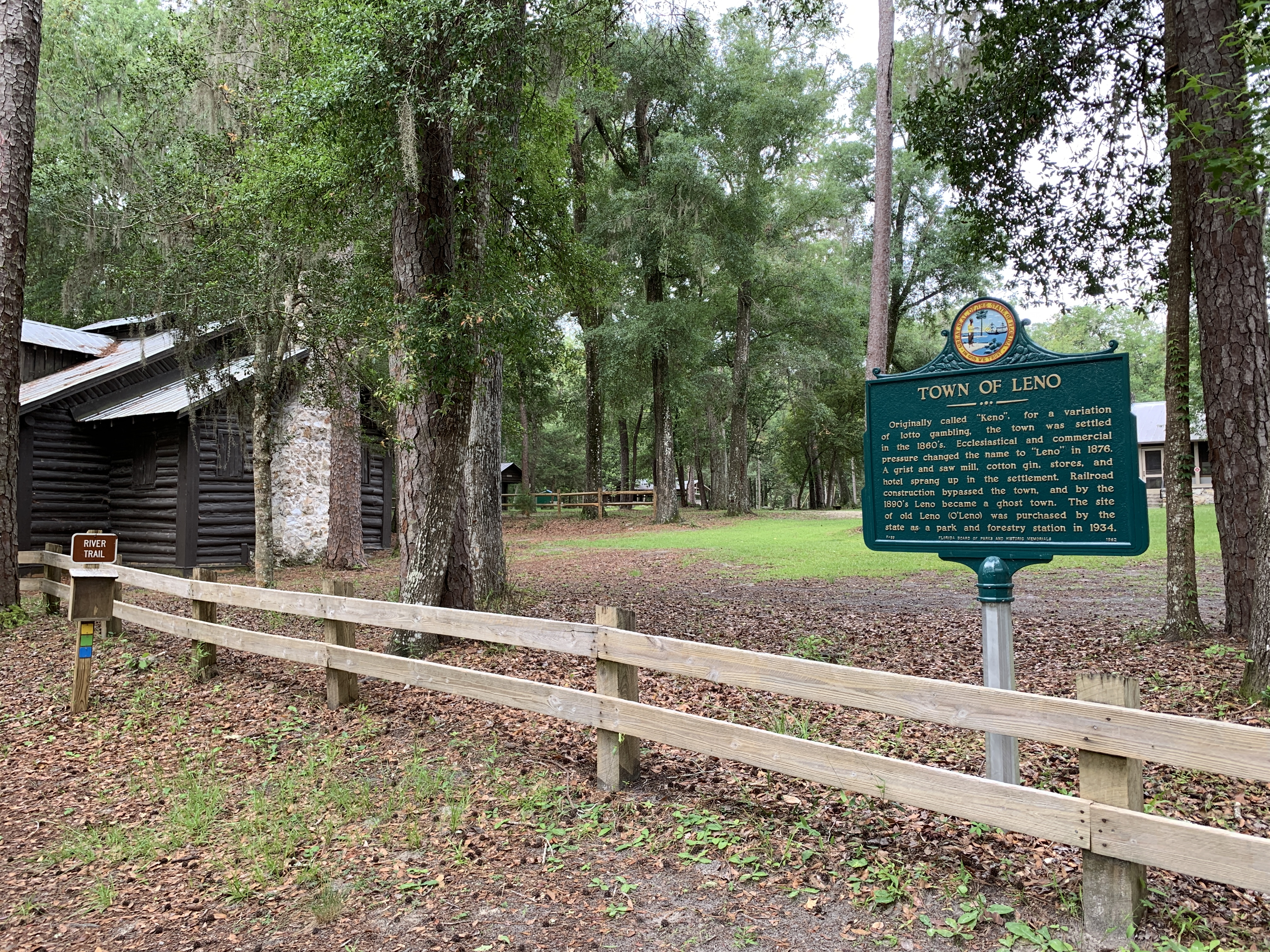
Leno, Florida marker
