= List of missions in Spanish Florida =

The Spanish established missions in Spanish Florida from the founding of San Augustin and Santa Elena in 1565 until the History of Florida#British rule (1763–1783)transfer of Florida to Great Britain in 1763. Throughout those two centuries there were mission churches in the present-day states of Florida, and Georgia, and for a brief period from 1655 to 1670, in South Carolina and Virginia.

This list includes doctrinas, missions that normally had one or more resident missionaries, but does not include visitas, which never had a resident missionary, and had less substantial church buildings where services were conducted by visiting missionaries.

Missions in Spanish Florida
Mission Name	Location	Province or Region	Active Period (Note: Documentation of when missions were active is incomplete. Years listed in this column may not represent either the earliest or the latest year in which a mission was in use.)	References
Apalo (Note: Place name. Mission name unknown.)		Potano	Unknown	
Ajacán	_{37.23796, -76.50743}	Virginia	1570	
Assumpción del Puerto or Assumpción de Nuestra Señora (Note: Assumpción served Amacano, Chine, and Pacara people living in Apalachee Province.)		Apalachee	1675	
Attissimi, or Atisme, or Jizime		Jororo	1693–1697	
Cofa (mouth of Suwannee River)		Potano	Unknown	
Escamau-Orista		Santa Elena	1566–1570	
Espogache (Note: Espogache, Tolomato, and Tupiqui were neighboring towns in Guale which seem to have merged, or to have hosted the mission of Nuestra Señora de Guadalupe in sequence.)		Guale	1605–?	
Guale	_{31.62534, -81.17348}	Guale	1568–1570	
Guatari		Santa Elena	1566–1570	
Ivitachuco at Abosaya (Note: Refugees from San Lorenzo de Ivitachuco tried to settle here, but were driven on to St. Augustine by Muscogee and other raiders.)		Potano	1704–1706	
La Concepción or Santa María de Ayubale		Apalachee	1655–1704	
La Concepción de Atoyquime or Atoquime		Jororo	1693–1697	
La Encarnación a la Santa Cruz de Sábacola or Santa Cruz de Sábacola El Menor	_{30.80585, -84.87636}	Apalachicola	1674–1677	
La Natividad de Nuestra Señora de Tolomato (Likely the successor to Nuestra Señora de Guadalupe de Tolomato.)		St. Augustine	1620s–1702	
La Purificación de Tama or Nuestra Señora de Candelaria de Tama (Note: La Purificación served Yamassee people living in Apalachee Province.)	_{30.43251, -84.27395}	Apalachee	1675–1704	
Mission to the Calusa		Calusa	1697	
Nombre de Dios	_{29.90378, -81.31636}	St. Augustine	1566–1587	
Nuestra Señora de la Soledad y San Luís		Pensacola	1718–1740s	
Nuestra Señora de Guadalupe de Tolomato (Note: Some residents of the mission may have moved to La Natividad de Nuestra Señora de Tolomato near St. Augustine.)		Guale	1587–1597, 1605–?	
Ospo or Talapo		Guale	1595–1606	
"Our Lady of Guadaloupe" (on St. Joseph Bay) (Note: A short-lived Spanish lookout post on St. Joseph Bay had two churches, one for the Spanish, and one for Chacatos living in the area.)		Pensacola	1701–1704	
Palica		St. Augustine	Early 18th century	
San Antón de Carlos	_{26.42176, -81.86444}	Calusa	1567–1569	
San Antonio de Anacape/Enacape	_{29.4335, -81.65423}	Agua Dulce	1587–1655	
Señor San Antonio de Anacape/Enacape (Note: The second San Antonio mission served Yemasee people at the same site as the earlier Agua Dulce mission.)	_{29.4335, -81.65423}	St. Johns River	1680–1699	
San Antonio de Bacuqua	_{30.50709, -84.23808}	Apalachee	After 1657–1704	
San Antonio de los Chines		Apalachee	1694–1704	
San Antonio de Punta Rasa	_{30.45382, -87.099}	Pensacola	1749–1761	
San Augustín de Urihica		Northern Utina	1630-1657	
San Blás de Avino	_{29.29626, -81.9168}	Acuera	1612–1620s	
San Buenaventura de Guadalquini (moved to St. Johns River as Santa Cruz de Guadalquini)	_{31.13393, -81.39363}	Guale/Mocama	1606-1684	
San Buenaventura de Potano	_{29.49639, -82.2304}	Potano	1608–1613	
San Carlos de Borromeo (in Achercatane or Yatcatane)		Chacato	1674–1675	
San Carlos de los Chacatos (Note: San Carlos de Los Chacatos served Chacato people.)		Apalachee	1675–1683 or later	
San Carlos de Çabacola (Note: San Carlos de Çabacola served people from Sabacola and may have served Chacato people. The mission may have been near San Nicolás de Los Chatos.)		Apalachicola	before 1686-1690	
San Cosme y San Damián de Cupaica or Cupahica, Escambi, or Escabi (Note: Moved to San Damián de Ilcombe after 1686.)		Apalachee	1639–1704	
San Diego de Helaca/Laca, later moved to San Diego de Salamototo (on St. Johns River)	_{30.03227, -81.66331} (on St. Johns River as San Diego de Salamatoto)	Acuera	1645–1689	
San Diego de Satuache	_{31.89, -81.20083}	Guale	1616–1675	
San Felipe de Alabe (Note: San Felipe may have merged with San Pedro de Atulteca.)		Guale	1616–1655	
San Felipe (on Cumberland Island)		Mocama	1675–1678	
San Felipe (on Amelia Island)		Mocama	1689–1702	
San Francisco de Chuaquin		Arapaha	1655–1657	
San Francisco de Oconi (Note: The mission was in an Apalachee village with no connection to either the Timuqua Oconi or the Hitchiti Oconee.)		Apalachee	1655–1704	
San Francisco de Potano	_{29.72993, -82.44179}	Potano	1607–1706	
San Ildefonso de Chamini/Chamile		Arapaha	1655–1657	
San Joseph de Escambe or San José de Escambe	_{30.71891, -87.30174}	Pensacola	1741–1761	
San Joseph de Jororo	_{28.14541, -81.07598}	Jororo	1693–1679	
San Joseph de Ocuya or San José de Ocuya		Apalachee	1655–1704	
San Joseph de Sapala or San José de Zapala ( Sapelo Island)	_{31.51544, -81.24218}	Guale	1616–1684	
San Juan de Aspalaga		Apalachee	1655–1704	
San Juan (de) Guacara (on the Suwannee River)	_{30.1341, -83.13402}	Northern Utina	1612–1689	
San Juan del Puerto	_{30.42801, -81.42546}	Mocama	1587–1702	
San Julian		Agua Dulce	1598–1602	
San Lorenzo de Ibihica		Ibi	1612–1630	
San Lorenzo de Ivitachuco	_{30.34583, -83.87488}	Apalachee	1612(?)–1704	
San Luis de Acuera/Avino		Agua Dulce	1616–1655	
San Luis de Apalachee or San Luis de Talimali (Note: The mission was at Xinayca (also called Nixaxipa) until 1656.)	_{30.44865, -84.32005}	Apalachee	1633(?)–1704	
San Luis de Eloquale	_{29.23823, -81.96749}	Acuera	Unknown	
San Martín de Timucua/Ayacutu/Ayaocuto	_{29.95341, -82.77498}	Northern Utina	1610–1659	
San Martín de Tomole		Apalachee	1655–1704	
San Matheo de Tolapatafi		Yustaga	1656–1689	
San Miguel de Asile	_{30.34246, -83.82431}	Yustaga	1651–1689	
San Miguel de Potano		Potano	Unknown	
San Nicolás de Tolentino		Chacato	1674–1675	
San Nicolás de Los Chatos (Note: San Nicolás de Los Chatos served Chacato people. The mission may have been near San Carlos de Çabacola.)		Apalachicola	1689	
San Pedro de Atulteca or San Felipe de Athulteca (Note: The Atulteca mission had moved to Cumberland Island by 1675, then to Amelia Island by 1695.)		Guale	1616–1695	
San Pedro de Mocama (Cumberland Island)	_{30.75415, -81.47263}	Mocama	1587–1655(?)	
San Pedro de los Chines		Apalachee	1677(?)–1689(?)	
San Pedro de Medellin (Note: San Pedro served Chine people living in Apalachee Province.)		Apalachee	1681	
San Pedro y San Pablo de Patale (Note: The mission may have moved more than once.) or San Pedro de Patali	_{30.46661, -84.15007}	Apalachee	1655–1704	
San Pedro y San Pablo de Potohiriba or San Pedro de Potohiriba	_{30.36537, -83.48464}	Yustaga	1630–1705	
San Pedro y San Pablo de Puturiba(to)		Guale	1597(?)–1604(?)	
San Salvador de Mayaca		Mayaca	1655, 1680–1701	
San Sebastian		St. Augustine	1587–1601 or 1602	
Santa Ana de Potano (Note: Hann indicates that historical mentions of a mission at Santa Ana are unreliable.)		Potano	Uncertain	
Santa Catalina de Ajoica or Afuica, Ahoica, Ahojica, Nihoica, or Nihayca		Northern Utina	1655–1685	
Santa Catalina de Guale (St. Catherines Island, Sapelo Island and Amelia Island, in succession)	_{31.62534, -81.17348}	Guale	1595–1597, 1602–1702	
Santa Catalina or Santa María de Guale	30.57008, -81.45583	Mocama	1689–1702	
Santa Catarina de Guale		St. Augustine	1711–1717	
Santa Clara de Tupiqui (Sapelo River)		Guale	1595–1597	
Santa Clara de Tupiqui (Amelia Island)		Mocama	c. 1616	
Santa Cruz de Cachipile	_{30.66337, -83.20622}	Arapaha	1655–1657	
Santa Cruz de Guadalquini (Moved from San Buenaventura de Guadalquini)	_{30.44419, -81.46259}	Mocama	1684–1695	
Santa Cruz de Ytuchafun or Ychuntafun Capoli or Santa Cruz y San Pedro de Alcantara de Ychuntafun		Apalachee	1672–1704	
Santa Cruz de Tarihica		Northern Utina	1612–1695	
Santa Elena de Machaba		Yustaga	1655–1705	
Santa Fe de Toloca/Teleco/Toloco	_{29.92456, -82.50545}	Potano	1616–1702	
Santa Isabel de Utinahica		Unknown (Note: Santa Isabel was located somewhere in the southern part of the Altamaha River basin, northeast of the mission at Santa Cruz de Tarihica.)	1616	
Santa Lucia de Acuera	_{29.09504, -81.90663}	Acuera	1655	
Santa María de Bacuqua		Apalachee	1640–1657	
Santa María de Loreto		Tequesta	1743	
Santa María de los Angeles de Arapaha		Arapaha	1630–1657	
Santa María de los Yamasee or Santa María de Guale		Mocama	1675	
Santa Rosa de Ivitanayo		Yustaga	1680s	
Santiago de Oconi (near the Okefenokee Swamp)		Oconi	Early 16th century - 1655	
Santo Domingo de Asao (Note: Originally by the Altamaha River on the mainland, Santo Domingo moved to St. Simon's Island by 1675.) or Santo Domingo de Talaje (Note: Asao and Talafe were distinct towns that were later merged. Both names of the mission were used at various times.)	_{31.36433, -81.41751} _{(on the mainland)}	Guale	1595(?)–1680s	
Santo Domingo (Napa or Napoyca)		Mocama	1602	
Tequesta	_{25.77588, -80.1919}	Tequesta	1567–1570	
Tocoy		Aqua Dulce	1602–1606	
Tupiqui		Guale	1569–1570	

== See also ==
- Spanish missions in Georgia
- History of Florida
- Spanish Florida (La Florida)

== Sources ==
- Boyer, Willet A., III (March–June 2009). "Missions to the Acuera: An Analysis of the Historic and Archaeological Evidence for European Interaction With a Timucuan Chiefdom". The Florida Anthropologist. 62 (1–2): 45–56. ISSN 0015-3893 – via University of Florida Digital Collections.
- Boyer, Willet A., III (September 2017). "The Hutto/Martin Site of Marion County, Florida, 8MR3447: Studies at an Early Contact/Mission Site". The Florida Anthropologist. 70 (3): 122–139 – via University of Florida Digital Collections.
- Gannon, Michael V. (1983) [1965]. The Cross in the Sand (2nd ed.). Gainesville, Florida: University Presses of Florida. ISBN 978-0-8130-0776-2.
- Hann, John H. (April 1990). "Summary Guide to Spanish Florida Missions and Visitas. With Churches in the Sixteenth and Seventeenth Centuries". The Americas. 46 (4): 470–471. doi:10.2307/1006866. JSTOR 1006866. S2CID 147329347.
- Hann, John H. (1996a). A History of the Timucua Indians and Missions. Gainesville, Florida: University Presses of Florida. ISBN 978-0-8130-1424-1.
- Hann, John H. (2006). The Native American World Beyond Apalachee. University Press of Florida. ISBN 9-780-8130-2982-5.
- Milanich, Jerald T. (1995). Florida Indians and the Invasion from Europe. Gainesville, Florida: University Press of Florida. p. 82. ISBN 0-8130-1360-7.
- Milanich, Jerald (1999a). Laboring in the fields of the Lord: Spanish missions and Southeastern Indians. Washington: Smithsonian Institution Press. ISBN 1560989408.
- Saccente, Julie Rogers; White, Nancy Marie (2015). "Fort San José, a Remote Spanish Outpost in Northwest Florida, 1700–1721". In Funari, Pedro Paulo A.; Senatore, Maria Ximena (eds.). Archaeology of Culture Contact and Colonialism in Spanish and Portuguese America. Cham: Springer International Publishing. pp. 297–311. doi:10.1007/978-3-319-08069-7_16. ISBN 978-3-319-08069-7.
- "John Worth Faculty Homepage - PCF Project - Mission San Joseph de Escambe". pages.uwf.edu.
