= Saturiwa (chief) =

Chief of the Saturiwa tribe

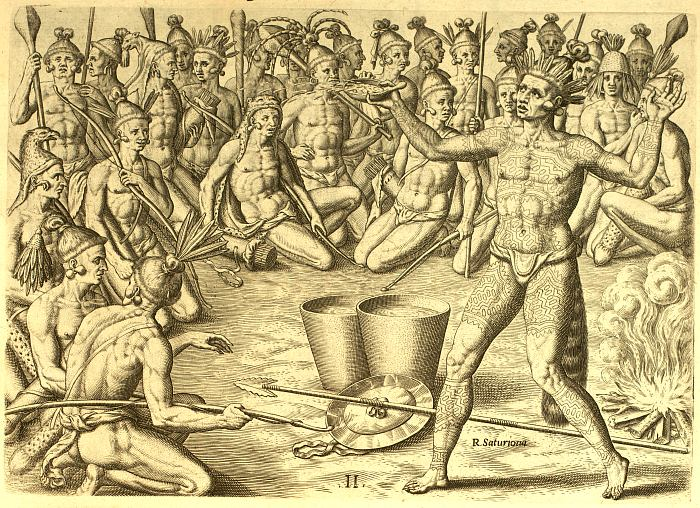
One of Theodor de Bry's engravings possibly based on LeMoyne's drawings, depicting Chief Saturiwa preparing his men for battle

Saturiwa (also spelled Saturioua, Satourioua and Saturiba, Timucua: Sa-tori-ba?) (fl. 1562 – 1565) was chief of the Saturiwa tribe, a Timucua chiefdom centered at the mouth of the St. Johns River in Florida, during the 16th century. His main village, also known as Saturiwa, was located on the south bank of the river near its mouth, and according to French sources he was sovereign over thirty other village chiefs. Chief Saturiwa was a prominent figure in the early days of European settlement in Florida, forging friendly relations with the French Huguenot settlers, who founded Fort Caroline in his territory.

== History ==
Chief Saturiwa led the Saturiwa chiefdom in what is now Jacksonville, Florida, when French Huguenots under Jean Ribault explored the area in 1562. His people came into direct contact with the French when Fort Caroline was built by René Goulaine de Laudonnière two years later. The largest and best attested of the Timucua subgroup known as the Mocama, the Saturiwa occupied an area from the mouth of the St. Johns towards what is now downtown Jacksonville, and up and down the adjacent Atlantic coast from St. Augustine north to the St. Marys River.

According to the French, Saturiwa was sovereign over thirty other villages and their chiefs, ten of whom were said to be his 'brothers'.

French sources also record the name of his son, Athore. Athore was also a chief of a village under his father Saturiwa. The Huguenots described Athore as handsome, prudent, and honorable. The Saturiwa chiefs practiced incestuous marriages to keep power within the family. Therefore, Saturiwa betrothed his eldest wife to their own son Athore, with whom she had many children. Though the Huguenots respected Athore, they were disgusted by his incestuous marriage to his own mother.

The powerful Saturiwa quickly forged an alliance with the French, hoping to secure their aid against his enemies, the Utina up river. However, Laudonnière reneged on his deal to help Saturiwa against the Utina, as he also wanted to pursue an alliance with them. Relations between the Saturiwa and the French soured for a time, but soon cordial relations were restored.

When the Spanish conquered Fort Caroline and ejected the French in 1565, Saturiwa and his people were hostile to the Spanish, who allied with the Utina. In 1567, Saturiwa joined a coalition with two other tribes, the Potano and the Mayaca, against the Utina and their Spanish allies. The following year Saturiwa and his ally, Chief Tacatacuru, joined the French soldier Dominique de Gourgue in an attack on Fort Caroline. It is not known when Saturiwa died, but his people remained hostile to the Spanish until well into the 1570s.

Saturiwa and his family are depicted in several of Theodor de Bry's engravings reputedly based on original drawings by Jacques le Moyne.
