= List of Spanish colonial missions of the Roman Catholic Church in the Americas =

This is a list of lists of Spanish missions in the Americas. The Spanish colonial government coordinated with the Roman Catholic Church to establish churches throughout their New World possessions.

- Jesuit missions in North America
- Spanish missions in Mexico
  - Spanish missions in Baja California
  - Franciscan Missions in the Sierra Gorda of Querétaro
  - Spanish missions in the Sonoran Desert
  - Franciscan missions to the Maya
  - Monasteries on the slopes of Popocatépetl
  - Mendicant monasteries in Mexico
- Spanish missions in Trinidad
- United States
  - Ajacán Mission
  - Spanish missions in Arizona
  - Spanish missions in California
  - Spanish missions in the Carolinas
  - Spanish missions in Florida
  - Spanish missions in Georgia
  - Spanish missions in Louisiana
  - Spanish missions in New Mexico
  - Spanish missions in Texas

Spanish missions in South America

- Jesuit reduction
- List of the Jesuit Missions of Chiquitos
- Circular Mission
- Córdoba
- Jesuit Missions of La Santísima Trinidad de Paraná and Jesús de Tavarangue
- Jesuit Missions of Moxos
- Mission of Nahuel Huapi
- Mission of Río Bueno
- Jesuit missions among the Guaraní
- Mainas missions
- Misiones Orientales

== See also ==
- Cargo system
- Mission Indians
- Reductions
  - Andes
  - Jesuit
