= San Lorenzo de Ibihica =

Spanish mission in Georgia (US state)

San Lorenzo de Ibihica was a Spanish Franciscan mission built in the early 17th century in the southeast of the present-day U.S. state of Georgia. It was part of Spain's effort to colonize the region of Spanish Florida and convert the Timucua to Catholicism. It served the Ibi people, also known as the Yui or Ibihica, a Timucua group of the area.

== History ==
Mission San Lorenzo was established at the main village of the Ibi, Ibihica. It was located in the Georgia interior 14 leagues (about 50 miles) from Mission San Pedro de Mocama on Cumberland Island. It probably stood east of the Okefenokee Swamp, near the Charlton-Camden county line, just north of the present border between Georgia and Florida and between St. Marys and Satilla Rivers.

Spanish missionary efforts among the Ibi began with the visit of the Franciscan Fray Pedro Ruíz in 1597. Ruíz had some success in converting the people and managed to secure the submission of the chief to Spanish authority, but he had to be recalled later that year due to the Guale Rebellion. The Ibi thus had no friar of their own, but were visited regularly by friars from Missions San Pedro de Mocama and San Juan del Puerto. After 1616 San Lorenzo de Ibihica was established to give the Ibi their own mission. It continued to operate until 1656, when the mission and town were evidently destroyed by the Spanish as a result of the Timucua Rebellion.

== See also ==
- Spanish missions in Florida
