= Icafui =

American indigenous people

- A map of the Timucua chiefdoms of mainland southeast Georgia, including the Icafui (orange).

Total population
- Extinct as tribe

Regions with significant populations
- Southeastern inland Georgia

Languages
- Timucua language, Itafi dialect

Religion
- Southeastern Ceremonial Complex, Christianity

Related ethnic groups
- Timucua

The Icafui (also Ycafui, Icafi, Ycafi) people were a Timucua people of southeastern Georgia, who were closely related if not synonymous with the Cascangue people. Exceptionally little is known about the Icafui, other than their general location and the fact that they spoke a dialect of Timucua called "Itafi" along with the Ibi.

The Icafui are described living on the mainland east of the Ibi, Yufera, and Oconi, which would correspond to a homeland on or not far inland from the Georgia coast between the mouths of the Satilla and Altamaha Rivers. This region is associated with Savannah-culture artifacts. Deagan specifically narrows this range to the mainland opposite to Jekyll Island, with a northern boundary in the vicinity of the Turtle River.

The villages of Xatalano, Heabono, Aytire, Lamale, Acahono, Tahupa, Punhuri, Talax, Panara, Utayne, and Huara are named as settlements "of the pine forests of the interior lands who are subjects of Doña Maria (of Tacatacuru on Cumberland Island)" which may have been affiliated with the Icafui, but could also have been Mocama.

During the Spanish colonial period, the Icafui did not receive a mission of their own, but interacted with Mocama missions such as San Pedro de Mocama. The tribe is not mentioned post 1604, and was likely destroyed or displaced by the Yamasee in the early 17th century.
