= Tacatacuru =

Total population
- Extinct as tribe

Regions with significant populations
- Cumberland Island and the adjacent coastal areas of the U.S. state of Georgia

Languages
- Timucua language, Mocama dialect

Religion
- Native

Related ethnic groups
- Timucua

Tacatacuru was a Timucua chiefdom located on Cumberland Island in what is now the U.S. state of Georgia in the 16th and 17th centuries. It was one of two chiefdoms of the Timucua subgroup known as the Mocama, who spoke the Mocama dialect of Timucuan and lived in the coastal areas of southeastern Georgia and northern Florida.

The Tacatacuru were among the first native tribes to meet French explorer Jean Ribault's expedition in 1562. They appear to have interacted amicably with the French when they people established Fort Caroline in present-day Jacksonville, Florida, in 1564. The Tacatacuru later became deeply involved in the Spanish mission system, and one of the first missions in Spanish Florida, San Pedro de Mocama, was established in their territory. Like other tribes in the area, they were greatly affected by Eurasian diseases and war with other peoples through the 17th century. By 1675, they had abandoned Cumberland Island and relocated south, where they merged with other Timucua peoples and lost their independent identity.

== Area ==
The Tacatacuru occupied Cumberland Island and the adjacent coastal areas of mainland Georgia. Their main village was located toward the southern end of the island. An archaeological site extending from the Dungeness mansion ruins northward along the shore has been identified as the probable location of Tacatacuru. Spanish records indicate there were at least seven other villages on the island and eleven more on the mainland. Other Mocama-speaking Timucua lived in the area, including the Saturiwa, who lived to the south around the mouth of the St. Johns River in what is now Jacksonville, Florida. To the east of the Tacatacuru on the mainland were speakers of the Yufera and Itafi dialects of Timucua; named tribes include the Ibi and the Cascangue or Icafui. The Guale people lived to the north.

== History ==
Cumberland Island and the surrounding area were inhabited for thousands of years by indigenous peoples who preceded the Tacatacuru; these early settlers often lived there in seasonal fishing camps. As did other Mocama peoples, the Tacatacuru participated in the Savannah archaeological culture.

The Tacatacuru met the French Huguenot expedition of Jean Ribault in 1562. The account by Ribault's lieutenant René Goulaine de Laudonnière records a meeting with the natives of the "Seine River" (now known as the St. Marys River) and their chief, though they do not mention any names from this time. The Tacatacuru met the French again when they returned under Laudonnière to establish the colony of Fort Caroline in 1564. The Chief Tacatacuru mentioned in French records from this time may be the earlier leader who met the initial expedition, or his successor.

The Tacatacuru seem to have maintained friendly relations with the French, as well as with the Saturiwa, in whose territory Fort Caroline was established. Spanish forces from St. Augustine destroyed the French outpost in 1565, after which the Tacatacuru, like the Saturiwa, were antagonistic toward them. Both groups were among those Native Americans who aided Dominique de Gourgue in his raid on the Spanish in 1567.

After the Tacatacuru made peace with the Spanish, the latter established a fort and a mission, San Pedro de Mocama, on Cumberland Island near the main Tacatacuru town. This was one of the earliest of the missions in Spanish Florida, as well as one of the most prominent; the church eventually built there was as large as that in St. Augustine. For a time, the garrison marked the northern extent of Spanish power, providing defense against the Guale. In the late 16th century the Tacatacuru chief, Don Juan, was a major supporter of cooperation with the Spanish, and joined them in pushing back the Guale in the revolt of 1597. Juan died three years later, and was succeeded by his niece, Doña Ana. Tacatacuru prominence continued in the early 17th century; in 1601 the Spanish noted that the Cascangue and the once-powerful Saturiwa were then vassals of the Tacatacuru.

San Pedro de Mocama was on the 1655 mission list, and the Tacatacuru do not appear to have taken part in the Timucua rebellion the following year. However, increased pressure from other tribes took its toll on the Tacatacuru, and all survivors abandoned Cumberland Island by 1675, relocating closer to St. Augustine. The island was subsequently occupied by the Yamasee. The remaining Tacatacuru were absorbed into other tribes in Florida and lost their independent identity.
