= Yufera people =

Timucua tribe

Yufera
- A map of the Timucua chiefdoms of mainland southeast Georgia, including the Yufera (yellow).

Total population
- Extinct as tribe

Regions with significant populations
- Southeastern inland Georgia

Languages
- Timucua language, Yufera dialect

Religion
- Native

Related ethnic groups
- Timucua

The Yufera were a Timucua people located in the present day US state of Georgia. They spoke a distinct dialect of Timucua. Little is known about the Yufera. They lived on or near the coast of Georgia near the mouths of the Satilla (called Iranaca by the Timucua) and St Marys Rivers. They likely participated in the Savannah or St Johns archaeological cultures.

In 1560, French explorer Rene de Laudonnière encountered the Yufera who were currently being ruled by Queen Cubicani following the death of her husband King Hioacaia. Cubicani supplied Laudonnière's men with food and cassina. Laudonnière described the Yufera province as wealthy and Cubicani as "the most beautiful of all Indians, and who they make the most account."

Yufera is listed among the towns that allied with French explorer Dominique de Gourgues against the Spanish in 1567. In the 17th century, Yufera was allied to the chiefdom of Tacatacuru on Cumberland Island and under the influence of the Spanish mission of San Pedro de Mocama, but appears to have retained independence. There are no mentions of the Yufera past 1610, suggesting that they may have been among the first Timucua groups to be destroyed by Anglo-Muskogee slave raids.
