= Spanish missions in Georgia =

Catholic religious outposts in Georgia

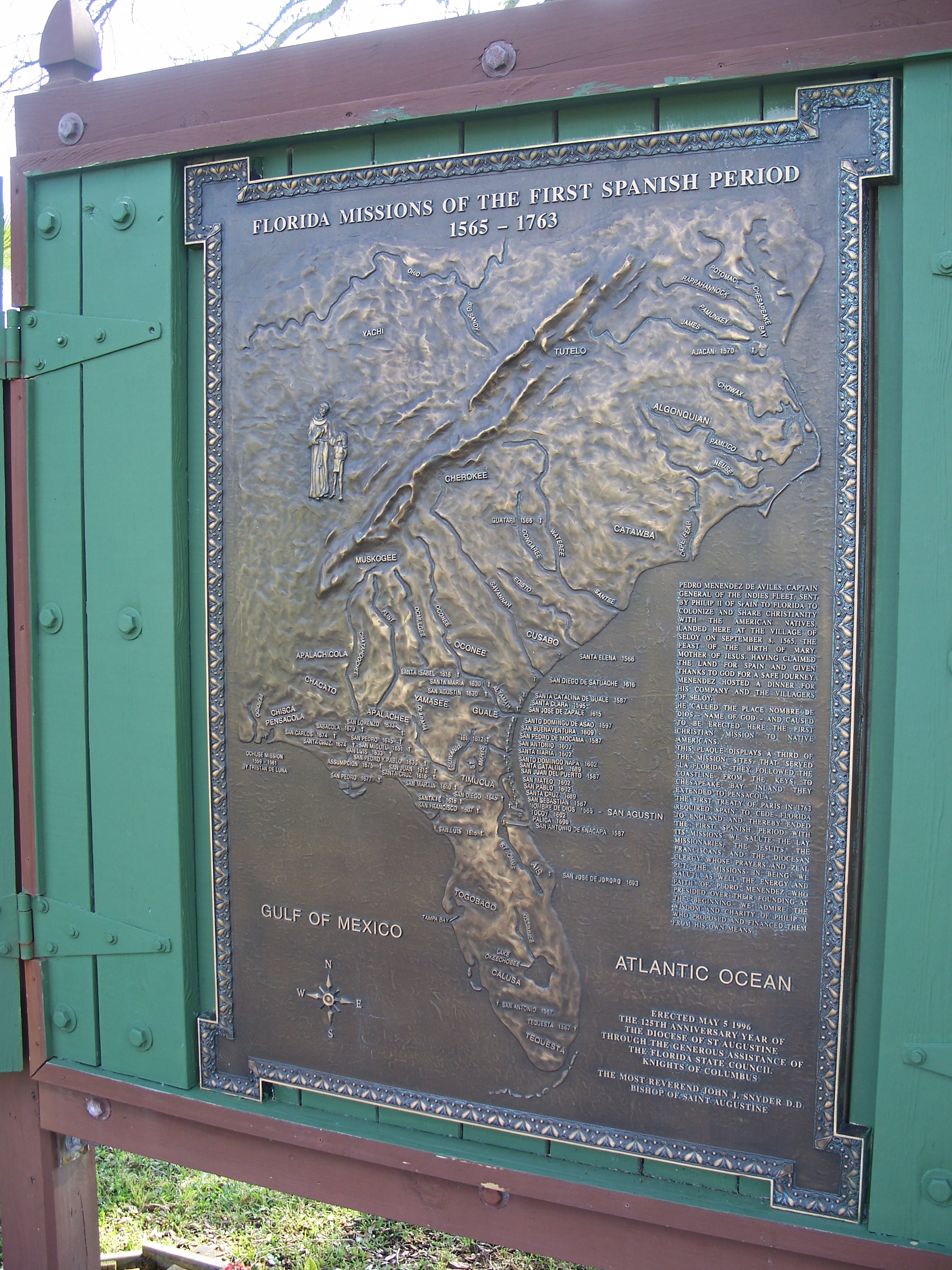
A plaque showing the locations of a third of the missions between 1565 and 1763

The Spanish missions in Georgia comprised a series of religious outposts established by Spanish Catholics in order to spread the Christian doctrine among the Guale and various Timucua peoples in what is now southeastern Georgia.

Beginning in the second half of the 16th century, the Kingdom of Spain established a number of missions throughout Spanish Florida in order to convert the Native Americans to Christianity, to facilitate control of the area, and to prevent its colonization by other countries, in particular, England and France. Spanish Florida originally included much of what is now the Southeastern United States, although Spain never exercised long-term effective control over more than the northern part of what is now the state of Florida from present-day St. Augustine to the area around Tallahassee, southeastern Georgia, and some coastal settlements, such as Pensacola, Florida. A few short-lived missions were established in other locations, including Mission Santa Elena in present-day South Carolina, around the Florida peninsula, and in the interior of Georgia and Alabama.

== Missions ==
This table includes doctrinas, missions that normally had one or more resident missionaries, but does not include visitas, which never had a resident missionary, and had less substantial church buildings where services were conducted by visiting missionaries.

Spanish missions in the present-day US state of Georgia
Mission Name	Location	Province or Region	Documentation of when missions were active is incomplete. Years listed in this column may not represent either the earliest or the latest year in which a mission was in use.	References
Espogache (Note: Place name. Mission name unknown.) (Note: Espogache, Tolomato, and Tupiqui were neighboring towns in Guale which seem to have merged, or to have hosted the mission of Nuestra Señora de Guadalupe in sequence.)		Guale	1605–?	
Guale	_{31.62534, -81.17348}	Guale	1568–1570	
Nuestra Señora de Guadalupe de Tolomato (Note: Some residents of the mission may have moved to La Natividad de Nuestra Señora de Tolomato near St. Augustine.)		Guale	1587–1597, 1605–?	
Ospo or Talapo		Guale	1595–1606	
San Augustín de Urihica		Northern Utina	1630-1657	
San Buenaventura de Guadalquini (moved to St. Johns River as Santa Cruz de Guadalquini)	_{31.13393, -81.39363}	Guale/Mocama	1606-1684	
San Diego de Satuache	_{31.89, -81.20083}	Guale	1616–1675	
San Felipe de Alabe (Note: San Felipe may have merged with San Pedro de Atulteca.)		Guale	1616–1655	
San Felipe (on Cumberland Island)		Mocama	1675–1678	
San Joseph de Sapala or San José de Zapala ( Sapelo Island)	_{31.51544, -81.24218}	Guale	1616–1684	
San Lorenzo de Ibihica		Ibi	1612–1630	
San Pedro de Atulteca or San Felipe de Athulteca (Note: The Atulteca mission had moved to Cumberland Island by 1675, then to Amelia Island by 1695.)		Guale	1616–1695	
San Pedro de Mocama (Cumberland Island)	_{30.75415, -81.47263}	Mocama	1587–1655(?)	
San Pedro y San Pablo de Puturiba(to)		Guale	1597(?)–1604(?)	
Santa Catalina de Guale (St. Catherines Island, Sapelo Island and Amelia Island, in succession)	_{31.62534, -81.17348} _{(on St. Catherines Island)}	Guale	1595–1597, 1602–1702	
Santa Clara de Tupiqui (Sapelo River)		Guale	1595–1597	
Santa Cruz de Cachipile	_{30.66337, -83.20622}	Arapaha	1655–1657	
Santa Isabel de Utinahica		Unknown (Note: Santa Isabel was located somewhere in the southern part of the Altamaha River basin, northeast of the mission at Santa Cruz de Tarihica.)	1616	
Santa María de los Angeles de Arapaha		Arapaha	1630–1657	
Santiago de Oconi (near the Okefenokee Swamp)		Oconi	Early 16th century - 1655	
Santo Domingo de Asao (Note: Originally by the Altamaha River on the mainland, Santo Domingo moved to St. Simon's Island by 1675.) or Santo Domingo de Talaje (Note: Asao and Talafe were distinct towns that were later merged. Both names of the mission were used at various times.)	_{31.36433, -81.41751} _{(on the mainland)}	Guale	1595(?)–1680s	
Tupiqui		Guale	1569–1570	

== See also ==
- History of Georgia
- Missions in Spanish Florida
- Viceroyalty of New Spain — Spanish colonial North America
- Spanish Louisiana — colonial region

== Sources ==
- Cassanello, Robert; Stapleton, Kevin (November 18, 2013). "Episode 07 Spanish Mission Bell". A History of Central Florida Podcast.
- Childers, Ronald Wayne (2004). "The Presidio System in Spanish Florida 1565-1763". Historical Archaeology. 38 (3): 24–32. doi:10.1007/BF03376651. JSTOR 25617178. S2CID 160809833.
- Hann, John H. (April 1990). "Summary Guide to Spanish Florida Missions and Visitas. With Churches in the Sixteenth and Seventeenth Centuries". The Americas. 46 (4): 470–471. doi:10.2307/1006866. JSTOR 1006866. S2CID 147329347.
- Hann, John H. (1996). A History of the Timucua Indians and Missions. Gainesville, Florida: University Press of Florida. pp. 6, 9. ISBN 0-8130-1424-7.
- Milanich, Jerald (1999). Laboring in the fields of the Lord: Spanish missions and Southeastern Indians. Washington: Smithsonian Institution Press. ISBN 1560989408.
