= San Joseph de Ocuya =

- U.S. National Register of Historic Places
- Location within Florida Location within the United States
- Location: Jefferson County, Florida
- Nearest city: Lloyd
- Coordinates: 30.48°N 84.02°W
- NRHP reference No.: 73000580
- Added to NRHP: May 7, 1973

San Joseph de Ocuya (also known as River Field Site) was a Spanish Franciscan mission built in the early 17th century in the Florida Panhandle, near the present-day town of Lloyd, Florida. It was part of Spain's effort to colonize the region, and convert the Timucuan and Apalachee Indians to Christianity. The mission lasted until the first decade of the 18th century, when it was destroyed, possibly by Creek Indians and the English.

The site where the mission stood was added to the U.S. National Register of Historic Places on May 7, 1973.

== See also ==
- Spanish missions in Florida
