= Oconi =

Native American Chiefdom in 17th century Georgia

The Oconi or Ocone were a Timucua people that spoke a dialect of the Timucua language. They lived in a chiefdom on the margin of or in the Okefenokee Swamp in southeastern Georgia. The Oconi first appeared in Spanish records in 1602, but a mission was not established until at least a decade later, with the first record of a mission in 1630. The Spanish twice attempted to relocate the Oconi people to other missions, in 1645 and 1655. The Oconi disappeared from Spanish records after 1655.

== Location ==
The Oconi chiefdom was described as being a two-day journey from the mission of San Pedro de Mocama on Cumberland Island (on the Georgia coast). As that distance does not fit in with the sequence of other missions along the Georgia coast, it has been assumed that Oconi was inland to the west of San Pedro. Later mentions of Oconi describe it as being on an island, or as "between two lakes". This, together with the distance from San Pedro de Mocama, has been interpreted to mean that Oconi was on the margin of or in the Okefenokee Swamp.

Little is known of the native population of southeastern Georgia in prehistory. Archaeological study of the region has been limited and the ceramic chronology is not well established, but the area as a whole appears to have been a "transitory zone" between the Savannah and St. Johns cultural regions. But the ceramic sequence at their Okefenokee settlements from early fiber-tempered wares through St. Johns and later San Pedro ceramics correspond with Mocama identity. Oconi's placement within San Pedro's jurisdiction and Tacatacuru's demonstrably authority over mainland communities is consistent with Oconi's incorporation into San Pedro, and potentially a subordinate or vassal relationship.

== Language ==
The people of Oconi spoke the Oconi dialect of the Timucua language. Francisco Pareja, a Franciscan friar who wrote a grammar and dictionary of the Timucua language, listed about 10 dialects of Timucua, including Oconi. Pareja mentioned only one difference in vocabulary between the Maritime or Mocama dialect he spoke and the Oconi dialect. Pareja described the Oconi, Potano, Cascangue, and Ibi people as all speaking the same language.

== Food ==
As was typical of the eastern Timucua, the Oconi were more oriented to exploiting the resources of wetlands rather than practicing agriculture. Some of the Oconi were full-time hunter-fisher-gatherers. The Oconi did not raise sufficient maize to last them throughout the year, and depended on wild roots for starch when their maize was used up. One such root was ache, an otherwise unidentified starchy root that grew in water. Described as similar to cassava, ache required a lot of work to harvest and process. Harvesting required using levers to pry the roots out of mudholes, while processing required grinding the roots into flour and repeatedly rinsing the flour with water. Ache has been identified as Zamia integrifolia (the koonti of the Seminoles) by some authors, but Hann notes that Zamia grows in dry, sandy soil, not in water.

== Missionization ==
Oconi was first mentioned in Spanish records in 1602, when Oconi's chief requested that a missionary be assigned to his chiefdom. Crosses were erected by the inhabitants of Oconi and neighboring towns. The people of Oconi and neighboring chiefdoms on the mainland made frequent visits to the mission at San Pedro de Mocama, where they had relatives and friends. The mission of Santiago de Oconi was founded before 1630, possibly between 1613 and 1616.

== Later history ==
In 1645, the governor of Spanish Florida, Benito Ruiz de Salazar Vallecilla, ordered the relocation of the people living at the "Laguna de Oconi" to the mission of San Diego de Helaca (also "Elaca" or "Laca") on the St. Johns River. Salazar stated that fugitives from Timucua Province (Northern Utina) and "other places" had gathered at Oconi to avoid work. The San Diego de Helaca mission supported a ferry service across the St. Johns River, an important link on the trail connecting St. Augustine with Apalachee Province and other western missions. The mission had lost population, and the relocation of people from Oconi was intended to bolster the population of the mission so that the ferry service could be maintained. Spanish records do not record the outcome of Salazar's order, but excavation of the Rollestown site in East Palatka, Florida, the presumed site of the San Diego mission, revealed a stratum containing ceramics comparable to those of southeastern Georgia overlying a stratum containing St. Johns culture ceramics. This suggests that the original inhabitants of the area were replaced by people from southeastern Georgia, consistent with the move ordered by Salazar. Another indicator of a change is that "Salamototo" replaced "Helaca" as the name of the place sometime between 1655 and 1675.

Santiago de Oconi still had a resident missionary in 1655. That year, the new governor of Spanish Florida, Diego de Rebolledo, ordered the relocation of the inhabitants of Santiago de Oconi and nearby villages to Nombre de Dios, a mission adjacent to St. Augustine, which had a much reduced population. The people to be moved were described as fugitives from the mission at San Pedro de Mocama. The Oconi chief requested a delay in the move to allow the people to harvest their crops. Instead, the chief was imprisoned and troops were sent to burn the village and force the people to move. The people of Oconi fled to the woods or returned to San Pedro de Mocama. There is no further record of Oconi in Spanish records.

== Sources ==
- Hann, John H. (1996). A History of the Timucua Indians and Missions. Gainesville, Florida: University Press of Florida. ISBN 978-0-8130-1424-1.
- Milanich, Jerald T. (1978). "The Western Timucua: Patterns of Acculturation and Change". In Milanich, Jerald T.; Proctor, Samuel (eds.). Tacachale: Essays on the Indians of Florida and Southeastern Georgia during the Historic Period. Gainesville: The University Presses of Florida. pp. 59–88. ISBN 0-8130-0535-3.
- Milanich, Jerald T. (1999). Laboring in the Fields of the Lord. New York: Smithsonian Institution. ISBN 978-1-56098-940-0.
- Worth, John E. (1998). Timucua Chiefdoms of Spanish Florida. Volume 2: Resistance and Destruction. University Press of Florida. ISBN 0-8130-1574-X.
