= Ibi people =

Timucua chiefdom in Spanish Florida

Ibi (Yui)
- A map of the Timucua chiefdoms of mainland southeast Georgia, including the Ibi (vermilion).

Total population
- Extinct as tribe

Regions with significant populations
- Southeastern inland Georgia

Languages
- Timucua language, Itafi dialect

Religion
- Native

Related ethnic groups
- Timucua

The Ibi, also known as the Yui or Ibihica, were a Timucua chiefdom in the present-day U.S. state of Georgia during the 16th and 17th centuries. They lived in southeastern Georgia, about 50 miles from the coast. Like their neighbors, the Icafui (or Cascange) tribe, they spoke a dialect of the Timucua language called Itafi.

The chief's main village was Ibihica, and he controlled four other villages in the area. The Ibi first encountered Spanish friars in 1597, and soon became integrated into the Spanish mission system. A mission, San Lorenzo de Ibihica, was founded after 1616. The town and mission may have disappeared after 1630, or may have been destroyed by the Spanish following the Timucua Rebellion of 1656, and the people relocated. Surviving Ibi may have merged with other Timucua groups or moved beyond the Spanish sphere of influence.

== Name ==
The Ibi are also known as the Yui, though this appears to be a manuscript error: the letter u has been substituted for v, which is pronounced as, and often substituted for, b in contemporary Spanish. As such the correct spelling would be Yvi or Ybi, standardized to Ibi, a Timucuan word generally referring to water. Anthropologist John Worth prefers referring to them as the Ibihica, the name of their main village where their mission was located. The name of the town also appears in Spanish records as "Ibiica". The suffix -hica is Timucuan for "village".

== History ==
Little is known of the native population of southern Georgia in prehistory. Archaeological study of the region has been limited and the ceramic chronology is not well established, but the area as a whole appears to have been a "transitory zone" between the Savannah and St. Johns culture regions. Archaeological sites on the eastern margin of the Okefenokee Swamp probably include Ibi settlements.

The Ibi first enter the historical record during the Spanish mission era, at which time they were noted as living on the Georgia mainland 14 leagues (about 50 miles) from Mission San Pedro de Mocama, the mission to the Tacatacuru chiefdom on Cumberland Island. The Ibi numbered between 700 and 800 people in 1602 living in five villages under one chief, whose main village was known as Ibihica. They spoke a dialect of the Timucua language known as Itafi or Icafui, which was also spoken by their neighbors, the Icafui (also known as the Cascangue) tribe. Farther west, perhaps on the east side of the Okefenokee Swamp, were another Timucua group, the Oconi. The political organization was probably a simple chiefdom, not subject to any of the neighboring chiefdoms. (The Oconi chiefdom may have gained some authority over the Ibi chiefdom during the mission period.)

== Missionization ==
The Ibi became involved in the Spanish mission system relatively early. They were visited by the Franciscan Fray Pedro Ruíz in 1597, and later that year their chief traveled with ten companions to the Spanish colonial capital of St. Augustine to render obedience to the Spanish king. He was presented with gifts including a fine white blanket and a common blanket, and his party was provided with food for their return trip. However, the 1597 revolt of the Guale tribe, who lived farther north on the Georgia coast, caused Ruíz to be recalled. Still, the Ibi and the neighboring Oconi were visited with some regularity by friars from the nearby missions of San Pedro de Mocama and San Juan del Puerto. These visits were evangelically successful, but affected the local population, as by 1603 the Spanish noted that some Ibi were "leaving their towns" and relocating to the coastal missions.

After 1616 the Ibi were given their own mission, San Lorenzo de Ibihica, established in the main town. (Hann suggests that the mission was founded c. 1612, perhaps named in honor of the Franciscan provincial superior at that time, Lorenzo Martínez.) Worth states that the town and mission continued to exist until 1656, the year of the Timucua Rebellion against the Spanish government. At this time both Ibihica and nearby Oconi village were apparently destroyed by the Spanish. Surviving Ibi appear to have merged into other communities or moved outside the sphere of the Spanish colonial government. Hann states that the Spanish tried to relocate inhabitants of the Santiago de Oconi mission to Mission Nombre de Dios in 1655, eventually burning the Oconi town to force them to move. Most of the people of Oconi fled to the woods and never returned to their homes or to Spanish control. Hann also states that the mission of San Lorenzo de Ibihica was not mentioned in Spanish documents after 1630.
