= San Juan del Puerto, Florida =

Spanish mission in Florida

San Juan del Puerto
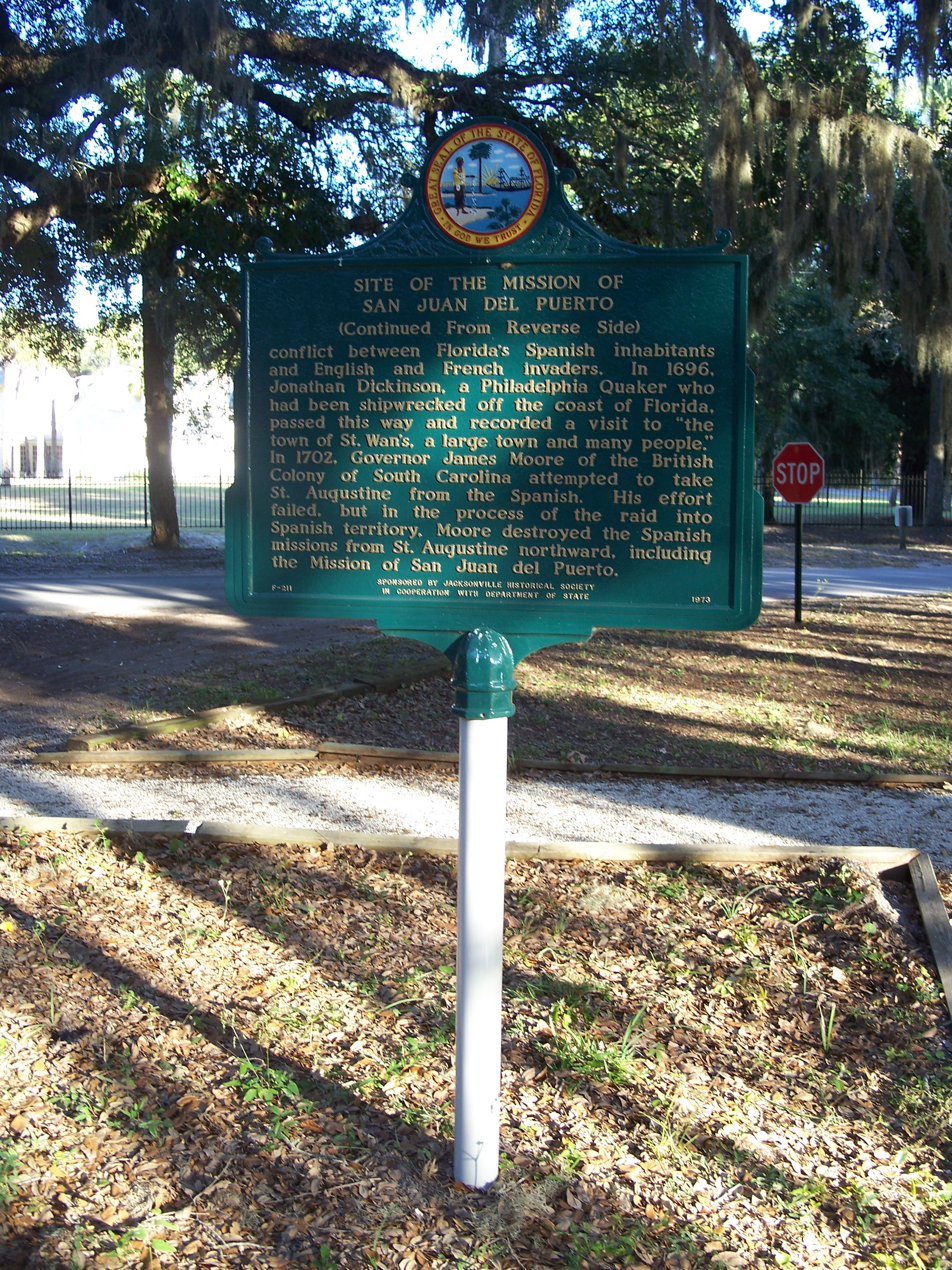
- Historical marker about the mission

- Location within Florida Location within the United States
- 30°25′40″N 81°25′33″W
- Location: Duval County, Florida, USA

San Juan del Puerto was a Spanish Franciscan mission founded before 1587 on Fort George Island, near the mouth of the St. Johns River in what is now Jacksonville, Florida. It was founded to serve the Saturiwa, a Timucua tribe who lived around the mouth of the St. Johns. It was organized by separating them into nine smaller villages. It has an important place in the study of the Timucua, as the place where Francisco Pareja undertook his work on the Timucua language.

== History ==
The Saturiwa were one of the chiefdoms of the Mocama, the Timucua-speaking people who lived in the coastal areas of what is now northern Florida and southeastern Georgia. The Saturiwa were allied with the French of Fort Caroline, and were thus initially hostile to the Spanish – who ousted the French colonists from the Florida coast in 1565. However, the Saturiwa soon made peace with the Spaniards, and Misión San Juan was founded near their main town on Fort George Island prior to 1587.

This became one of the three principal missions in what the Spanish called the Mocama Province, together with San Pedro de Mocama (to the Tacatacuru) on Cumberland Island and Santa Maria de Sena between them on Amelia Island.

Father Francisco Pareja worked at this mission and at San Pedro de Mocama. He devised a system of writing for Timucuan and taught some of the Mocama. In 1612, he printed a catechism in Spanish and Timucua, the first book printed in an indigenous language of the Americas.

After 1650, Guale refugees from the next chiefdom to the north along the (present-day) Georgia coast were settled at the mission.

The Spanish abandoned the mission around 1702, partly in response to raids from Native Americans and allied English colonists from South Carolina during Queen Anne's War.

== See also ==
- Spanish missions in Florida
- St. Johns County - history
- St. Johns River
