= Mocama =

Indigenous people of Florida and Georgia, US

Total population
- Extinct as tribe

Regions with significant populations
- North Florida and southeastern Georgia

Languages
- Mocama dialect of the Timucua language

Religion
- Native

Related ethnic groups
- Timucua

The Mocama were a Native American people who lived in the coastal areas of what are now northern Florida and southeastern Georgia. A Timucua group, they spoke the dialect known as Mocama, the best-attested dialect of the Timucua language. Their heartland extended from about the Altamaha River in Georgia to south of the mouth of the St. John's River, covering the Sea Islands and the inland waterways, Intracoastal. and much of present-day Jacksonville. At the time of contact with Europeans, there were two major chiefdoms among the Mocama, the Saturiwa and the Tacatacuru, each of which evidently had authority over multiple villages. The Saturiwa controlled chiefdoms stretching to modern day St. Augustine, but the native peoples of these chiefdoms have been identified by Pareja as speaking Agua Salada, which may have been a distinct dialect.

The Spanish came to refer to the entire area as the Mocama Province, and incorporated it into their mission system. The Mocama Province was severely depopulated in the 17th century by infectious disease and warfare with other Indian tribes and the English colonies to the north. Surviving Mocama refugees relocated to St. Augustine. Together with Guale survivors, 89 "mission Indians" evacuated with the Spanish to Cuba in 1763, after they ceded the territory to Great Britain.

== Terminology ==
The Mocama spoke a namesake dialect of Timucua, the most well attested form of the language. Mocama literally translates to "the sea" or "of the sea" (Timucua: moca ("sea") + -ma ("the" or "of")). Some modern writings employ the term Mocamo; however, linguist Julian Granberry asserts this spelling to be erroneous, being neither present in historical writings nor grammatically possible in Timucua.

== History ==
Archaeological research dates human habitation in the area eventually known as the Mocama Province to at least 2500 BC. The area has yielded some of the oldest known pottery from what is now the United States, uncovered by a University of North Florida team on Black Hammock Island in Jacksonville, Florida's Timucuan Ecological and Historic Preserve. The team also excavated more recent artifacts contemporary with the Mocama chiefdoms and some that indicate a Spanish mission. Around AD 1000 peoples of the area were engaged in long-distance trading with Mississippian culture centers, including Cahokia (in present-day Illinois) and Macon, Georgia. Before and during European contact, the peoples of the region spoke the Mocama dialect of the Timucua language and participated in similar cultures, for instance in their use of distinctive grog-tempered pottery known as San Pedro pottery.

The Mocama dialect is the best attested dialect of the Timucua language. Some scholars, including Jerald T. Milanich and Edgar H. Sturtevant, consider the dialect known as Agua Salada, spoken in an unspecified stretch of the Florida coast south of the Mocama Province, to be identical. However, other evidence suggests that Agua Salada was distinct, and more closely related to the western dialects like Potano than to Mocama.

The French Huguenot explorers, who first arrived in Florida in 1562, recorded two major chiefdoms in the Mocama region at that time, the Saturiwa and the Tacatacuru. The Saturiwa, whose main village was on Fort George Island, were friendly towards the French and aided them in establishing Fort Caroline in their territory. Huguenot leader René Goulaine de Laudonnière records that their chief, who was known as Saturiwa, had sovereignty over thirty villages and their chiefs, ten of whom were his "brothers". These villages were located around the mouth of the St. Johns River and nearby inland waterways. Other Mocama-speaking groups lived in the coastal areas to the north, from Amelia Island in Florida to St. Simons Island in Georgia. The Tacatacuru chiefdom was centered on Cumberland Island and evidently controlled villages on the coast.

When the Spanish destroyed the French stronghold of Fort Caroline, both the Saturiwa and the Tacatacuru aided the French and opposed the Spanish, but they eventually made peace. As Mocama was spoken across the area, the Spanish came to refer to it as the Mocama Province, and incorporated it into their mission system. It was one of the four provinces that made up the bulk of the Spanish mission effort in the region, the others being the Timucua Province (covering the Timucua groups to the west of the St. Johns River), the Guale Province, and the Apalachee Province. The Spanish founded three major missions in the Mocama Province: San Juan del Puerto at Saturiwa on Fort George Island, San Pedro de Mocama at Tacatacuru on Cumberland Island, and Santa Maria de Sena between them on Amelia Island.

Due to severe population losses from infectious disease and warfare with northern Indian tribes and the English from South Carolina, the Mocama polity disintegrated in the 17th century. After that, the Spanish and later settlers used the term "Mocama" to refer to the land where the chiefdoms had been. Between 1675 and 1680, the Westo tribe, backed by the English colonies of South Carolina and Virginia, along with attacks by English-supported pirates, destroyed the Spanish mission system in Mocama.

The few remaining "refugee missions" were destroyed by South Carolina's invasion of Spanish Florida in 1702 during Queen Anne's War. By 1733, the Mocama and Guale chiefdoms had become too depopulated and helpless to resist James Oglethorpe's founding of the English colony of Georgia.

In their colonial period, the Spanish established a missionary province at the Guale chiefdom just north of Mocama, on the Georgia coast between the Altamaha River and the Savannah River. Its history was similar to that of Mocama, and its fate was the same. Remnants of both chiefdoms retreated south to St. Augustine. In 1763, their descendants were among the 89 "mission Indians" evacuated to Cuba with the Spanish.

== See also ==
- San Pedro de Mocama
- Spanish missions in Georgia
- Spanish missions in Florida
