= Fort Caroline =

Attempted French colonial settlement in Florida

Fort Caroline National Memorial
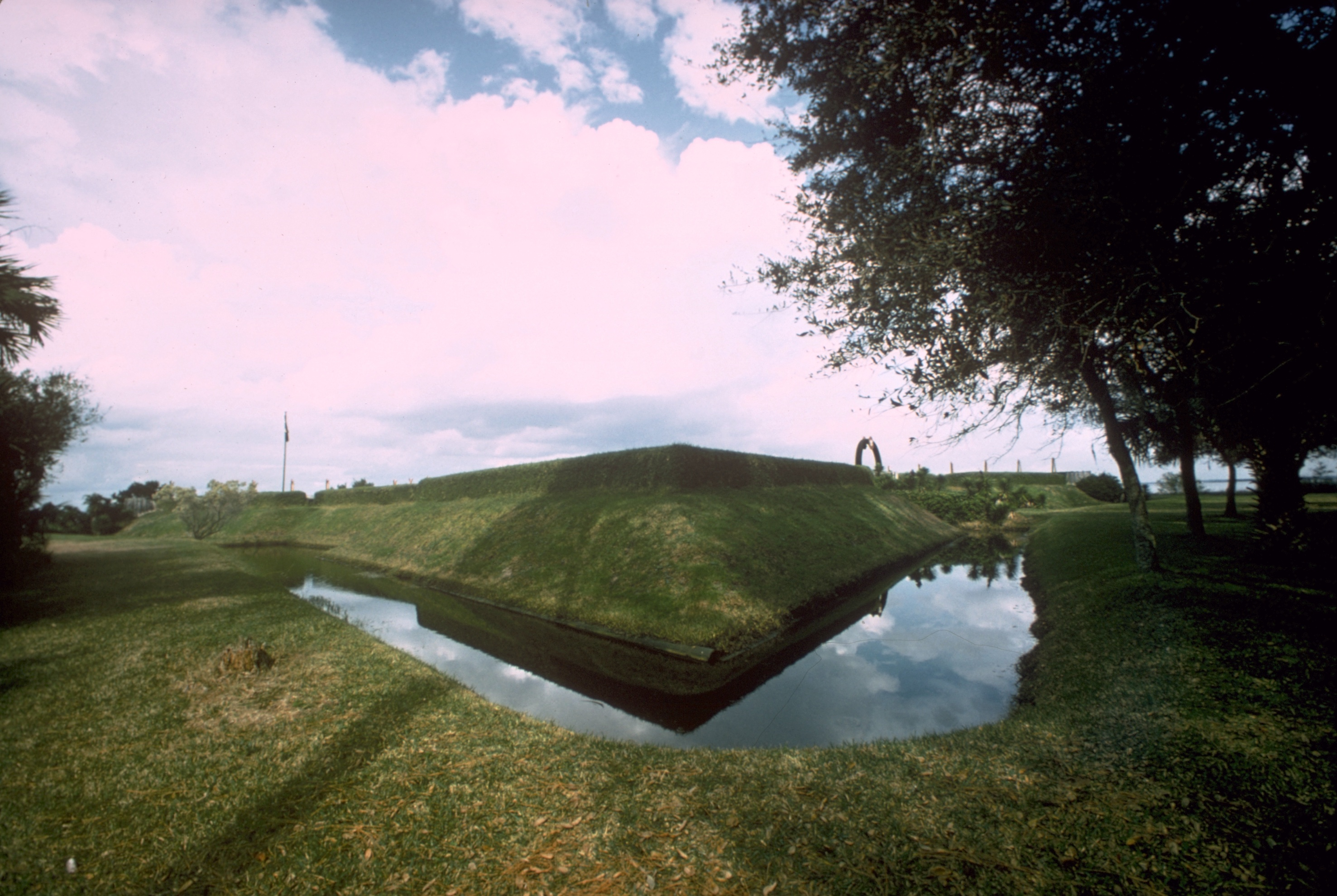
- Interactive map of Fort Caroline National Memorial
- Location: Arlington, Jacksonville, Florida, United States
- Coordinates: 30°23′13″N 81°30′2″W
- Area: 138.39 acres (56.00 ha)
- Established: 16 January 1953
- Visitors: 369,183 (in 2025)
- Governing body: National Park Service
- Website: Fort Caroline National Memorial
- Fort Caroline National Memorial
- U.S. National Register of Historic Places
- U.S. Historic district
- U.S. National Memorial
- Location within Florida Location within the United States
- Nearest city: Jacksonville, Florida
- Area: 128 acres (51.8 ha)
- Built: 1564
- NRHP reference No.: 66000061
- Added to NRHP: 15 October 1966

Fort Caroline was an attempted French colonial settlement in Florida, located on the banks of the St. Johns River in present-day Duval County. It was established under the leadership of René Goulaine de Laudonnière on 22 June 1564, following King Charles IX's enlisting of Jean Ribault and his Huguenot settlers to stake a claim in French Florida ahead of Spain. The French colony came into conflict with the Spanish, who established St. Augustine on 8 September 1565, and Fort Caroline was sacked by Spanish troops under Pedro Menéndez de Avilés on 20 September. The Spanish continued to occupy the site as San Mateo until 1569.

The exact site of the former fort is unknown. In 1953 the National Park Service established the Fort Caroline National Memorial along the southern bank of the St. John's River near the point that commemorates Laudonnière's first landing. This is generally accepted by scholars as being in the vicinity of the original fort, though probably not the exact location. The memorial is now managed as a part of the Timucuan Ecological and Historic Preserve, but it is also a distinct unit under administration of the National Park Service.

== History ==
=== Charlesfort (1562–1563, 1577–1578) ===
A French expedition, organized by Protestant leader Admiral Gaspard de Coligny and led by the French Explorer Jean Ribault, had landed at the site on the May River (now the St. Johns River) in May 1562. Here Ribault encountered the Timucuans led by Chief Saturiwa. At the time of first contact with Europeans, the Timucuan people inhabited near 19,000 square miles across north Florida and south Georgia, with an estimated population of near 200,000. Ribault took some 28 troops north along the coast, where on present-day Parris Island, South Carolina they developed a settlement known as Charlesfort. Ribault returned to Europe to arrange supplies for the new colony. When he was captured and briefly imprisoned in England on suspicion of spying related to the French Wars of Religion, he was prevented from returning to Florida.

After a year without supplies or leadership, and beset by hostility from the native populations, all but one of the colonists left Charlesfort to sail back to Europe. During their voyage in an open boat, they were reduced to cannibalism before the survivors were rescued in English waters. Another French force reestablished a fort at the site in 1577–1578.

=== Fort Caroline (1564–1565) ===
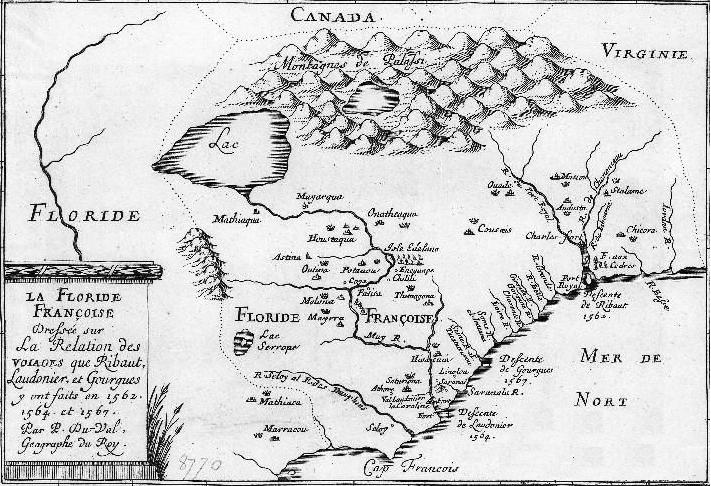
Floride françoise ("French Florida"), by Pierre du Val, 17th century

Meanwhile, René Goulaine de Laudonnière, who had been Ribault's second-in-command on the 1562 expedition, led a contingent of around 200 new settlers back to Florida, where they founded Fort Caroline (or Fort de la Caroline) on 22 June, 1564; the site was on a small plain formed by the western slope of the high steep bank later called St. Johns Bluff. The fort was named for King Charles IX of France. For just over a year, this settlement was beset by hunger and desertion, and attracted the attention of Spanish authorities who considered it a challenge to their control over the area.

The French colonists "had to rely heavily on the Indians" for both food and trade. The Timucua welcomed them. French soldiers also traveled across Timucuan territory, encountering the Yustaga people and unsuccessfully seeking gold and silver mines. Timucua chief Outina twice "coaxed the French into participating in attacks on villages of his rival, [the] Potano, to seize surplus corn." French soldiers who deserted from the fort raided Timucua settlements, souring relations with them. In spring 1565, Outina rebuffed a third request for food and was taken hostage by the French, provoking open confrontation with the Timucua that included "two tense weeks of skirmishes and one all-out battle." The French relented and released Outina.

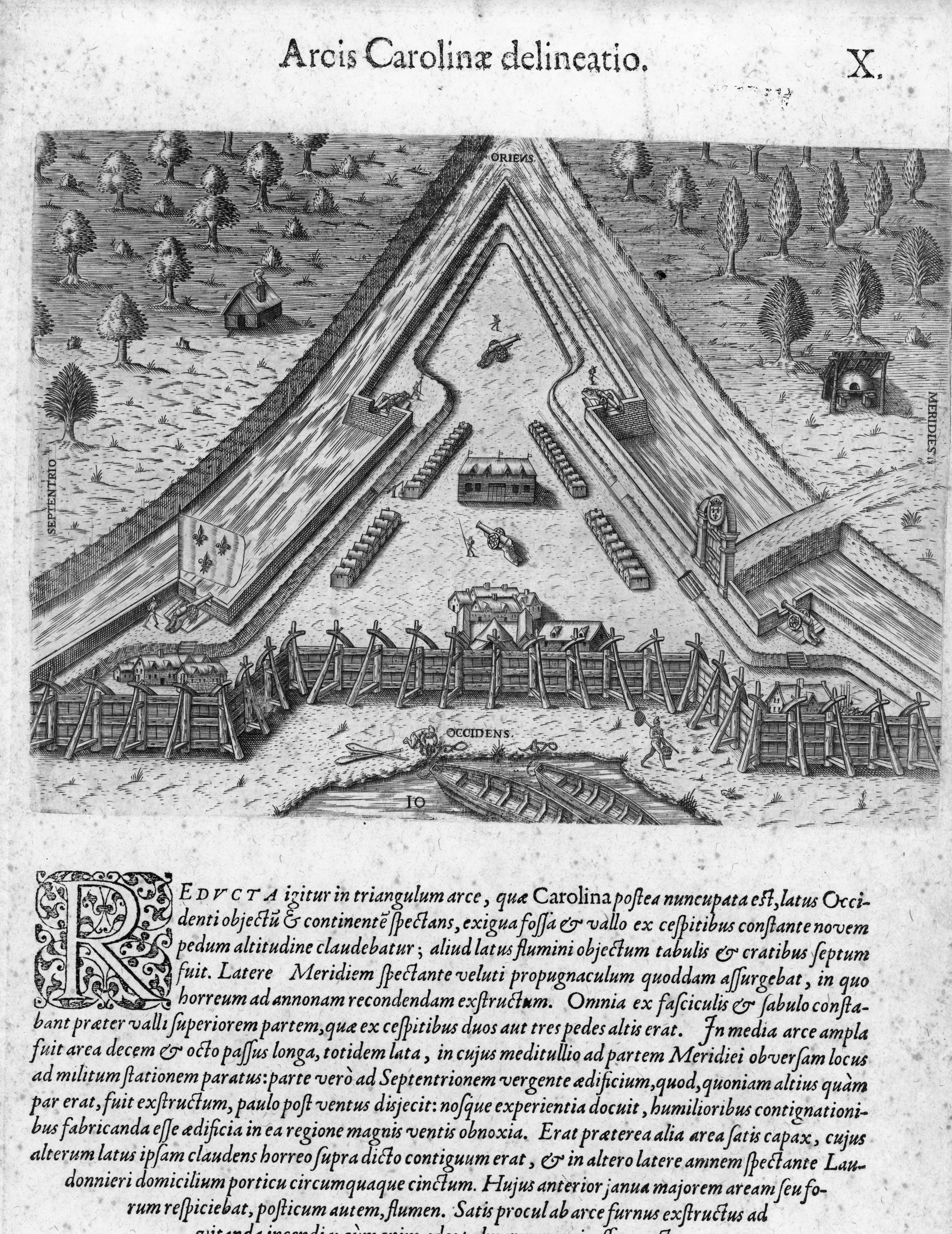
Fort Caroline shown in an old etching

On 20 July, 1565, the English adventurer John Hawkins arrived at the fort with his fleet looking for fresh water; there he exchanged his smallest ship for four cannons and a supply of powder and shot. The ship and provisions gained from Hawkins enabled the French to survive and prepare to move back to France as soon as possible. As Laudonnière writes: "I may saye that wee receaved as manye courtesies of the Generall, as it was possible to receive of any man living. Wherein doubtlesse hee hath wonne the reputation of a good and charitable man, deserving to be esteemed as much of us all as if hee had saved all our lives." The French introduced Hawkins to tobacco, which they all were using, and in turn he introduced it to England upon his return.

In late August, Ribault, who had been released from English custody in June 1565 and sent by Coligny back to Florida, arrived at Fort Caroline with a large fleet and hundreds of soldiers and settlers, taking command of the colony. However, the recently appointed Spanish Governor of Florida, Don Pedro Menéndez de Avilés, had simultaneously been dispatched from Spain with orders to remove the French outpost, and arrived within days of Ribault's landing. After a brief skirmish between Ribault's ships and Menéndez's ships, the latter retreated 35 miles (56 km) southward, where they established the settlement of St. Augustine. Ribault pursued the Spanish with several of his ships and most of his troops, but he was surprised at sea by a violent storm lasting several days. Meanwhile, Menéndez launched an assault on Fort Caroline by marching his forces overland during the storm, leading a surprise dawn attack on Fort Caroline on 20 September. At this time, the garrison contained 200 to 250 people. The only survivors were about 50 women and children who were taken prisoner and a few defenders, including Laudonnière, who managed to escape; the rest were massacred.

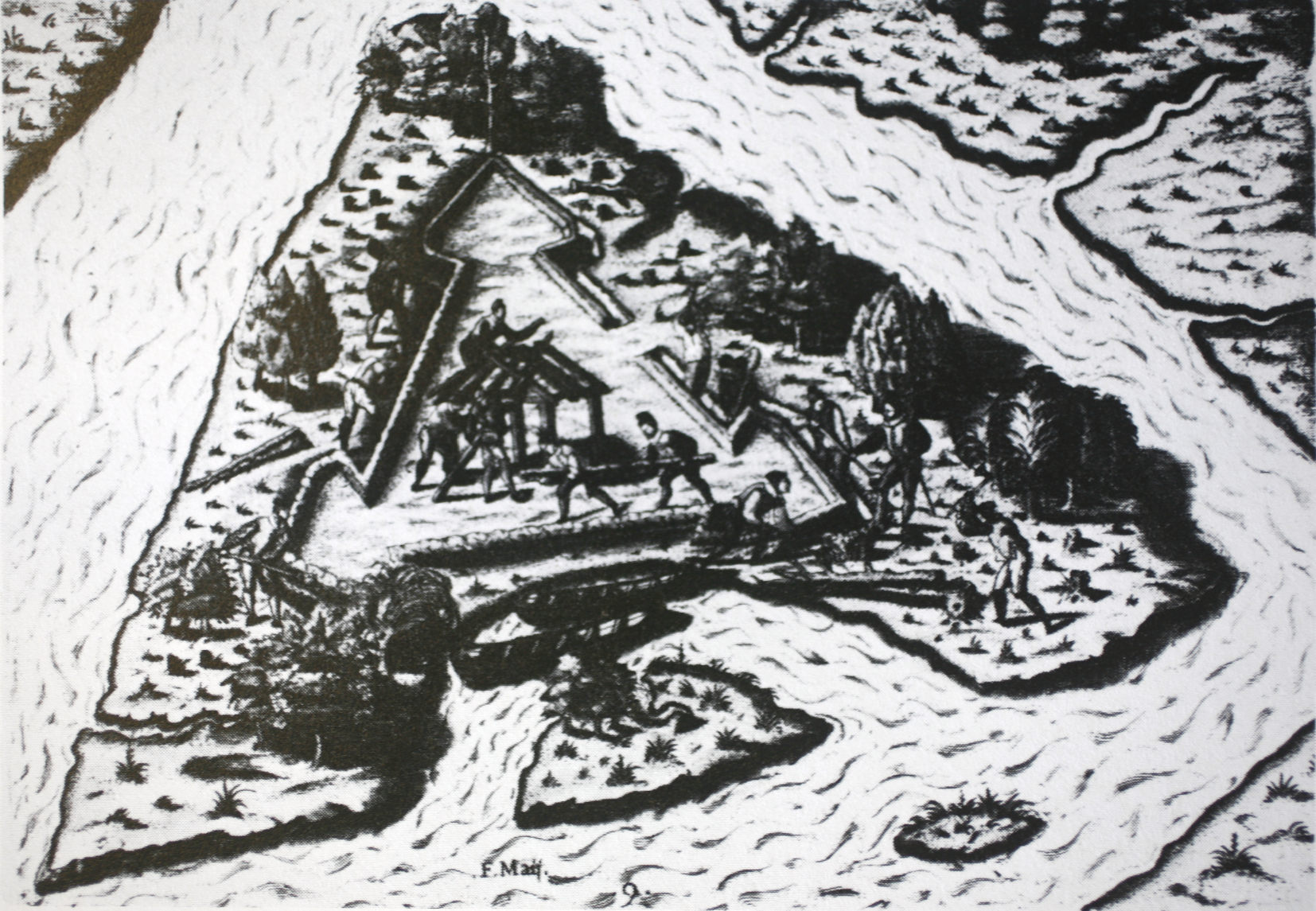
Founding of Fort Caroline depicted in Histoire de la Marine, de la voile à l'atome by Philippe Masson

As for Ribault's fleet, all of the ships either sank or ran aground south of St. Augustine during the storm, and many of the Frenchmen on board were lost at sea. Ribault and his marooned sailors marched northwards and were eventually located by Menéndez with his troops and summoned to surrender. Apparently believing that his men would be well treated, Ribault capitulated. Menéndez then executed Ribault and several hundred Huguenots (Francisco López de Mendoza Grajales, chaplain to the Spanish forces, identifies them as "all Lutherans" and dates their execution 29 September 1565, St. Michael's Day) as heretics at what is now known as the Matanzas Inlet. (Matanzas is Spanish for "slaughters".) The atrocity shocked Europeans even in that bloody era of religious strife. A fort built much later, Fort Matanzas, is in the vicinity of the site. This massacre ended France's attempts at colonization of the southeastern Atlantic coast of North America until 1577–1578 when Nicholas Strozzi and his crew built a fort after their ship, Le Prince, was wrecked at Port Royal Sound.

The Spanish destroyed Fort Caroline and built their own fort on the same site. In April 1568, Dominique de Gourgues led a French force which attacked, captured and burned the fort. He then slaughtered the Spanish prisoners in revenge for the 1565 massacre. The Spanish rebuilt, but permanently abandoned the fort the following year. The exact location of the fort is not known.

== Free Black population at Fort Caroline ==
When the Spanish conquistador Pedro Menéndez, who had black crew members in his fleet, founded St. Augustine in 1565, he wrote that his settlers had been preceded by free Africans in the French settlement at Fort Caroline. The fort also employed Black slave labor. Together, Fort Caroline and the St. Augustine area represent some of the earliest points of history for the Black (and Black Catholic) community of what would become the United States.

== Reproductions of Fort Caroline and speculation ==
The original site of Fort de la Caroline has never been determined, but it is believed to have been located near the present-day Fort Caroline National Memorial. The National Park Service constructed an outdoor exhibit of the original fort in 1964, but it was destroyed by Hurricane Dora in the same year. Today, the second replica, a near full-scale "interpretive model" of the original Fort de la Caroline, also constructed and maintained by the National Park Service, illustrates the modest defenses upon which the 16th-century French colonists depended.

In 2025, it was announced that the replica fort would be demolished due to flooding issues. The replica fort would be rebuilt in a more upland location.

== Proposed alternative location ==
On 21 February 2014, researchers Fletcher Crowe and Anita Spring presented claims at a conference hosted by Florida State University that Fort Caroline was located not on the St. Johns River, but on the Altamaha River in southeast Georgia. The scholars proposed that period French maps, particularly a 1685 map of "French Florida" from the Bibliothèque Nationale de France, support the more northern location. They further argued that the Native Americans living near the fort spoke Guale, the language spoken in what is now Coastal Georgia, rather than Timucua, the language of northeast Florida. Other scholars have been skeptical of the hypothesis. University of North Florida archaeologist Robert Thunen considers the documentary evidence weak and believes the location is implausibly far from St. Augustine, considering the Spanish were able to march overland to Fort Caroline in two days amid a hurricane. Chuck Meide, archaeologist at the St. Augustine Lighthouse and Museum, expressed similar criticism on the museum's blog, noting that other French and American scholars at the conference seemed similarly skeptical.

== Gallery ==
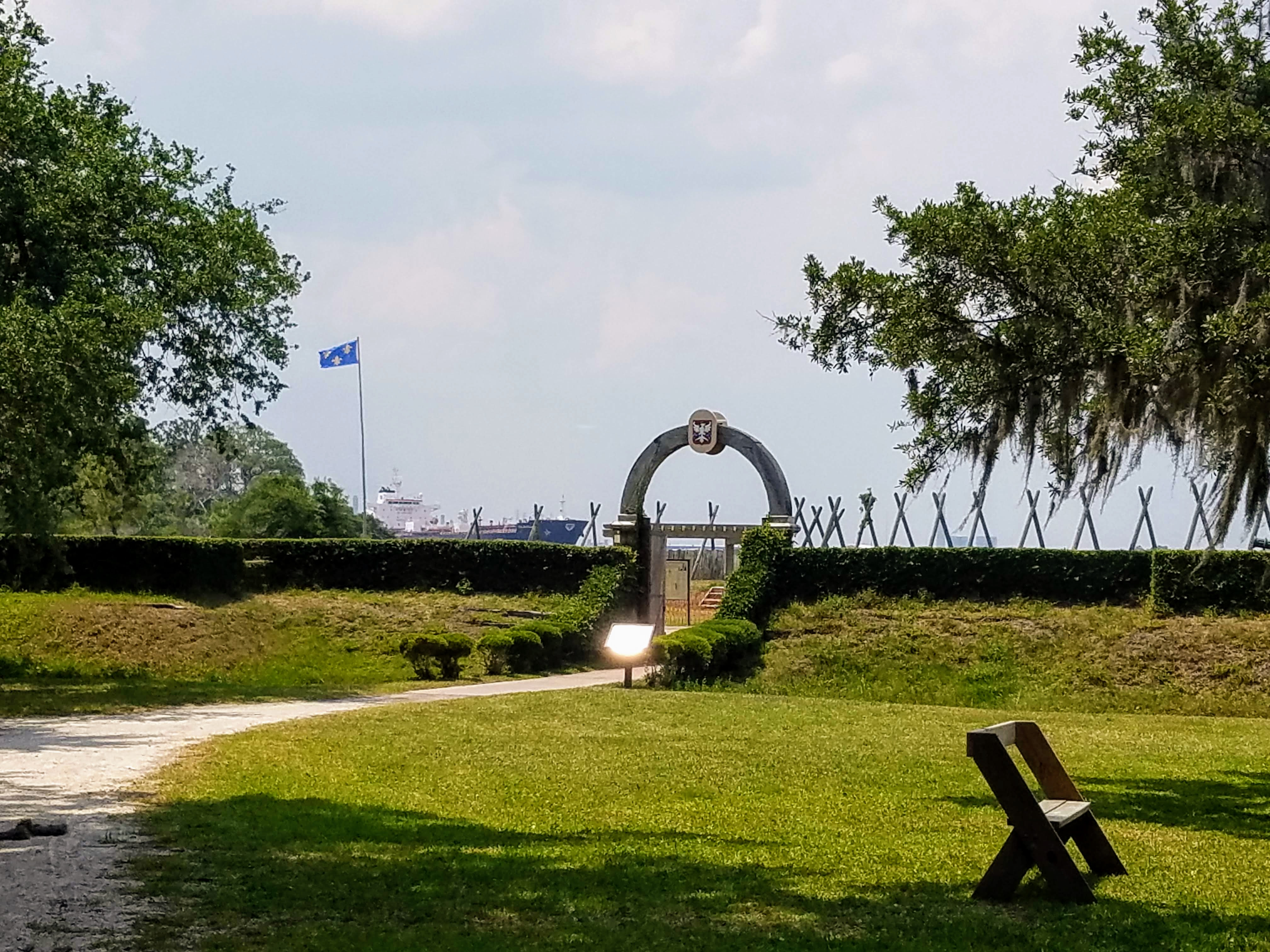
Fort Caroline Entrance 2021

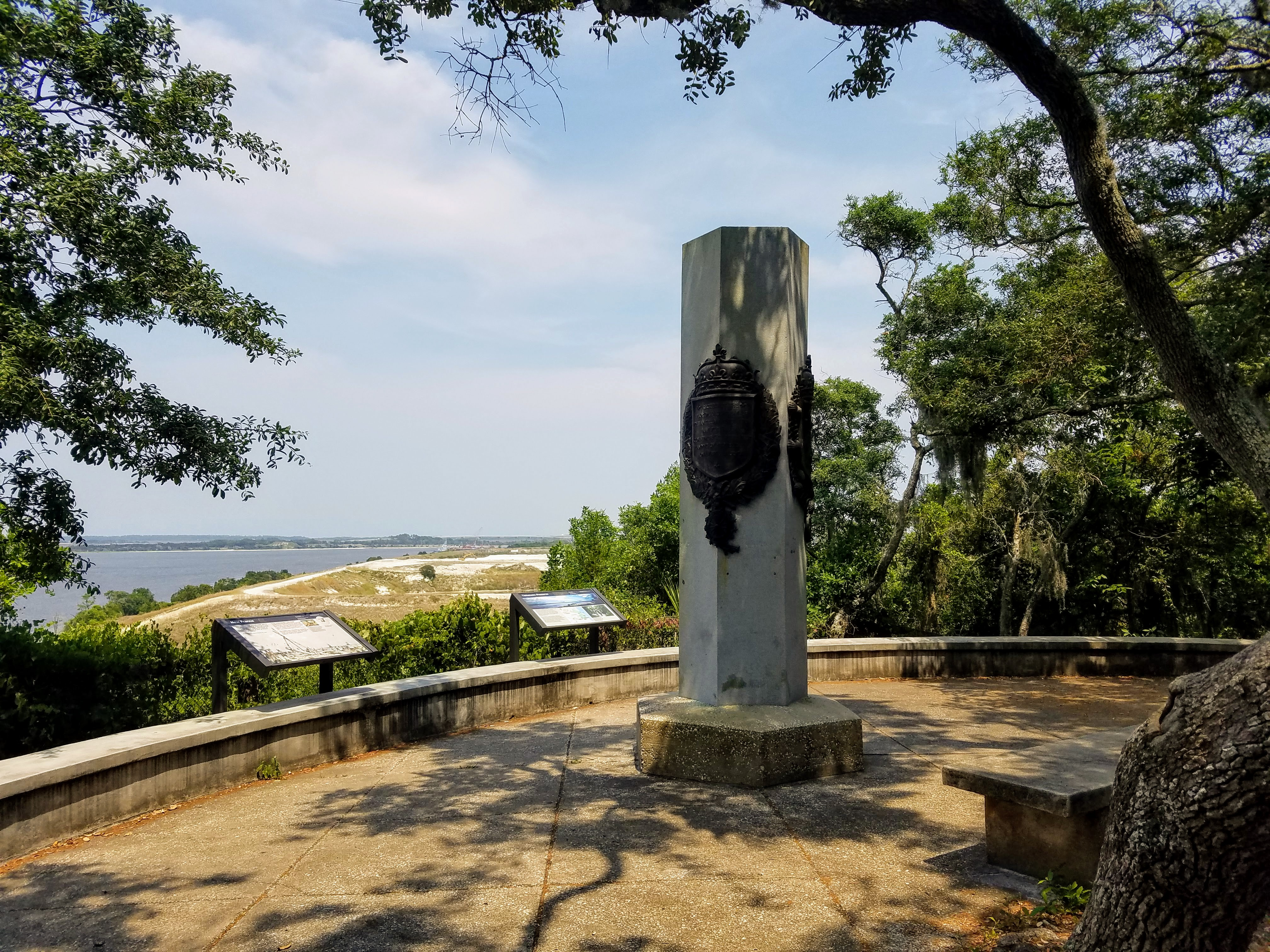
Jean Ribault Monument 2019

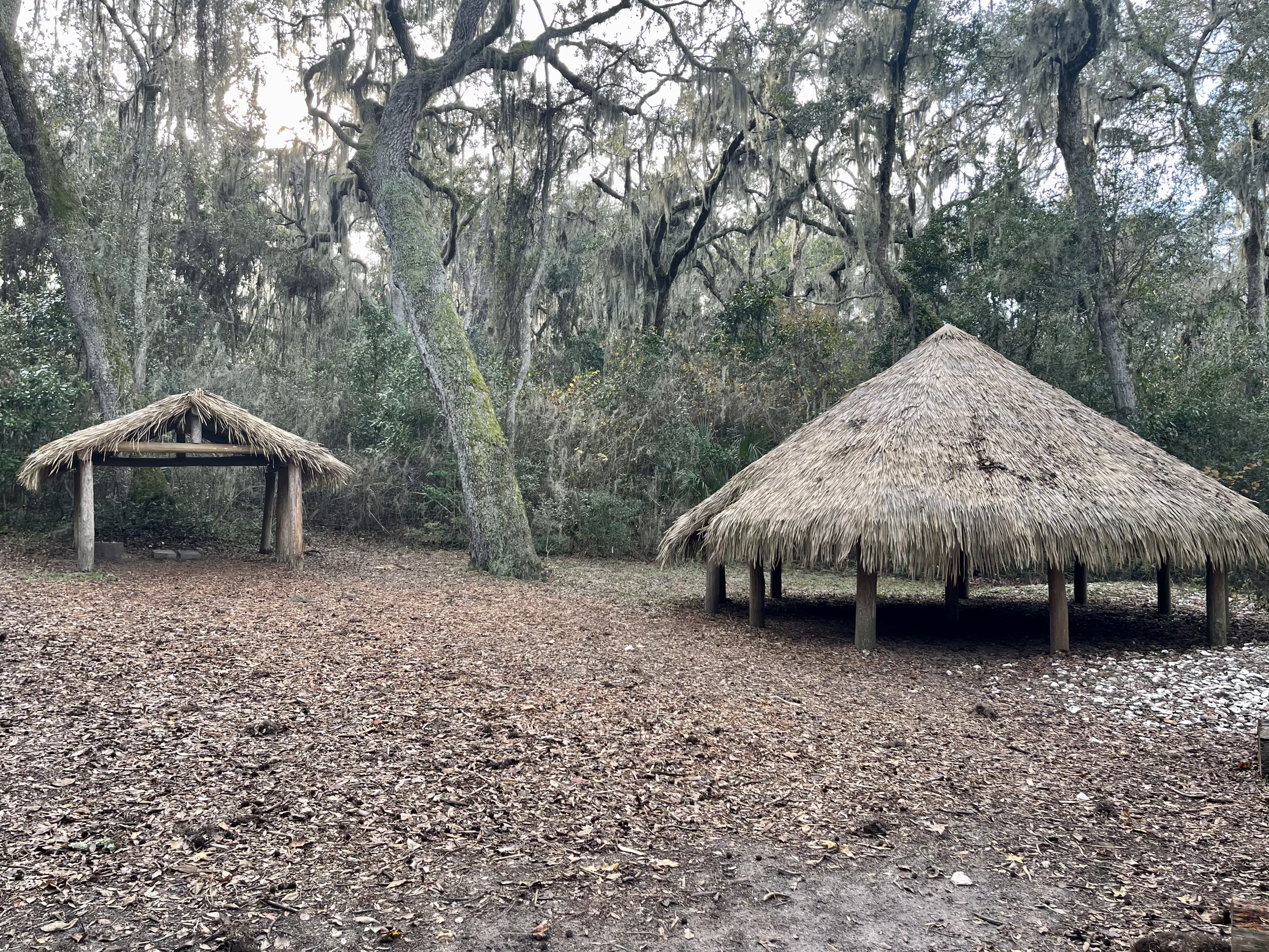
Reproductions of chickee huts along the Fort Caroline trails, 2023

== See also ==
- Fort George Island
- List of French possessions and colonies
- List of national memorials of the United States
