= Timucua language =

Extinct language in U.S. states of Florida and Georgia

Timucua
- Pronunciation: [tiˈmuːkwa]
- Native to: United States
- Region: Florida, Southeastern Georgia, Eastern Texas
- Ethnicity: Timucua
- Extinct: late 18th century
- Language family: Language isolate
- Dialects: Timucua proper; Potano; Itafi/Icafui; Yufera; Mocama; Agua Salada; Tucururu; Agua Fresca/Agua Dulce; Acuera; Oconi; Tawasa?
- Writing system: Latin (Spanish alphabet)

Language codes
- ISO 639-3: tjm
- Glottolog: timu1245
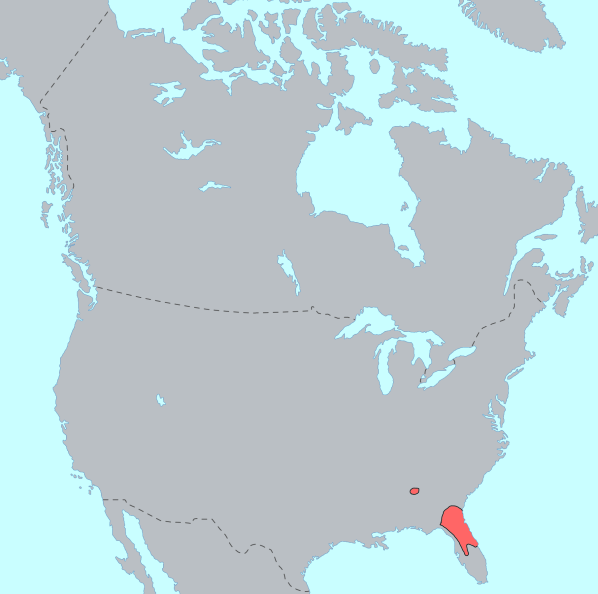
- Pre-contact distribution of the Timucua language. The Tawasa dialect, if it was Timucua, would have been geographically isolated in Alabama

Timucua is a language isolate formerly spoken in northern and central Florida and southern Georgia by the Timucua peoples. Timucua was the primary language used in the area at the time of Spanish colonization in Florida. Differences among the nine or ten Timucua dialects were slight, and appeared to serve mostly to delineate band or tribal boundaries. Some linguists suggest that the Tawasa of what is now northern Alabama may have spoken Timucua, but this is disputed.

Most of what is known of the language comes from the works of Francisco Pareja, a Franciscan missionary who came to St. Augustine in 1595. During his 31 years living with the Timucua, he developed a writing system for the language. From 1612 to 1628, he published several Spanish–Timucua catechisms, as well as a grammar of the Timucua language. Including his seven surviving works, only ten primary sources of information about the Timucua language survive, including two catechisms written in Timucua and Spanish by Gregorio de Movilla in 1635, and a Spanish-translated Timucuan letter to the Spanish Crown dated 1688.

In 1763 the British took over Florida from Spain following the Seven Years' War, in exchange for ceding Cuba to them. Most Spanish colonists and mission Indians, including the few remaining Timucua speakers, left for Cuba, near Havana. The language group is now extinct.

In December 2024, linguistic anthropologist George Aaron Broadwell published a comprehensive reference grammar for the Timucua language, "''Timucua: A Text-Based Reference Grammar,''" with University of Nebraska Press.

== Linguistic relations ==
Timucua is an isolate, not demonstrably related genetically to any of the languages spoken in North America, nor does it show evidence of large amounts of lexical borrowings from them. The primary published hypotheses for relationships are with the Muskogean languages (Swanton (1929), Crawford (1988), and Broadwell (2015), and with various South American families (including Cariban, Arawakan, Chibchan languages, and Warao) Granberry (1993). These hypotheses have not been widely accepted.

== Dialects ==
Father Pareja named nine or ten dialects, each spoken by one or more tribes in northeast Florida and southeast Georgia:

1. Timucua proper – Northern Utina tribe, between the lower (northern) St. Johns River and the Suwannee River, north of the Santa Fe River in Florida and into southern Georgia.
2. Potano – Potano and possibly the Yustaga and Ocale tribes, between the Aucilla River and the Suwannee River in Florida and extending into southern Georgia, but not along the coast of the Gulf of Mexico (with the possible exception of the mouth of the Suwannee River), between the Suwannee River and the Oklawaha River south of the Santa Fe River, extending south into the area between the Oklawaha and the Withlacoochee rivers.
3. Itafi (or Icafui) – Icafui/Cascange and Ibi tribes, in southeast Georgia, along the coast north of Cumberland Island north to the Altamaha River and inland west of the Yufera tribe.
4. Yufera – Yufera tribe, in southeast Georgia, on the mainland west of Cumberland Island.
5. Mocama (Timucua for 'ocean') (called Agua Salada in Hann 1996 and elsewhere) – Mocama, including the Tacatacuru (on Cumberland Island in Georgia) and the Saturiwa (in what is now Jacksonville) tribes, along the Atlantic coast of Florida from the St. Marys River to below the mouth of the St. Johns River, including the lowest part of the St. Johns River.
6. Agua Salada (Spanish for 'salt water' (Maritime in Hann 1996) – tribal affiliation unclear, the Atlantic coast in the vicinity of St. Augustine and inland to the adjacent stretch of the St. Johns River.
7. Tucururu – uncertain, possibly in south-central Florida (a village called Tucuru was "forty leagues from St. Augustine").
8. Agua Fresca (or Agua Dulce; Spanish for "fresh water") – Agua Dulce people (Agua Fresca, or "Freshwater"), including the Utina chiefdom, along the lower St. Johns River, north of Lake George.
9. Acuera – Acuera tribe, on the upper reaches of the Oklawaha River and around Lake Weir.
10. Oconi – Oconi tribe (not to be confused with the Muskogean speaking Oconee tribe), "three days travel" from Cumberland Island, possibly around the Okefenokee Swamp.

Virtually all of the linguistic documentation is from the Mocama and Potano dialects.

Scholars do not agree as to the number of dialects. Some scholars, including Jerald T. Milanich and Edgar H. Sturtevant, have taken Pareja's Agua Salada (saltwater) as an alternate name for the well-attested Mocama dialect (mocama is Timucua for "ocean"). As such, Mocama is often referred to as Agua Salada in the literature. This suggestion would put the number of dialects attested by Pareja at nine. Others, including Julian Granberry, argue that the two names referred to separate dialects, with Agua Salada being spoken in an unknown area of coastal Florida.

Additionally, John R. Swanton identified the language spoken by the Tawasa of Alabama as a dialect of Timucua. This identification was based on a 60-word vocabulary list compiled from a man named Lamhatty, who was recorded in Virginia in 1708. Lamhatty did not speak any language known in Virginia, but was said to have related that he had been kidnapped by the Tuscarora nine months earlier from a town called Towasa, and sold to colonists in Virginia. Lamhatty has been identified as a Timucua speaker, but John Hann calls the evidence of his origin as a Tawasa "tenuous".

== Phonology ==
Timucua was written by Franciscan missionaries in the 17th century based on Spanish orthography. The reconstruction of the sounds is thus based on interpreting Spanish orthography. The charts below give the reconstituted phonemic units in IPA (in brackets) and their general orthography (in plain text).

=== Consonants ===
Timucua had 14 consonants:

	Labial	Alveolar	Palato- alveolar	Velar		Glottal
	Labial	Alveolar	Palato- alveolar	plain	labial	Glottal
Stop	p [p] b [b]	t [t] ([d])		c, q [k]	qu [kʷ]	
Affricate			ch [tʃ]			
Fricative	f [f]	s [s]				h [h]
Nasal	m [m]	n [n]				
Rhotic		r [r]				
Approximant	([w])	l [l]	y [j]			

- /k/ is represented with a c when followed by an /a/, /o/, or /u/; otherwise, it is represented by a q
- There is no true voiced stop; [d] only occurs as an allophone of /t/ after /n/
- [ɡ] existed in Timucua only in Spanish loanwords like "gato" and perhaps as the voiced form of [k] after [n] in words like chequetangala "fourteen"
- The labial glide [w] is said to be heard only after labialized consonants.
- Sounds in question, like /f/ and /b/, indicate possible alternative phonetic values arising from the original Spanish orthography; /b/ is spelled with <b, u, v> in Spanish sources and <ou> in French sources. While it is also possible that sounds /f/ and /b/, are heard as bilabial fricatives [ɸ] and [β], there is only little evidence for this claim.
- The only consonant clusters were intersyllabic /nt/ and /st/, resulting from vowel contractions.
- Geminate consonant clusters did not occur

=== Vowels ===
Timucua had 5 vowels, which could be long or short:

	Front	Back
High	i [i]	u [u]
Mid	e [e]~[æ]	o [o]~[ɔ]
Low	a [a]	

- Vowel clusters were limited to intersyllabic /iu/, /ia/, /ua/, /ai/
- Timucua had no true diphthongs.

=== Syllable structure ===
Syllables in Timucua were of the form CV, V, and occasionally VC (which never occurred in word-final position).

=== Stress ===
Words of one, two, or three syllables have primary stress on the first syllable. In words of more than three syllables, the first syllable receives a primary stress while every syllable after receives a secondary stress, unless there was an enclitic present, which normally took the primary stress.

Examples:

- yobo [yóbò] 'stone'
- nipita [nípìtà] 'mouth'
- atimucu [átìmûkù] 'frost'
- holatamaquí [hôlàtâmàkʷí] 'and the chief'

=== Phonological processes ===
There are two phonological processes in Timucua: automatic alteration and reduplication.

==== Alteration ====
There are two types of alteration, both of which only involve vowels: assimilation and substitution.

- Assimilations occur across morpheme boundaries when the first morpheme ends in a vowel and the second morpheme begins with a vowel. Examples: tera 'good' + acola 'very' → teracola 'very good'; coloma 'here' + uqua 'not' → colomaqua 'not here.'
- Substitutions also occur across morpheme boundaries. Regressive substitutions involve only the "low" vowels (/e/, /a/, and /o/) in the first-morpheme position, and can occur even if there is a consonant present between the vowels. The last vowel of the first morpheme is then either raised or backed. Other regressive substitutions involve the combination of suffixes, and their effects on the vowels vary from pair to pair. Non-regressive substitutions, on the other hand, affect the second vowel of the morpheme pair. Examples: ite 'father' + -ye 'your' → itaye 'your father' (regressive); ibine 'water' + -ma 'the' + -la 'proximate time' → ibinemola 'it is the water' (regressive, suffix combination); ucu 'drink' + -no 'action designator' → ucunu 'to drink' (non-regressive).

These can in turn be either regressive or non-regressive. In regressive alterations, the first vowel of the second morpheme changes the last vowel of the first morpheme. Regressive assimilations are only conditioned by phonological factors while substitutions take into account semantic information.

Non-regressive alterations are all substitutions, and involve both phonological and semantic factors.

==== Reduplication ====
Reduplication repeats entire morphemes or lexemes to indicate the intensity of an action or to place emphasis on the word.

Example: noro 'devotion' + mo 'do' + -ta 'durative' → noronoromota 'do it with great devotion.'

== Morphology ==
Timucua was an agglutinative synthetic language.

=== Bases ===
These morphemes contained both semantic and semiological information (non-base morphemes only contained semiological information). They could occur as either free bases, which did not need affixes, and bound bases, which only occurred with affixes. However, free bases could be designated different parts of speech (verbs, nouns, etc.) based on the affixes attached, and sometimes can be used indifferently as any one with no change.

=== Affixes ===
Timucua had three types of bound affix morphemes: prefixes, suffixes, and enclitics.

==== Prefixes ====
Timucua only had five prefixes: ni- and ho-, '1st person,' ho- 'pronoun,' chi- '2nd person,' and na- 'instrumental noun'

==== Suffixes ====
Timucua used suffixes far more often, and it is the primary affix used for derivation, part-of-speech designation, and inflection. Most Timucua suffixes were attached to verbs.

==== Enclitics ====
Enclitics were also used often in Timucua. Unlike suffixes and prefixes, they were not required to fill a specific slot, and enclitics usually bore the primary stress of a word.

=== Pronouns ===
Only the 1st and 2nd person singular are independent pronouns—all other pronominal information is given in particles or nouns. There is no gender distinction or grammatical case. The word oqe, for example, can be 'she, her, to her, he, him, to him, it, to it,' etc. without the aid of context.

=== Nouns ===
There are nine morphemic slots within the "noun matrix":

- 1 – Base
- 2 – Possessive Pronoun
- 3 – Pronoun Plural
- 4A – Base Plural
- 4B – Combining Form
- 5 – 'The'
- 6 – Particles
- 7 – Enclitics
- 8 – Reflexive

Only slot 1 and 4A must be filled in order for the lexeme to be a noun.

=== Verbs ===
Timucua verbs contain many subtleties not present in English or even in other indigenous languages of the United States. However, there is no temporal aspect to Timucua verbs – there is no past tense, no future tense, etc. Verbs have 13 morphemic slots, but it is rare to find a verb with all 13 filled, although those with 8 or 9 are frequently used.

1. Subject pronoun
2. Object pronoun
3. Base (verb)
4. Transitive-Causative
5. Reflexive/Reciprocal
6. Action designation
7. Subject pronoun plural
8. Aspect (Durative, Bounded, Potential)
9. Status (Perfective, Conditional)
10. Emphasis (Habitual, Punctual-Intensive)
11. Locus (Proximate, Distant)
12. Mode (Indicative, Optative, Subjunctive, Imperative)
13. Subject pronouns (optional and rare – found only in questions)

=== Particles ===
Particles are the small number of free bases that occur with either no affixes or only with the pluralizer -ca. They function as nominals, adverbials, prepositions, and demonstratives. They are frequently added onto one another, onto enclitics, and onto other bases. A few examples are the following:

- amiro 'much, many'
- becha 'tomorrow'
- ocho 'behind'
- na 'this'
- michu 'that'
- tulu 'immediately'
- quana 'for, with'
- pu, u, ya 'no'

== Syntax ==
According to Granberry, "Without fuller data ... it is of course difficult to provide a thorough statement on Timucua syntax."

Timucua was an SOV language; that is, the phrasal word order was subject–object–verb, unlike the English order of subject–verb–object. There are six parts of speech: verbs, nouns, pronouns, modifiers (there is no difference between adjectives and adverbs in Timucua), demonstratives, and conjunctions. As these are not usually specifically marked, a word's part of speech is generally determined by its relationship with and location within the phrase.

=== Phrases ===
Phrases typically consist of two lexemes, with one acting as the "head-word," defining the function, and the other performing a syntactic operation. The most frequently-occurring lexeme, or in some cases just the lexeme that occurs first, is the "head-word." All phrases are either verb phrases (e.g. Noun + Finite Verb, Pronoun + Non-Finite Verb, etc.) or noun phrases (e.g. Noun + Modifier, Determiner + Noun, etc.). If the non-head lexeme occurs after the "head-word," then it modifies the "head-word." If it occurs before, different operations occur depending on the lexeme's part of speech and whether it is located in a verb or noun phrase. For example, a particle occurring before the "head-word" in a noun phrase becomes a demonstrative, and a non-finite verb in a verb phrase becomes a modifier.

=== Clauses ===
Clauses in Timucua are: subjects, complements (direct or indirect object), predicates, and clause modifiers.

=== Sentences ===
Timucua sentences typically contained a single independent clause, although they occasionally occurred with subordinate clauses acting as modifiers.

== Sample vocabulary ==
Vocabulary
English	Timucua
one	yaha
two	yucha
three	hapu
man	biro
woman	nia
dog	efa
sun	ela
moon	acu
water	ibi
door	ucuchua
fire	taca
tobacco	hinino
bread	pesolo
drink	ucu

=== Sample text ===
Here is a sample from Fr. Pareja's Confessionario, featuring a priest's interview of Timucua speakers preparing for conversion. It is given below in Timucua and early modern Castilian Spanish from the original, as well as an English translation.

Hachipileco, cacaleheco, chulufi eyolehecote, nahebuasota, caquenchabequestela, mota una yaruru catemate, caquenihabe, quintela manta bohobicho?
La graja canta o otra aue, y el cuerpo me parece que me tiembla, señal es que viene gente que ay algo de nuebo, as lo assi creydo?
Do you believe that when the crow or another bird sings and the body is trembling, that is a signal that people are coming or something important is about to happen?

== See also ==
- Timucua

== Primary sources ==
- Pareja, Francisco. (1612a) Cathecismo en lengua castellana, y Timuquana. En el qual se contiene lo que se les puede enseñar a los adultos que an de ser baptizados. Mexico City: Impresa de la Viuda de Pedro Balli. Digital version from New York Historical Society
- Pareja, Francisco. (1612b) Catechismo y breve exposición de la doctrina christiana. Mexico City: Casa de la viuda de Pedro Balli. Digital version from the New York Historical Society
- Pareja, Francisco. (1613) Confessionario en lengua castellana y timuquana con unos consejos para animar al penitente. Mexico City: Emprenta de la viuda de Diego Lopez Daualos. Digital version from the New York Historical Society
- Pareja, Francisco. (1614). Arte y pronunciación en lengua timvquana y castellana. Mexico: Emprenta de Ioan Ruyz. Digital version at Google Books
- Pareja, Francisco. (1627a). Catecismo en lengua timuquana y castellana en el qual se instruyen y cathequizan los adultos infieles que an de ser Christianos. Mexico City: Emprenta de Ioan Ruyz. Digital version at Google Books and AECID Digital Library
- Pareja, Francisco. (1627b). Cathecismo y Examen para los que comulgan. En lengua castellana y timuquana. Mexico City: Imprenta de Iuan Ruyz. Digital version from All Souls College
- Pareja, Francisco. (1628). IIII. parte del catecismo, en lengua Timuquana, y castellana. En que se trata el modo de oyr Missa, y sus ceremonias. Mexico City: Imprenta de Iuan Ruyz. Digital version from All Souls College
- Movilla, Gregorio de. (1635a) Explicacion de la Doctrina que compuso el cardenal Belarmino, por mandado del Señor Papa Clemente viii. Traducida en Lengua Floridana: por el Padre Fr. Gregorio de Movilla. Mexico: Imprenta de Iuan Ruyz. Digital version from the New York Historical Society
- Movilla, Gregorio de. (1635b) Forma breue de administrar los sacramentos a los Indios, y Españoles que viuen entre ellos … lo q[ue] estaua en le[n]gua Mexicana traducido en lengua Florida. Mexico: R Digital version from the New York Historical Society
