= San Pedro de Mocama =

Spanish mission in Georgia (US state)

San Pedro de Mocama was a Spanish colonial Franciscan Catholic mission on Cumberland Island, in the present-day U.S. state of Georgia. The mission was established in 1587. It was last mentioned in missionary documents in 1655. The Franciscans at San Pedro attempted to convert the Tacatacuru, a Timucuan-speaking sub-tribe of the Mocama, to Christianity. The mission was abandoned due to the dwindling numbers of Tacatacuru and poor relations with other Indian tribes. The residents relocated to Mission San Juan del Puerto near present day Jacksonville, Florida. A few survivors of Spanish missions were evacuated to Cuba in 1763.

== History ==
The coastal areas from northern Florida, Georgia and South Carolina country have been inhabited by Indians for thousands of years. Archaeological investigations of site in the low country have found villages at least 4,000 years old. The Timucuan language spoken in the low country is a language isolate, meaning that it has no proven relationship with any other language which suggests long isolation from peoples speaking other languages. There are eleven dialects of Timucuan. The Tacatacuru who inhabited Cumberland Island were part of a Timucua group known as the Mocama. The Mocama spoke a dialect of Timucuan.

The first recorded contact of Europeans with the inhabitants of Cumberland Island was by Frenchman Jean Ribault in 1562. In 1566, Jesuit missionaries attempted to found a mission on the island but four Jesuits and eleven Spanish soldiers were killed by the Tacatacuru living on the island. In response, the Spanish executed the Tacatacuru chieftain. The Spanish settlement on the island was abandoned in 1572. In 1587, A Franciscan priest, Baltasar Lopez, established the San Pedro de Mocama mission. In 1597, the Guale under Juanillo attacked San Pedro, but were repulsed by the Tacatacuru. The Tacatacuru leader was rewarded generously for warning the Spanish of the raid. The mission, however, was abandoned for a time. In 1602, Lopez said that all 300 of the Indians on the island were Christians and that he served a total of 792 Christian Indians, some of them from the nearby mainland or other islands. In 1603, the visiting governor of Spanish Florida, Gonzalo Méndez de Canço said the mission church was in poor condition. The church was subsequently rebuilt and additional missionaries arrived. In 1605, twelve Franciscan missionaries arrived in Florida and missionary activity up and down the coast expanded.

Epidemics of diseases of European origin may have impacted the Indians of the coast prior to the establishment of the mission. The first clear evidence of an epidemic in San Pedro de Mocama is 1595, shortly after the establishment of the mission. Another round of epidemics occurred from 1613 to 1617 "resulting in a very great harvest of souls." In 1654-1655, an epidemic of what was believed to be smallpox killed one half of the Timucua. In 1659, an epidemic of measles was estimated to have killed 10,000 people in the Spanish colony. The net result of these epidemics was that the total Timucua population, estimated at twenty to twenty-five thousand in 1600, was reduced to 1,000 to 2,000. The San Pedro de Mocama mission, as were all others in the Spanish colony, was depopulated.

The Mission of San Pedro de Mocama is last mentioned in Spanish documents in 1655. Between that year and 1675, the surviving Tacatacuru people left the island and moved southward toward St. Augustine, Florida. They were probably under pressure from the Guale and Yamasee people from the coastal areas to their north and the slave-raiding Westo, resident inland along the Savannah River. In 1680, 100 Yamasee were living on Cumberland Island. Two Spanish priests established a new mission called San Felipe on the island. By 1705, the Spanish mission system had collapsed. The Timucua, Mocama, and Tacatacuru lost their tribal identities and became identified only as "Christian Indians."

== Tacatacuru peoples ==
Mission San Pedro was built at the south end of Cumberland Island, near the main village of the Tacatacuru. By 1595 some of the Tacatacuru−Mocama living near the mission were fluent in Spanish. Some had learned to read and write in a combination of Spanish, Latin, and the system of writing the Timucua language devised by Father Francisco Pareja, who worked at the San Juan del Puerto mission, located at the mouth of the St. Johns River at present-day Fort George Island. He wrote a catechism in Spanish and Timucuan that was printed in 1612.

In 1752, Christian Indians, including a remnant of the Timucua, Mocama, and Tacatacuru, lived in five villages with a population of 158 people near St. Augustine. The Indians intermarried with Africans. In 1763, Spain gave up its ownership of Florida in the Treaty of Paris. Three thousand residents of the Spanish colony, including the Christian Indians, were evacauted from Florida to take up residence in Cuba. Fifteen Indian families were settled in the village of Guanabacoa, near Havana. Most of the Florida Indians soon died although one Timucuan named Manuel Riso is recorded to have lived until age 95.

== See also ==
- Spanish missions in Georgia
- Spanish Florida topics — colonial region.
- Timucua peoples topics
- Viceroyalty of New Spain — Spanish colonial North America.
