= Spanish assault on French Florida =

1565 military campaign

Action of September 1565
- Part of French colonial conflicts
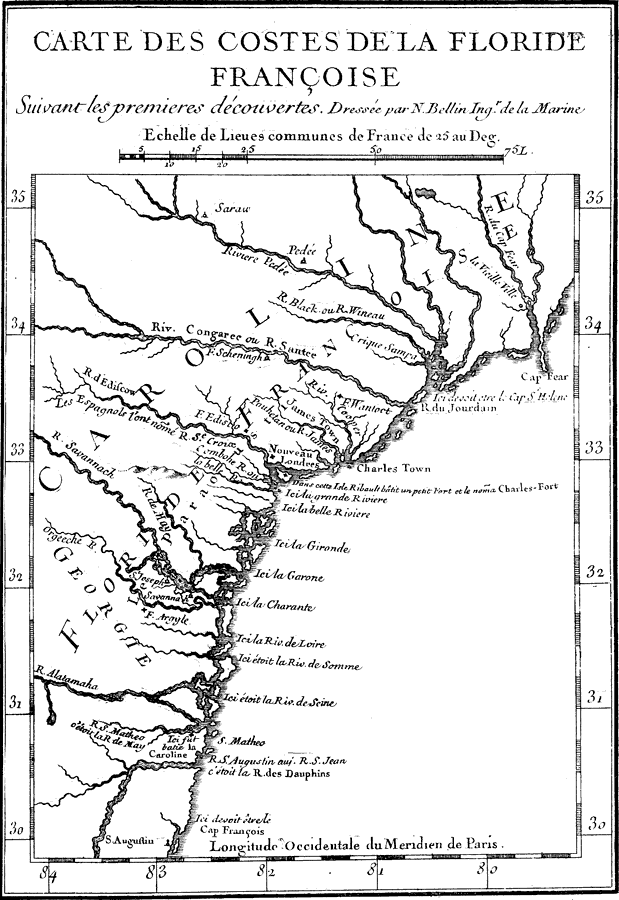
- Image of French settlement in Florida in 1562.
Date	September 4, 1565 – October 12, 1565
Location	Fort Caroline, Florida; Matanzas Inlet
Result	Spanish victory

Belligerents
New Spain	Huguenots

Commanders and leaders
(Spain) Pedro Menéndez de Avilés (Spain) Diego Flores de Valdés	Jean Ribault †; René Goulaine de Laudonnière

Strength
49 ships (including merchant ships)	33 ships

Casualties and losses
	1 admiral, 700 men

The Spanish assault on French Florida began as part of imperial Spain's geopolitical strategy of developing colonies in the New World to protect its claimed territories against incursions by other European powers. From the early 16th century, the French had historic claims to some of the lands in the New World that the Spanish called La Florida. The French crown and the Huguenots led by Admiral Gaspard de Coligny believed that planting French settlers in Florida would help defuse religious conflicts in France and strengthen its own claim to a part of North America. The Crown wanted to discover and exploit valuable commodities, especially silver and gold, as the Spanish had done with the mines of Mexico and Central and South America. The political and religious enmities that existed between the Catholics and Huguenots of France resulted in an attempt by the Huguenot Jean Ribault in February 1562 to settle a colony at Charlesfort on Port Royal Sound, and the subsequent arrival of René Goulaine de Laudonnière at Fort Caroline, on the St. Johns River in June 1564.

The Spanish laid claim to a vast area that included the modern state of Florida, along with much of what is now the southeastern United States, on the strength of several expeditions in the first half of the 1500s, including those of Ponce de Leon and Hernando de Soto. However, Spanish attempts to establish a lasting presence in La Florida failed until September 1565, when Pedro Menéndez de Avilés founded St. Augustine about 30 miles south of Fort Caroline. Menendez had not known that the French had already arrived in the area, and upon discovering the existence of Fort Caroline, he aggressively moved to expel those whom he considered heretics and intruders. When Jean Ribault learned of the Spanish presence nearby, he also decided on a swift assault and sailed south from Fort Caroline with most of his troops to search for St. Augustine. However, his ships were struck by a storm (possibly a tropical storm) and most of the French force was lost at sea, leaving Ribault and several hundred survivors shipwrecked with limited food and supplies near Mosquito Inlet (Ponce de Leon Inlet), about 60 miles south of the Spanish colony. Meanwhile, Menendez marched north, overwhelmed the remaining defenders of Fort Caroline, massacred most of the French Protestants in the town, and left an occupying force in the rechristened Fort Mateo. Upon returning to St. Augustine, he received news that Ribault and his troops were stranded to the south. Menendez quickly moved to attack and massacred the French force on the shore of what became known as the Matanzas River, sparing only the Catholics among the French.

With Fort Caroline captured and the French forces killed or driven away, Spain's claim to La Florida was legitimized by the doctrine of uti possidetis de facto, or "effective occupation", and Spanish Florida stretched from the Panuco River on the Gulf of Mexico up the Atlantic coast to Chesapeake Bay, leaving England and France to establish their own colonies elsewhere. While Spain's rivals did not seriously challenge its claim to the vast territory for several decades, a French force led by Dominique de Gourgues attacked and destroyed Fort Mateo in 1568, and English pirates and privateers sporadically raided St. Augustine over the next century.

== Fort Caroline ==
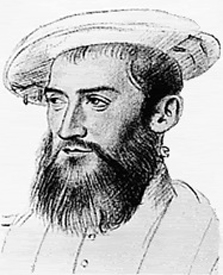
Portrait of Jean Ribault (1520 – 1565)

Jean Ribault founded his colony at Port Royal in 1562, having previously come upon the St. Johns, which he called la Rivière de Mai (the River of May), because he saw it on the first of that month. Two years later, in 1564, Laudonnière landed at the Indian town of Seloy, the site of present-day St. Augustine, Florida, and named the river la Rivière des Dauphins (the River of Dolphins) after its plentiful dolphins; moving north, he established a settlement at Fort Caroline on the south side of the St. Johns, six miles from its mouth. Philip II of Spain regarded the possession of Florida as necessary for the safety of Spanish commerce. Hearing that Ribault, who had returned to France, was organizing another expedition for the relief of his colony of Huguenots across the Atlantic, Philip determined to assert his claim to the possession of Florida on the ground of prior discovery, and root out the French at all costs. Pedro Menéndez de Avilés had already been authorized to settle there, and his force was increased to enable him first to expel the French.

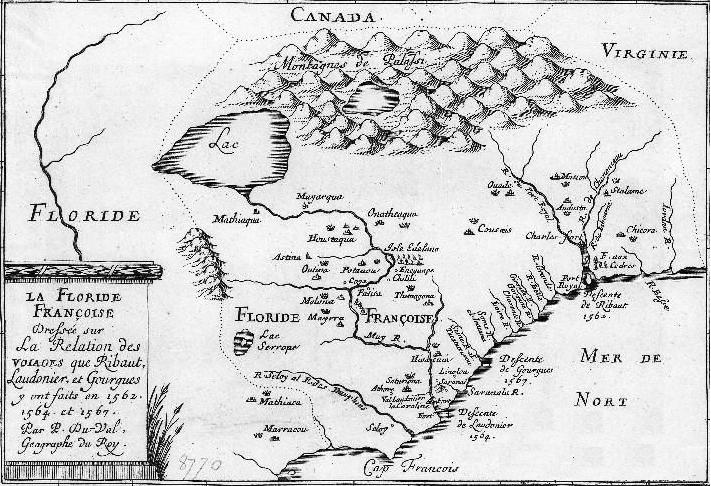
17th century map of French Florida by Pierre du Val

Laudonnière, in the meantime, had been driven to desperation by famine, although surrounded by waters abounding with fish and shellfish, and had been partially relieved by the arrival of the ship of the English sea dog and slave trader Sir John Hawkins, who furnished him a vessel to return to France. They were awaiting fair winds to sail when Ribault appeared with his timely provisions and reinforcements. The plan of returning to France was then abandoned, and every effort made to repair Fort Caroline. The expedition of Menéndez had been badly storm-beaten, but at last he reached the coast with part of his fleet, only to find Ribault already there with his force. Menéndez then founded and named St. Augustine (San Agustín) on September 8, 1565. Ribault, who had awaited this arrival of the Spaniards, and had instructions to resist them, decided to attack Menéndez at once, and although opposed by Laudonnière, insisted on taking on board the ships nearly all the able-bodied men of the fleet and colony, so as to attack and crush the Spanish project. Laudonnière was left in the small fort on the St. Johns with the women, the sick, and a handful of men.

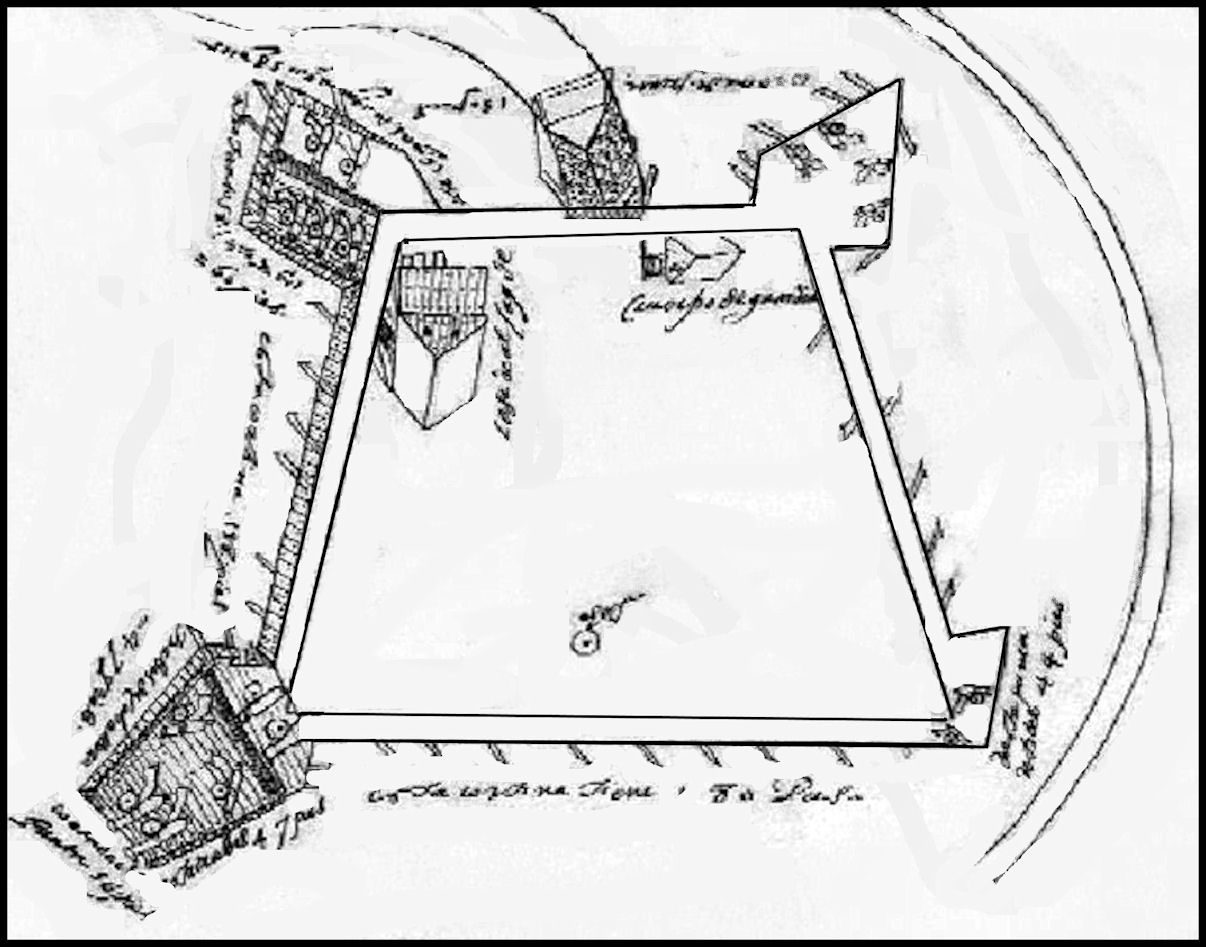
Plano del Fuerte de San Agustin de la Florida. A plan view of one of the earliest Spanish forts built at St. Augustine, with figures of the day and night sentinels, the places where the soldiers fight, cannon, etc.

Meanwhile, Menéndez, after gathering his men to hear Mass around a temporary altar, traced the outline of the first Spanish fort to be built in St. Augustine, at a spot located near the site of the present Castillo de San Marcos. At the time the French cruisers that preyed on Spanish commerce showed little mercy to the people taken in the richly laden galleons, unless their rank or wealth gave hopes of a large ransom; the Spaniards, when French cruisers fell into their hands, were unsparing as well. Menéndez placed his main reliance on the fort, and every one of the people he had landed now labored to throw up the earthworks and defenses, while he superintended the disembarkation of artillery and ammunition, supplies and tools. During the work some of Ribault's vessels appeared—they might have made a dash and captured the Spanish commander, but they merely reconnoitred, and retired to report. The work on defenses continued apace, and Menéndez, unable to compete with the French on the sea, sent off his larger vessels, retaining only some light craft. The French fleet soon appeared, but Ribault faltered. Had he landed, success was possible; a way was open for retreat by land and water to his fort on the St. Johns. However, he chose to stand off. Menéndez, a more practiced seaman, saw that he had an advantage; he had scanned the sky for weather signs, and knew that a norther was coming. The French fleet would be swept before it and perhaps be wrecked, or escaping that, be driven so far that days would elapse before Ribault could make an attack.

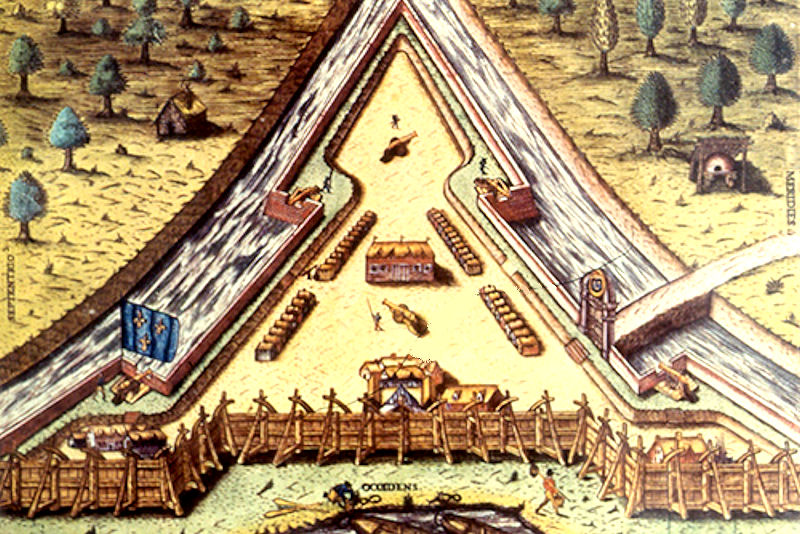
Colored engraving of a view of French Fort Caroline on the St. Johns River, by Theodore de Bry (1528-98) after a drawing by Jacques le Moyne de Morgues (1533-88)

Menéndez decided in his turn to attack the French fort, and deprive Ribault of that refuge. Guided by Indians, Menéndez, with a force of picked men, trudged through the swamps during the storm, and though many of his men fell back, he arrived at Fort Caroline, where the sentinels, unsuspecting of danger, were sheltering themselves from the rains. The Spanish attack was brief and successful. Laudonnière escaped with a few companions to a vessel in the river, leaving his command to be slaughtered by Menéndez. The French fort was overrun, the French flags removed, and Spanish banners raised above it. Meanwhile, the settlers at the fort of St. Augustine were made anxious by the fierce storm that threatened the destruction of their wooden houses and all they had, and feared that French ships could have laid up from the storm in some neighboring harbor, ready to attack them before Menéndez returned. Adding to this anxiety, the deserters who came back to the fort declared that the Asturian sailor, ignorant of military operations, would never return alive. Eventually a man was sighted who approached the settlement shouting. When near enough to be understood, he cried that Menéndez had taken the French fort and put all the French to the sword. A procession was formed to go forth and meet the victor. Soon after his triumphant reception in the fort, Menéndez heard of Ribault's party having been wrecked, and learned that a detachment had made its way to Matanzas Inlet. After an ineffective interview and an offer of 100,000 ducats ransom, the Huguenots surrendered to Menéndez, and met the same fate as their comrades at Fort Caroline. A second party, with Ribault himself, were also slain at the hands of the Spanish. A few, however, who belonged to the Catholic faith, were spared.

== History ==
=== Menéndez pursues the French fleet ===
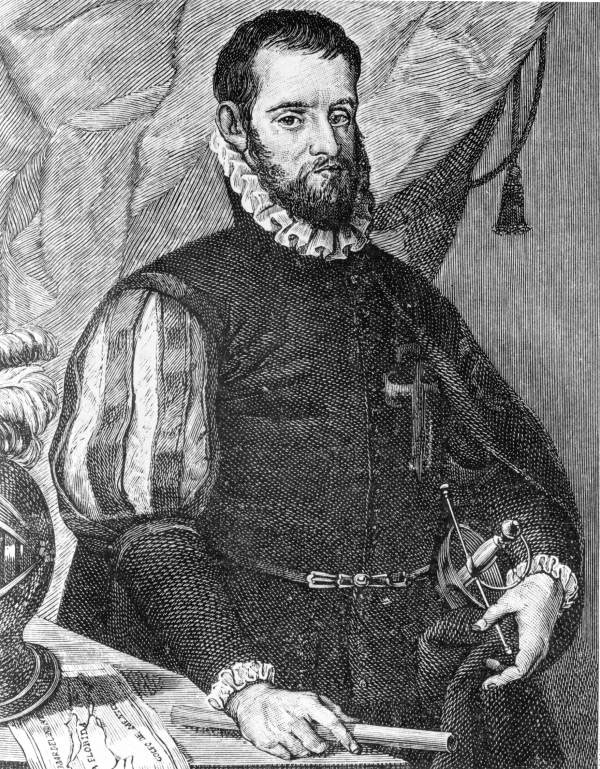
Portrait of Pedro Menéndez de Avilés, after a painting by Titian

On Tuesday, September 4, Pedro Menéndez de Avilés, adelantado of La Florida, set sail from the harbor of what was to become the presidio of St. Augustine, and coasting north, came upon four vessels lying at anchor off the mouth of a river. These were Jean Ribault's flagship, the Trinity, and three others of his ships, which the Frenchman had left at the mouth of the St. Johns because they were too large to pass the bars in safety. One of them was flying the Admiral's flag, another the flag of the Captain. Menéndez recognized at once that the French reinforcements had arrived before him, and called a council of his captains to consider what action should be taken.

In the opinion of the council it was deemed advisable to sail to Santo Domingo and to return to Florida in March of the following year. But Menéndez thought otherwise. His presence was already known to the enemy, four of his ships were so crippled by the gale that they could not make good time, and he believed that if the French should give chase to his fleet, they could outsail it. He concluded that it was better to attack at once, and, having beaten them, to return to St. Augustine and await reinforcements. His advice prevailed, so the Spaniards proceeded on their way. When within half a league of the French a thunderstorm passed over them, followed by a calm, and they were compelled to lie still until ten o'clock in the evening, then a land breeze sprang up, and they again got under way. Menéndez had given orders to approach the French ships bow to bow, and then to wait and board them at daybreak, for he feared they would set fire to their own vessels and thus endanger his, and would then escape to land in their rowboats.

The Frenchmen soon perceived the Spanish approach and began firing at them, but their aim was directed too high, and the shot passed harmlessly between the masts without doing any damage. Ignoring the discharge and without reply Menéndez kept on his course until, passing right in their midst, he drew up the bow of the San Pelayo between that of the Trinity and another of the enemy's ships. Then he sounded a salute on his trumpets and the French replied. When this was over Menéndez asked, "Gentlemen, from where does this fleet come?" "From France," answered a voice from the Trinity. "What are you doing here?" "Bringing infantry, artillery, and supplies for a fort which the King of France has in this country, and for others which he is going to make." "Are you Catholics or Lutherans?" he asked next.

"Lutherans, and our General is Jean Ribault," came the response. Then the French in turn addressed the same questions to the Spaniards, to which Menéndez himself replied: "I am Captain-General of the fleet of the King of Spain, and I am come into this country to hang and behead all Lutherans I may find by land or sea, and in the morning I will board your ships; and if I find any Catholics they will be well treated; but all who are heretics shall die." In the silence which prevailed while the parley was in progress, those aboard his ship heard a boat put out from one of the Frenchmen, carrying a message to their flagship and the reply of the French commander, "I am the Admiral, I will die first," from which they inferred that it was a proposition to surrender.

When the conversation was ended there followed an exchange of abuse and foul words, until Menéndez ordered his crew to draw their swords and to pay out the cable so as to board at once. The sailors showed some hesitation, so Menéndez sprang down from the bridge to urge them on and found that the cable was caught in the capstan, which caused a delay. The Frenchmen had also heard the signal and, taking advantage of the momentary pause, cut their cables, passed right through the Spanish fleet, and fled, three vessels turning to the north and the other to the south, with the Spaniards in hot pursuit. Menéndez' two ships took the northerly course, but the three French galleons outsailed him, and at dawn he gave up the chase. He reached the mouth of the St. Johns at ten o'clock in the morning to pursue his original plan of seizing and fortifying it.

On attempting its entrance he discovered three ships up the river and at the point of the land two companies of infantry, who brought their artillery to bear upon him. So he gave up trying to capture the entrance and made for St. Augustine. The three Spanish vessels which took the southerly course in pursuit of the remaining French ship continued the chase all night. Menéndez had ordered them to rejoin him at the mouth of the St. Johns in the morning, and, if unable to do so, to return to St. Augustine. A storm arose and they were obliged to cast anchor off the coast, the vessels being so small they dared not to take to the sea. One of the three broke away, and while in this peril a French ship was sighted, but it did not attack them, although it hove to within a league of their own ship.

=== Founding of St. Augustine ===
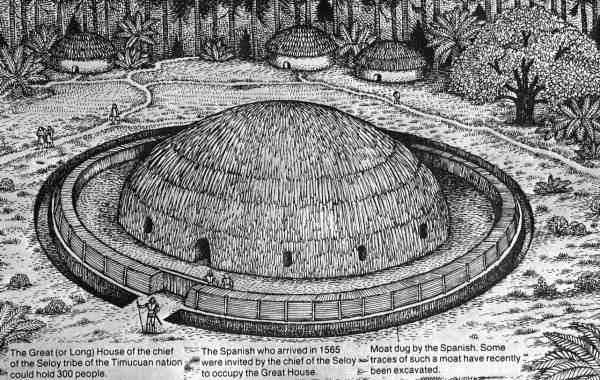
Pedro Menéndez de Avilés moved his colony to the settlement of the Seloy tribe of the Timucua. Their chief gave them the Great House, a huge circular or oval thatched structure able to hold several hundred people. Around this meeting house the Spanish dug a moat and added fortifications.

The following day, Thursday, September 6, after sighting a second French vessel they made for a nearby harbor, which proved to be that of St. Augustine, and on landing found that the other two vessels had preceded them, having also arrived the same day. The harbor was near the village of an Indian chief named Seloy, who received them cordially. The Spaniards at once went to work to fortify a large Indian dwelling, probably a communal house, which lay near the water's edge. They dug a trench around it and threw up a breastwork of earth and fagots. This was the beginning of the Spanish colony at St. Augustine, which became the oldest continuously inhabited European settlement in the United States. In May of the following year, the settlement was temporarily moved to what was considered a more advantageous position on Anastasia Island, and then moved back to the mainland in 1572.

Menéndez at once began disembarking his troops, landing two hundred of them. On Friday, September 7, he sent his three smaller ships into the harbor, and three hundred more colonists were landed, along with the married men, their wives, and children, and most of the artillery and ammunition. On Saturday, the feast of Our Lady of Charity, the balance of the colonists, one hundred in number, and supplies were put ashore. Then the Adelantado himself landed amidst the waving of flags, the sounding of trumpets and other instruments, and the salutes of the artillery. The chaplain, Mendoza, who had gone ashore the previous day, advanced to meet him, chanting the Te Deum Laudamus and carrying a cross which Menéndez and those with him kissed, falling upon their knees. Then Menéndez took possession in the King's name. The mass of Our Lady was solemnly chanted, and the oath was administered to the various officials in the presence of a large concourse of friendly Indians who imitated all of the postures of the Spaniards. The ceremony was concluded by the serving out of food to colonists and Indians alike. The African slaves were quartered in the huts of the Indian village and work on the defenses proceeded with their labor.

While these events were in progress, two of Ribault's ships, which the Spaniards had chased on the night of September 4, made a demonstration at the mouth of the harbor, offering combat to the San Pelayo and the San Salvador, which were unable to cross the bar on account of their size, and lay outside exposed to attack. The challenge was not accepted, and after watching from a distance the landing of the troops, the Frenchmen sailed away the same afternoon, and returned to the mouth of the St. Johns.

Menéndez feared Ribault would return, attack his fleet while he was unloading, and perhaps capture the San Pelayo, which carried the major part of his supplies and ammunition; he was also anxious to send two of his sloops back to Havana for reinforcements. For these reasons the unloading was pushed rapidly forward. In the meantime he strengthened his position, and sought what information he could obtain of the situation of the French fort from the Indians. They told him that it could be reached from the head of the harbor of St. Augustine, without going by sea, probably indicating a way by North River and Pablo Creek.

On September 11 Menéndez wrote from St. Augustine his report to the King of the progress of the expedition. In this first letter written from the soil of Florida, Menéndez sought to provide against those difficulties which had proved the chief obstacle to both the French and Spanish colonies before him.

In two days the ships were for the most part unloaded, yet Menéndez was convinced that Ribault would return as soon as possible, so that the San Pelayo did not wait to discharge its entire cargo, but set sail for Hispaniola at midnight on September 10, with the San Salvador, which was carrying the admiral's dispatches. The San Pelayo took with her some passengers who proved to be of concern to the zealous Catholics. On leaving Cádiz, Menéndez had been informed by the Seville Inquisition that there were "Lutherans" in his fleet, and, having made an investigation, he discovered and seized twenty-five of them, whom he dispatched in the two vessels to Santo Domingo or Puerto Rico, to be returned to Spain.

At the very time Menéndez was killing "Lutherans" in Florida, the "Lutherans" aboard the San Pelayo, convinced of the fate which awaited them in Seville, rose against their captors. They killed the captain, master, and all the Catholics aboard, and made their way past Spain, France, and Flanders, to the coast of Denmark, where the San Pelayo was wrecked and the heretics appear finally to have escaped. Menéndez also sent two sloops to Havana for the reinforcements expected to arrive with Esteban de las Alas, and for horses. He especially counted upon the latter in his campaign against the French, as he had lost all but one of those he had shipped in from Puerto Rico.

Meanwhile, the French at Fort Caroline had remained without news of the outcome of the attack. But on the reappearance of two of his vessels at the mouth of the St. Johns, Ribault went down the river to learn what had happened. He met on his way out a boatload of men returning from one of the ships, who told him of their encounter with the Spaniards, and informed him that they had seen three of the enemy's ships in the River of Dolphins and two more in the roads, where the Spaniards had disembarked and were fortifying their position.

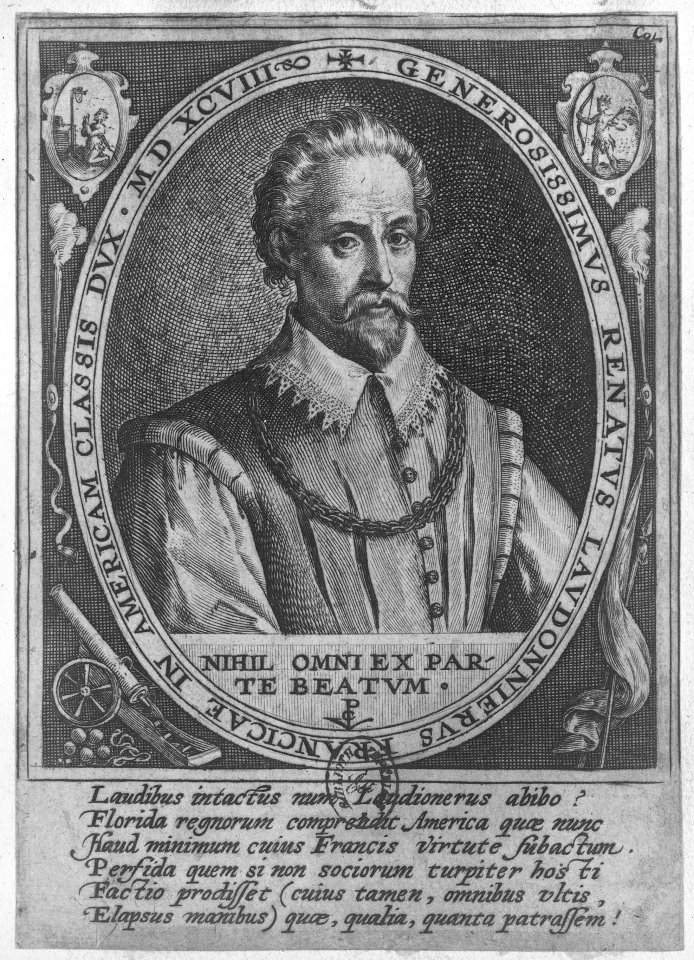
Engraved portrait of René de Laudonnière by Crispin de Passe the Elder

Ribault returned at once to the fort and, entering the chamber of Laudonnière, who lay there sick, proposed in his presence and that of the assembled captains and other gentlemen, to embark at once with all of his forces in the four ships which lay in the harbor, for the Trinity had not yet returned, and to seek the Spanish fleet. Laudonnière, who was familiar with the sudden storms to which the region was subject during September, disapproved of his plan, pointing out the danger to which the French ships would be exposed of being driven out to sea, and the defenseless condition in which Fort Caroline would be left. The captains, who had received from a neighboring chief confirmation of the landing of the Spaniards and of the defenses which they were erecting, also advised against Ribault's plan, and counselled him at least to await the return of the Trinity before executing it. But Ribault persisted in his plan, showed the unwilling Laudonnière Coligny's instructions, and proceeded to carry it into effect. Not only did he take all of his own men with him, but carried off thirty-eight of the garrison and Laudonnière's ensign, leaving behind his treasurer, the Sieur de Lys, with the sick lieutenant in charge of the depleted garrison.

On September 8, the very day that Menéndez was taking possession of Florida in the name of Philip, Ribault embarked aboard his fleet, but waited two days in the harbor until he had prevailed upon Captain François Léger de La Grange to accompany him, although La Grange was so distrustful of the enterprise that he wished to remain with Laudonnière. On September 10, Ribault sailed away.

If the muster-roll of Laudonnière is accurate, the garrison which Ribault left behind him to defend Fort Caroline was ill-fitted to resist an attack of the well-fed and well-disciplined Spanish soldiery. The total number of colonists remaining in the fort was about two hundred and forty. Three days passed without any news of Ribault, and with each passing day Laudonnière became more anxious. Knowing the proximity of the Spaniards, and dreading a sudden descent upon the fort, he resolved to make shift for his own defense. Although food stores were depleted, as Ribault had carried off two of his boats with the meal which had been left over after making the biscuit for the return to France, and although Laudonnière himself was reduced to the rations of a common soldier, he yet commanded the allowance to be increased in order to lift the morale of his men. He also set to work to repair the palisade which had been torn down to supply material for the ships, but continued storms hindered the work, which was never completed.

=== Destruction of Fort Caroline ===
The French flag of the 1500s that flew over Fort Caroline

==== Ribault's attempted assault on St. Augustine foiled by storm ====
Ribault made at once for St. Augustine with two hundred sailors and four hundred soldiers, which included the best men of the garrison at Fort Caroline. At dawn the next day he came upon Menéndez in the very act of attempting to pass the bar and to land a sloop and two boats filled with men and artillery from the San Salvador which had sailed at midnight with the San Pelayo. The tide was out and his boats so loaded that only by great skill was he able to cross it with his sloop, and escape; for the French, who had at once attempted to prevent his landing and thus to capture his cannon and the supplies he had on board, got so close to him, that they hailed him, and summoned him to surrender, promising that no harm should befall him. As soon as Ribault perceived that the boats had gotten out of his reach, he gave up the attempt and started in pursuit of the San Salvador, which was already six or eight leagues away.

Two days later, in confirmation of Laudonnière's forebodings, so violent a norther arose that the Indians themselves declared it to be the worst they had ever seen on the coast. Menéndez at once realized that the proper moment had presented itself for an attack upon the fort. Calling his captains together, a mass was said to bring him sagacity in forming his plans, and then he addressed them with words of encouragement.

He then set before them the advantage which the moment presented for an attack upon Fort Caroline, with its defenses weakened by the absence of Ribault who might have taken the best part of its garrison with him, and Ribault's inability to return against the contrary wind, which in his judgment would continue for some days. His plan was to reach the fort through the forest and to attack it. If his approach was discovered, he proposed, on reaching the margin of the woods which surrounded the open meadow where it stood, to display the banners in such a way as to lead the French to believe that his force was two thousand strong. A trumpeter should then be sent to summon them to surrender, in which case the garrison should be sent back to France, and, if they did not, put to the knife. In the event of failure the Spaniards would have become acquainted with the way, and could await at St. Augustine the arrival of reinforcements in March. Although his plan failed to meet with general approval at first, it was finally agreed upon, and so it came about that Menéndez was able to write to the King in his letter of October 15 that his captains had approved his plan.

==== Spanish expedition sets out ====
Menéndez's preparations were made promptly; he placed his brother Bartolomé in charge of the fort at St. Augustine, in case of the return of the French fleet. He then selected a company of five hundred men, three hundred of whom were arquebusiers and the remainder pikemen (soldiers armed with muzzle-loading firearms and with spears) and targeteers (men armed with swords and buckler shields). On September 16 the force assembled at the call of trumpets, drums, fifes, and the ringing of the bells. After hearing mass, it set out, each man carrying on his back his arms, a bottle of wine, and six pounds of biscuit, in which Menéndez himself set the example. Two Indian chiefs, whose hostility the French had incurred, and who had visited Fort Caroline six days before, accompanied the party to show the way. A picked company of twenty Asturians and Basques under their captain, Martin de Ochoa, led the way armed with axes with which they blazed a path through the forest and swamps for the men behind them, guided by Menéndez who carried a compass to find the right direction.

The point of land on which Fort Caroline was situated is separated from the seacoast by an extensive swamp through which flows Pablo Creek, which rises a few miles from the head of North River. It was necessary for the Spaniards to go around this, for all of the creeks and rivers were full and the lowlands flooded owing to the continued rains. At no time was the water lower than up to their knees. No boats were taken along, so the soldiers swam the various creeks and streams, Menéndez taking the lead with a pike in his hand at the very first one they encountered. Those who could not swim were carried across on the pikes. It was extremely fatiguing work, for "the rains continued as constant and heavy as if the world was again to be overwhelmed with a flood." Their clothes became soaked and heavy with water, their food as well, the powder wet, and the cords of the arquebuses worthless, and some of the men began to grumble, but Menéndez pretended not to hear. The vanguard selected the place for the night encampment, but it was difficult to find high ground on account of the flood. During their halts fires were built, but when within a day's march of Fort Caroline, even this was forbidden, for fear it would betray their approach to the enemy.

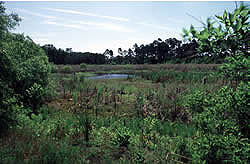
Five hundred Spanish soldiers marched four days through marsh, forest tangle, fierce winds, and heavy rainfall to an encampment near Fort Caroline. This is where Menéndez and his men camped, exhausted and weary, the night before the attack on and capture of the fort.

Thus the Spaniards pushed on for two days through the woods, streams, and swamps, without a trail to follow. On the evening of the third day, September 19, Menéndez reached the neighborhood of the fort. The night was stormy and the rain fell so heavily that he thought he could approach it without being discovered, and encamped for the night in the pine grove on the edge of a pond within less than a quarter of a league from it. The spot he had chosen was marshy; in places the water stood up to the belts of the soldiers, and no fire could be lighted for fear of revealing their presence to the French.

Inside Fort Caroline, La Vigne was keeping watch with his company, but taking pity on his sentinels, wet and fatigued with the heavy rain, he let them leave their stations with the approach of day, and finally he himself retired to his own quarters. With the break of day on September 20, the feast of St. Matthew, Menéndez was already alert. Before dawn he held a consultation with his captains, after which the entire party knelt down and prayed for a victory over their enemies. Then he set out for the fort over the narrow path which led to it from the woods. A French prisoner, Jean Francois, led the way, his hands bound behind him, and the end of the rope held by Menéndez himself.

==== Menéndez's attack ====
In the darkness the Spaniards soon lost the path in crossing a marsh with water up to their knees, and were compelled to wait until daybreak in order to find the way again. When morning came, Menéndez set out in the direction of the fort, and on reaching a slight elevation Francois announced that Fort Caroline lay just beyond, down on the river's edge. Then the camp master, Pedro Valdez y Menéndez, son-in-law of Pedro Menéndez de Avilés, and the Asturian, Ochoa, went forward to reconnoitre. They were hailed by a man they took to be a sentinel. "Who goes there?" he cried. "Frenchmen," they answered, and, closing upon him, Ochoa struck him in the face with his knife, which he had not unsheathed. The Frenchman warded off the blow with his sword, but in stepping back to avoid a thrust from Valdez he tripped, fell backwards, and began shouting. Then Ochoa stabbed him and killed him. Menéndez, hearing the shouting, thought that Valdez and Ochoa were being slain, and cried out "Santiago, at them! God is helping! Victory! the French are killed! The camp master is inside the fort and has taken it," and the entire force rushed down the path. On the way two Frenchmen whom they met were killed.

Some of the Frenchmen living in the outbuildings set up a shout on seeing two of their number killed, at which a man within the fort opened the wicket of the main entrance to admit the fugitives. The camp master closed with him and killed him, and the Spaniards poured into the enclosure. Laudonnière's trumpeter had just mounted the rampart, and seeing the Spaniards coming towards him sounded the alarm. The French—most of whom were still asleep in their beds—taken entirely by surprise, came running out of their quarters into the driving rain, some half-dressed, and others quite naked. Among the first was Laudonnière, who rushed out of his quarters in his shirt, his sword and shield in his hands, and began to call his soldiers together. But the enemy had been too quick for them, and the wet and muddy courtyard was soon covered with the blood of the French cut down by the Spanish soldiers, who now filled it. At Laudonnière's call, some of his men had hastened to the breach on the south side, where lay the ammunition and the artillery. But they were met by a party of Spaniards who repulsed and killed them, and who finally raised their standards in triumph upon the walls. Another party of Spaniards entered by a similar breach on the west, overwhelming the soldiers who attempted to resist them there, and also planted their ensigns on the rampart.

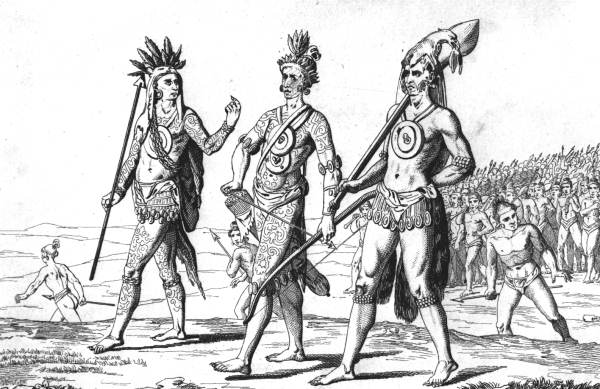
Timucua warriors with weapons and tattoo regalia, drawn by Jacques Le Moyne, c. 1562

Jacques Le Moyne, the artist, still lame in one leg from a wound he had received in the campaign against the Timucua chief Outina, was roused from his sleep by the outcries and sound of blows proceeding from the courtyard. Seeing that it had been turned into a slaughter pen by the Spaniards who now held it, he fled at once, passing over the dead bodies of five or six of his fellow-soldiers, leaped down into the ditch, and escaped into the neighboring wood. Menéndez had remained outside urging his troops on to the attack, but when he saw a sufficient number of them advance, he ran to the front, shouting out that under pain of death no women were to be killed, nor any boys less than fifteen years of age.

Menéndez had headed the attack on the south-west breach, and after repulsing its defenders, he came upon Laudonnière, who was running to their assistance. Jean Francois, the renegade Frenchman, pointed him out to the Spaniards, and their pikemen drove him back into the court. Seeing that the place was lost, and unable to stand up alone against his aggressors, Laudonnière turned to escape through his house. The Spaniards pursued him, but he escaped by the western breach.

Meanwhile, the trumpeters were announcing a victory from their stations on the ramparts beside the flags. At this the Frenchmen who remained alive entirely lost heart, and while the main body of the Spaniards were going through the quarters, killing the old, the sick, and the infirm, quite a number of the French succeeded in getting over the palisade and escaping. Some of the fugitives made their way into the forest. Jacques Ribault with his ship the Pearl, and another vessel with a cargo of wine and supplies, were anchored in the river but a very short distance from the fort and rescued others who rowed out in a couple of boats; and some even swam the distance to the ships.

By this time the fort was virtually won, and Menéndez turned his attention to the vessels anchored in the neighborhood. A number of women and children had been spared and his thoughts turned to how he could rid himself of them. His decision was promptly reached. A trumpeter with a flag of truce was sent to summon someone to come ashore from the ships to treat of conditions of surrender. Receiving no response, he sent Jean Francois to the Pearl with the proposal that the French should have a safe-conduct to return to France with the women and children in any one vessel they should select, provided they would surrender their remaining ships and all of their armament.

But Jacques Ribault would listen to no such terms, and on his refusal, Menéndez turned the guns of the captured fort against Ribault and succeeded in sinking one of the vessels in shallow water, where it could be recovered without damage to the cargo. Jacques Ribault received the crew of the sinking ship into the Pearl, and then dropped a league down the river to where stood two more of the ships which had arrived from France, and which had not even been unloaded. Hearing from the carpenter, Jean de Hais, who had escaped in a small boat, of the taking of the fort, Jacques Ribault decided to remain a little longer in the river to see if he might save any of his compatriots.

==== Massacre of the French garrison at Fort Caroline ====
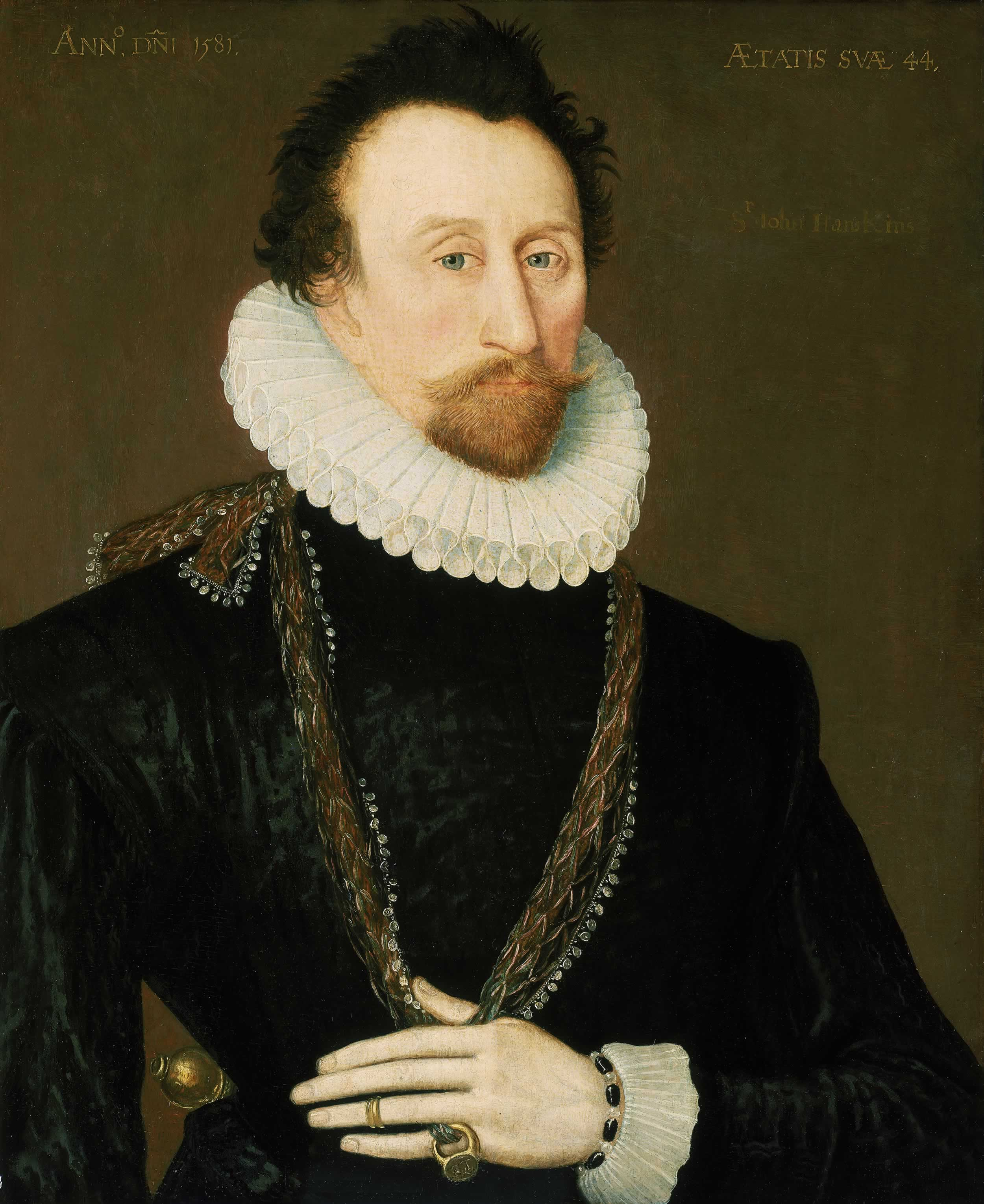
Sir John Hawkins

So successful had been the attack that the victory was won within an hour without loss to the Spaniards of a single man, and only one was wounded. Of the two hundred and forty French in the fort, one hundred and thirty-two were killed outright, including the two English hostages left by Hawkins. About half a dozen drummers and trumpeters were held as prisoners, of which number was Jean Memyn, who later wrote a short account of his experiences; fifty women and children were captured, and the balance of the garrison got away.

In a work written in France some seven years later, and first published in 1586, it is related that Menéndez hanged some of his prisoners on trees and placed above them the Spanish inscription, "I do this not to Frenchmen, but to Lutherans." The story found ready acceptance among the French of that period, and was believed and repeated subsequently by historians, both native and foreign, but it is unsupported by the testimony of a single eyewitness.

Throughout the attack the storm had continued and the rain had poured down, so that it was no small comfort to the weary soldiers when Jean Francois pointed out to them the storehouse, where they all obtained dry clothes, and where a ration of bread and wine with lard and pork was served out to each of them. Most of the food stores were looted by the soldiers. Menéndez found five or six thousand ducats' worth of silver, largely ore, part of it brought by the Indians from the Appalachian Mountains, and part collected by Laudonnière from Outina, from whom he had also obtained some gold and pearls. Most of the artillery and ammunition brought over by Ribault had not been landed, and as Laudonnière had traded his with Hawkins for the ship, little was captured.

Menéndez further captured eight ships, one of which was a galley in the dockyard; of the remaining seven, five were French, including the vessel sunk in the attack, the other two were those captured off Yaguana, whose cargoes of hides and sugar Hawkins had taken with him. In the afternoon Menéndez assembled his captains, and after pointing out how grateful they should be to God for the victory, called the roll of his men, and found only four hundred present, many having already started on their way back to St. Augustine.

Menéndez wanted to return at once, anticipating a descent of the French fleet upon his settlement there. He also wished to attempt the capture of Jacques Ribault's ships before they left the St. Johns, and to get ready a vessel to transport the women and children of the French to Santo Domingo, and from there to Seville.

He appointed Gonzalo de Villarroel harbormaster and governor of the district and put the fort, which he had named San Mateo, under his supervision, having captured it on the feast of St. Matthew. The camp master, Valdez, who had proved his courage in the attack, and a garrison of three hundred men were left to defend the fort; the arms of France were torn down from over the main entrance and replaced by the Spanish royal arms surmounted by a cross. The device was painted by two Flemish soldiers in his detachment. Then two crosses were erected inside the fort, and a location was selected for a church to be dedicated to St. Matthew.

When Menéndez looked about for an escort he found his soldiers so exhausted with the wet march, the sleepless nights, and the battle, that not a man was found willing to accompany him. He therefore determined to remain overnight and then to proceed to St. Augustine in advance of the main body of his men with a picked company of thirty-five of those who were least fatigued.

=== Laudonnaire's escape from Fort Caroline ===
The fate of the French fugitives from Fort Caroline was various and eventful. When Laudonnière reached the forest, he found there a party of men who had escaped like himself, and three or four of whom were badly wounded. A consultation was held as to what steps should be taken, for it was impossible to remain where they were for any length of time, without food, and exposed at every moment to an attack from the Spaniards. Some of the party determined to take refuge among the natives, and set out for a neighboring Indian village. These were subsequently ransomed by Menéndez and returned by him to France.

Laudonnière then pushed on through the woods, where his party was increased the following day by that of the artist, Jacques Le Moyne. Wandering along one of the forest paths with which he was familiar, Le Moyne had come upon four other fugitives like himself. After consultation together the party broke up, Le Moyne going in the direction of the sea to find Ribault's boats, and the others making for an Indian settlement. Le Moyne finally, while still in the forest, came upon the party of Laudonnière. Laudonnière had taken the direction of the sea in the evident hope of finding the vessels Ribault had sent inside the bar. After a while the marshes were reached, "Where," he wrote, "being able to go no farther by reason of my sicknesse which I had, I sent two of my men which were with me, which could swim well, unto the ships to advertise them of that which had happened, and to send them word to come and helpe me. They were not able that day to get unto the ships to certifie them thereof: so I was constrained to stand in the water up to the shoulders all of that night long, with one of my men which would never forsake me."

Then came the old carpenter, Le Challeux, with another party of refugees, through the water and the tall grass. Le Challeux and six others of the company decided to make their way to the coast in the hope of being rescued by the ships which had remained below in the river. They passed the night in a grove of trees in view of the sea, and the following morning, as they were struggling through a large swamp, they observed some men half hidden by the vegetation, whom they took to be a party of Spaniards come down to cut them off. But closer observation showed that they were naked, and terrified like themselves, and when they recognized their leader, Laudonnière, and others of their companions, they joined them. The entire company now consisted of twenty-six.

Two men were sent to the top of the highest trees from which they discovered one of the smaller of the French ships, that of Captain Maillard, which presently sent a boat to their rescue. The boat next went to the relief of Laudonnière, who was so sick and weak that he had to be carried to it. Before returning to the ship, the remainder of the company were gathered up; the men, exhausted with hunger and fatigue, had to be assisted into the boat by the sailors.

A consultation was now held between Jacques Ribault and Captain Maillard, and the decision was reached to return to France. But in their weakened state, with their arms and supplies gone and the better part of their crews absent with Jean Ribault, the escaped Frenchmen were unable to navigate all three of the vessels; they therefore selected the two best and sank the other. The armament of the vessel bought from Hawkins was divided between the two captains and the ship was then abandoned. On Thursday, September 25, the two ships set sail for France, but parted company the following day. Jacques Ribault with Le Challeux and his party, after an adventure on the way with a Spanish vessel, ultimately reached [[La Rochelle#French Wars of Religion|]].

The other vessel, with Laudonnière aboard, was driven by foul weather into Swansea Bay in South Wales, where he again fell very ill. Part of his men he sent to France with the boat. With the remainder he went to London, where he saw Monsieur de Foix, the French ambassador, and from there he proceeded to Paris. Finding that the King had gone to Moulins, he finally set out for it with part of his company to make his report, and reached there about the middle of March of the following year.

=== The fate of Ribault's fleet ===
The morning after the capture of Fort Caroline, Menéndez set out on his return to St. Augustine. But he first sent the camp master with a party of fifty men to look for those who had escaped over the palisade, and to reconnoitre the French vessels which were still lying in the river, and whom he suspected of remaining there in order to rescue their compatriots. Twenty fugitives were found in the woods, where they were all shot and killed; that evening the camp master returned to Fort Caroline, having found no more Frenchmen.

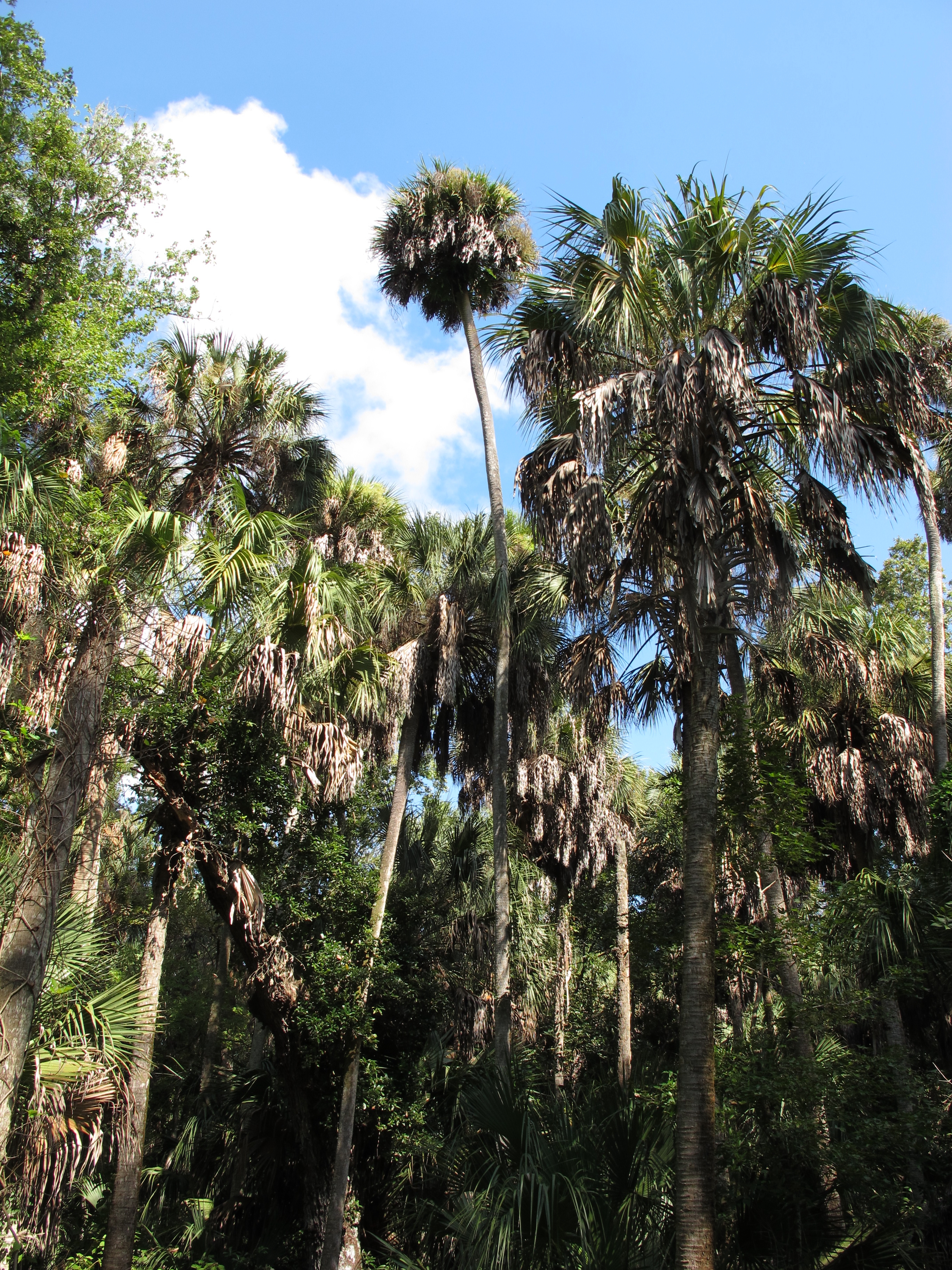
Sabal palmettos grow 70 feet (21 m) to 80 feet (24 m) high, with exceptional individuals up to 92 feet (28 m)

The return to St. Augustine proved even more arduous and dangerous than the journey out. The Spaniards crossed the deeper and larger streams on the trunks of trees which they felled for makeshift bridges. A tall palmetto was climbed, and the trail by which they had come was found. They encamped that night on a bit of dry ground, where a fire was built to dry their soaking garments, but the heavy rain began again.

On September 19, three days after Menéndez had departed from St. Augustine and was encamped with his troops near Fort Caroline, a force of twenty men was sent to his relief with supplies of bread and wine and cheese, but the settlement remained without further news of him. On Saturday some fishermen went down to the beach to cast their nets, where they discovered a man whom they seized and conducted to the fort. He proved to be a member of the crew of one of Jean Ribault's four ships and was in terror of being hung. But the chaplain examined him, and finding that he was "a Christian," of which he gave evidence by reciting the prayers, he was promised his life if he told the truth. His story was that in the storm that arose after the French maneuvers in front of St. Augustine, their frigate had been cast away at the mouth of a river four leagues to the south and five of the crew were drowned. The next morning the survivors had been set upon by the natives and three more had been killed with clubs. Then he and a companion had fled along the shore, walking in the sea with only their heads above the water in order to escape detection by the Indians.

Bartolomé Menéndez sent at once a party to float the frigate off and bring it up to St. Augustine. But when the Spaniards approached the scene of the wreck, the Indians, who had already slaughtered the balance of the crew, drove them away. A second attempt proved more successful and the vessel was brought up to St. Augustine.

The continued absence of news from the expedition against Fort Caroline greatly concerned the Spaniards at St. Augustine. San Vicente, one of the captains who had remained behind, prophesied that Menéndez would never come back, and that the entire party would be killed. This impression was confirmed by the return of a hundred men made desperate by the hardships of the march, who brought with them their version of the difficulty of the attempt. On the afternoon of Monday, the 24th, just after the successful rescue of the French frigate, the settlers saw a man coming towards them, shouting at the top of his lungs. The chaplain went out to meet him, and the man threw his arms around him, crying, "Victory, victory! the harbor of the French is ours!" On reaching St. Augustine, Menéndez at once armed two boats to send to the mouth of the St. Johns after Jacques Ribault, to prevent his reuniting with his father or returning to France with the news of the Spanish attack; but, learning that Jacques had already sailed, he abandoned his plan and dispatched a single vessel with supplies to Fort San Mateo.

=== Massacre at Matanzas Inlet ===
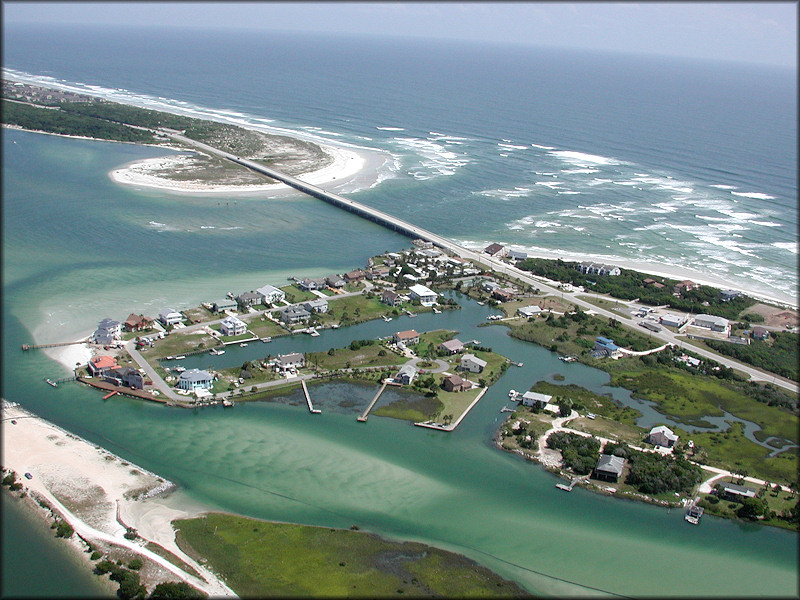
The massacre of the French Huguenots took place at Matanzas Inlet, which in the 16th century was located several hundred yards north of its present location.

Pedro Menéndez founded St. Augustine about 30 miles south of the newly-established French settlement at Fort Caroline on the St. Johns River, and acted aggressively to expel those whom he considered heretics and intruders when he learned of the existence of Fort Caroline. When the French Huguenot leader, Jean Ribault, learned of the Spanish settlement, he also decided on a swift assault and sailed south from Fort Caroline with most of his troops to search for St. Augustine. His ships were struck by a storm and most of his force was lost at sea, leaving Ribault and several hundred survivors shipwrecked with limited food and supplies near Mosquito Inlet (Ponce de Leon Inlet), about 53 miles south of the Spanish colony. Meanwhile, Menendez marched north, overwhelmed the remaining defenders of Fort Caroline, massacred most of the French Protestants in the settlement, and left an occupying force in the rechristened Fort Mateo. Upon returning to St. Augustine, he received news that Ribault and his troops in two separate parties were stranded to the south, and he moved quickly to attack. After finding the stranded Frenchmen, he massacred them on the shore of what became known as the Matanzas River, sparing only the Catholics among the French.

== Aftermath ==
The Indians, who had been particularly friendly with the French, resented the Spanish invasion and the cruelty of Menéndez, and led by their chief Saturiwa, made war upon the Spanish settlers. The latter were running short of provisions and mutinied during the absence of Menéndez, who had gone back to Cuba for relief, and who finally had to seek it from the King in person in 1567.

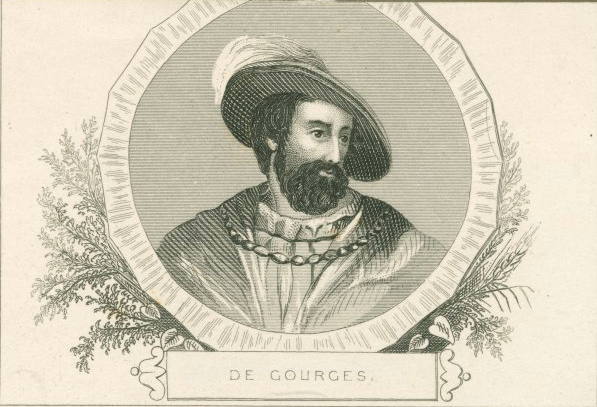
Dominique de Gourgues, captain in King Charles IX's army and avenger of the Spanish massacre of Fort Caroline

Laudonnière and his companions, who had safely reached France, had spread exaggerated accounts of the atrocities visited by the Spanish on the unfortunate Huguenots at Fort Caroline. The French royal court took no measures to avenge them despite the nationwide outrage. This was reserved for Dominique de Gourgues, a nobleman who earlier had been taken prisoner by the Spaniards and consigned to the galleys. From this servitude he had been rescued, and finally returned to France, from where he made a profitable excursion to the South Seas. Then with the assistance of influential friends, he fitted out an expedition for Africa, from which he took a cargo of slaves to Cuba, and sold them to the Spaniards.

When news of the massacre at Fort Caroline reached France, an enraged and vengeful De Gourgues fitted out three warships and recruited more than 200 men. From this point he sailed in 1568 for Cuba and then Florida, aided by some Spanish deserters. His force readily entered into the scheme of attacking Fort San Mateo, as Fort Caroline had been renamed by the Spaniards. As his galleys passed the Spanish battery at the fort, they saluted his ships, mistaking them for a convoy of their own. De Gourgues returned the salute to continue the deception, then sailed further up the coast and anchored near what would later become the port of Fernandina. One of De Gourgues's men was sent ashore to arouse the Indians against the Spaniards. The Indians were delighted at the prospect of revenge, and their chief, Saturiwa, promised to "have all his warriors in three days ready for the warpath." This was done, and the combined forces moved on and overpowered the Spanish fort, which was speedily taken. Most in San Mateo were killed by the French and Native forces, and De Gourgues hanged captured Spaniards where Menéndez had slaughtered the Huguenots, reportedly under a sign that read "I do this not as to Spaniards, but as to Traitors, Robbers, and Murderers". He did not attempt to reestablish a French colony, however, and instead destroyed the fort and withdrew before Spanish forces could arrive from St. Augustine or Cuba.

Menéndez was chagrined upon his return to Florida; however, he maintained order among his troops, and after fortifying St. Augustine as the headquarters of the Spanish colony, sailed home to use his influence in the royal court for their welfare. Before he could execute his plans he died of a fever in 1574.

== See also ==
- Huguenots
- Spanish Florida
