= Governor Manrique =

Governor Manrique may refer to:

- José Manrique (fl. 1800s–1810s), Governor of New Mexico from 1808 to 1814
- Mateo González Manrique (fl. 1810s), Governor of West Florida from 1813 to 1815

== See also ==
- Hernando de Manrique de Rojas (fl. 1570s), Spanish colonial governor of the Colony of Santiago (Jamaica) around 1575
