= French Florida =

French Huguenot colony (1562–1565)

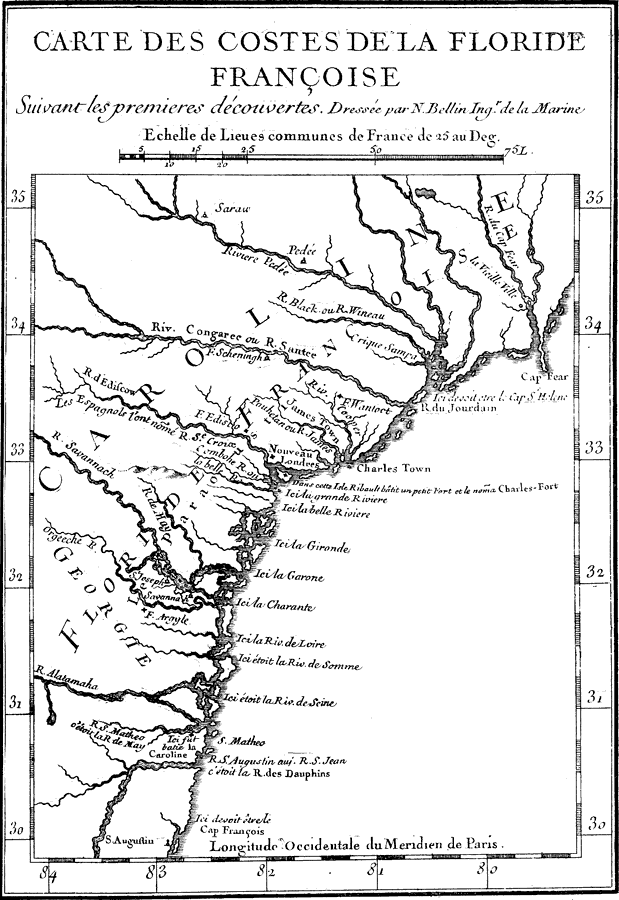
French Florida in 1562, by N. Bellin, 18th century

French Florida (Middle French: Floride françoise; Modern French: Floride française) was a colonial territory established by French Huguenot colonists as part of New France in what is now Florida and South Carolina between 1562 and 1565.

French Huguenot leader and Admiral of France Gaspard de Coligny envisaged the establishment of New World colonies as a safe haven for his persecuted Protestant coreligionists. The first such attempt was an establishment in Brazil, named France Antarctique.

A first landing in Florida was made by Jean Ribault, and a second by René Goulaine de Laudonnière in 1562, before moving north where he set up Charlesfort, on Parris Island, South Carolina. Charlesfort was abandoned by all colonists, save one, the following year due to hardship and internal conflicts, and they sailed back to France.

In 1564, René Goulaine de Laudonnière again traveled from France, this time to establish Fort Caroline, in what is now Jacksonville.

The French establishment was wiped out by the Spaniards in 1565. With the capture of Fort Caroline, Huguenots either fled into the mainland or were killed in the subsequent massacre at Matanzas Inlet.

In 1568, Dominique de Gourgues further explored the area, and, with the help of his allies the Saturiwa Indians, massacred the Spanish garrison in retaliation, but he did not capitalize on this action.

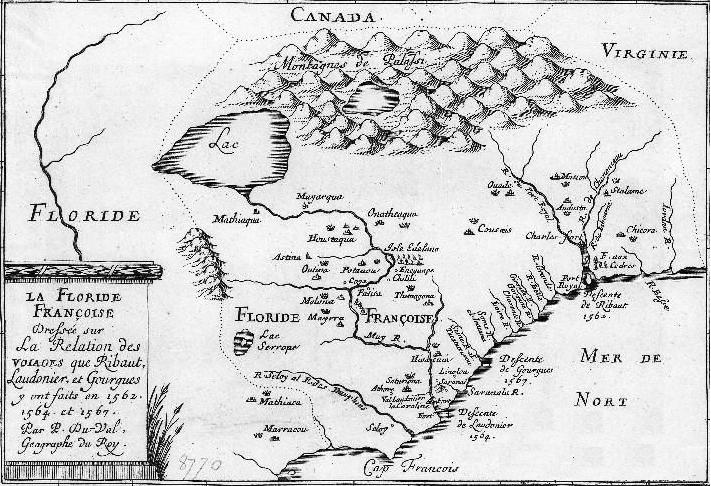
Floride françoise ("French Florida"), by Pierre du Val, 17th century

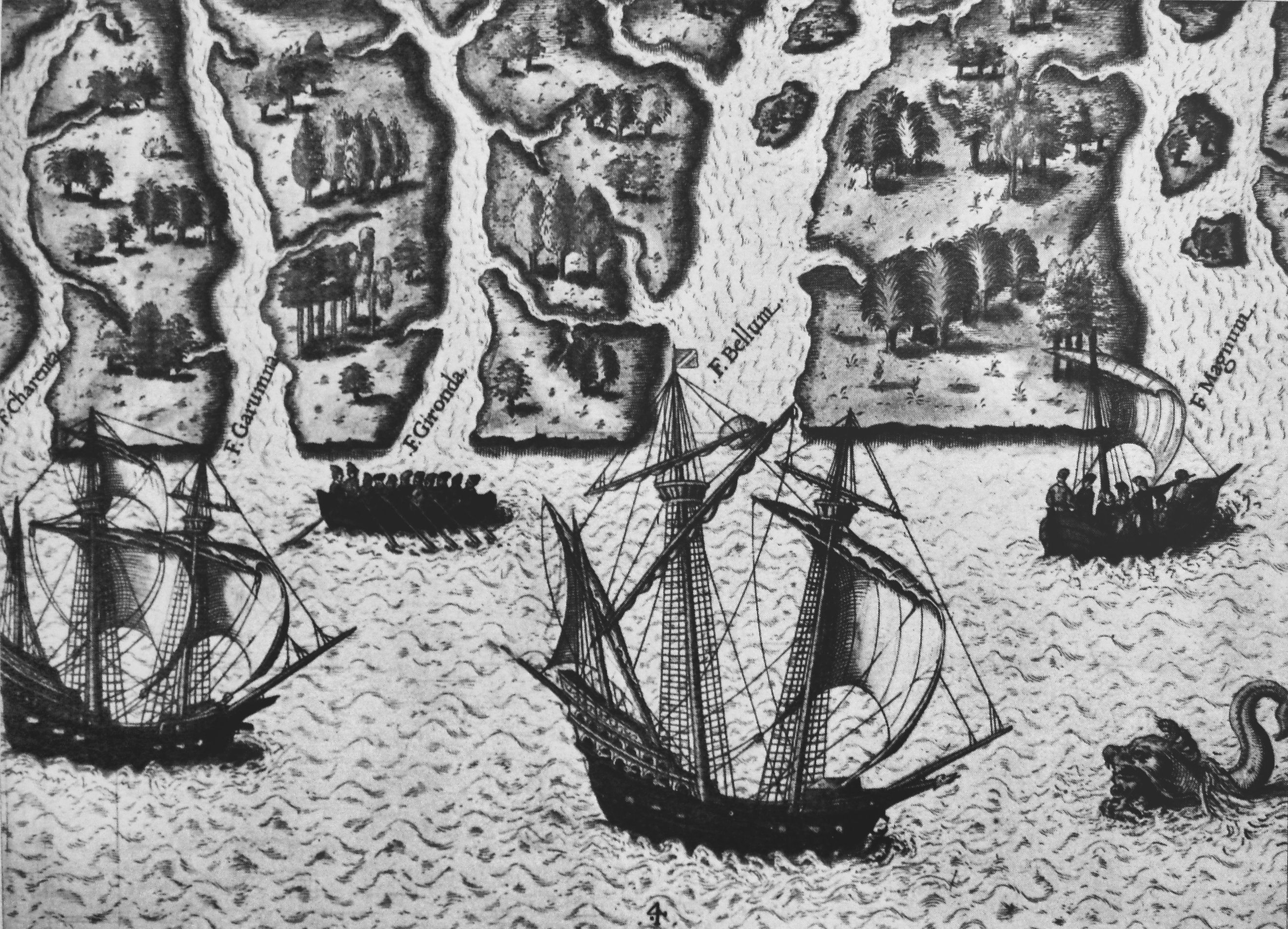
Exploration of Florida by Ribault and Laudonniere, 1564, by Le Moyne de Morgues

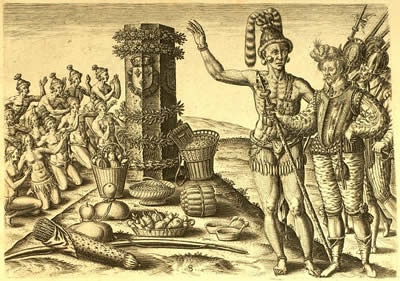
Athore, son of the Timucuan king Saturiwa, showing Laudonnière the monument placed by Jean Ribault in 1562

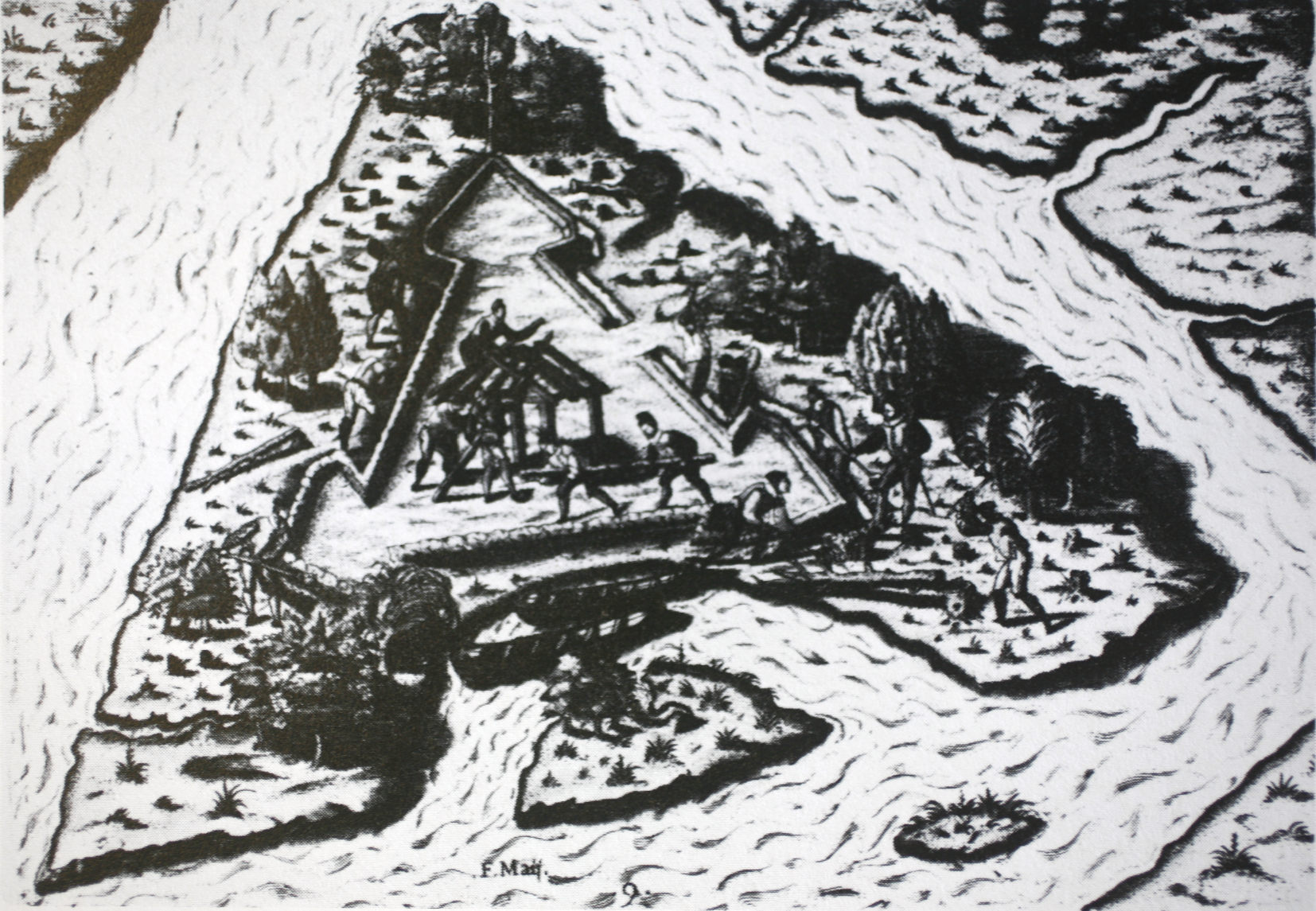
Foundation of Fort Caroline

== See also ==
- France Equinoxiale
- France-Americas relations
- Raimond Beccarie de Pavie, Seigneur de Fourquevaux
- Charlesfort (1562–1563)
- Fort Caroline (1564–1565)
- Spanish assault on French Florida (1565)
