= René Goulaine de Laudonnière =

French Huguenot explorer

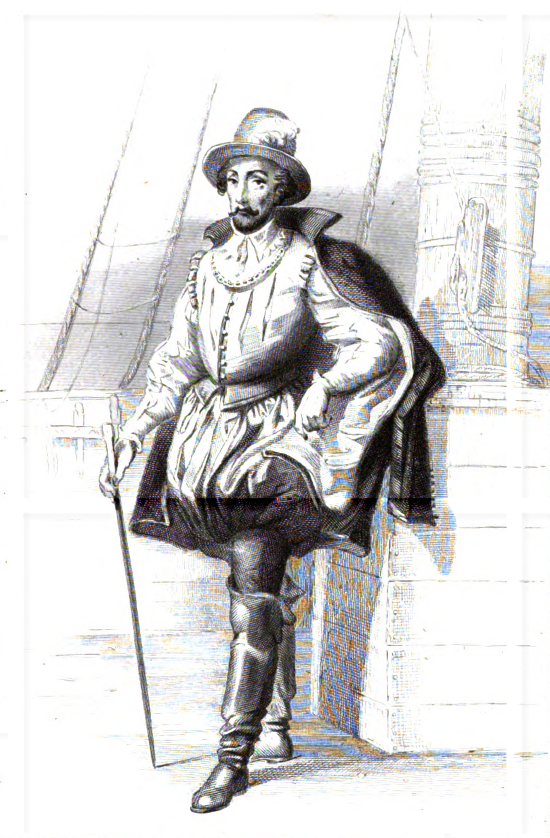
Laudonnière, as depicted in 1846

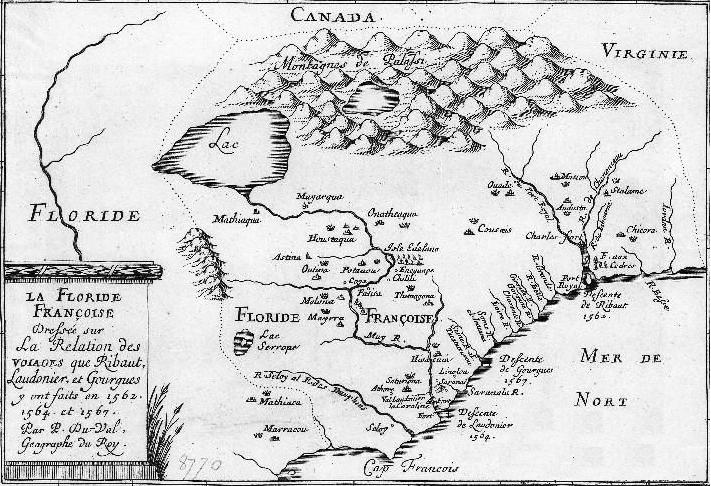
La Floride françoise (French Florida), by Pierre du Val, 17th century.

René Goulaine de Laudonnière (French pronunciation: [ʁəne ɡulɛn də lodɔnjɛʁ]; c. 1529–1574) was a French Huguenot explorer and the founder of the French colony of Fort Caroline in what is now Jacksonville, Florida. Admiral Gaspard de Coligny, a Huguenot, sent Jean Ribault and Laudonnière to explore potential sites in Florida suitable for settlement by the French Protestants.

== Biography ==
Laudonnière was a Huguenot nobleman and merchant mariner from Poitou, France. His birthdate and family origins are currently unknown. One school of historians attaches him to a branch of the Goulaine family seated at Laudonnière, near Nantes. A competing claim insists that he was a Burdigale (or Bourdigalle) from the port town of Sables d'Olonne. No contemporary records have been published to substantiate either theory.

In 1562, Laudonnière was appointed second in command of the Huguenot expedition to Florida under Jean Ribault. Leaving in February 1562, the expedition returned home in July after establishing the small settlement of Charlesfort in present-day South Carolina.

After the French Wars of Religion broke out between French Catholics and Huguenots, Ribault fled France and sought refuge in England. Meanwhile, the Huguenots planned another expedition to Florida and Laudonnière was placed in command in Ribault's absence. In 1564 Laudonniere received 50,000 crowns from Charles IX and returned to Florida with three ships and 300 Huguenot colonists.

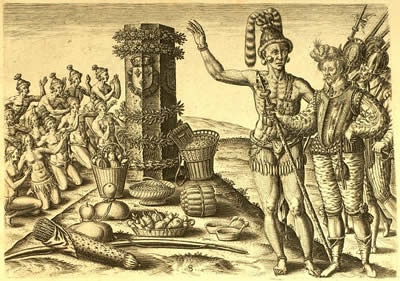
Athore, son of the Timucuan king Saturiwa, showing Laudonnière the monument placed by Ribault in 1562.

Laudonnière arrived at the mouth of the May River (today called the St. Johns River) on 22 June 1564. He sailed up the river where he eventually founded Fort Caroline, which they named for King Charles, in what is now Jacksonville. He made contact with the Saturiwa, a Timucua chiefdom who were friendly to the colonists and showed them a shrine they had built around a monument left behind by Ribault. When some of the men complained about the manual labor, Laudonnière sent them back to France.

A small group of deserters stole a barque from the colony and sailed to Cuba to conduct raids on Spanish colonists there. One of these deserters who was captured by the Spanish, Francois Jean, later betrayed his countrymen and led Pedro Menéndez de Avilés to Fort Caroline for the first massacre of the colonists.

The colony did not flourish and had to get food from the Timucua. Unsatisfied with the amount of food the Huguenots obtained from the Timucua through barter, Laudonnière sent a group of fifty of his men to kidnap the Timucuan leader Chief Outina and his son and demanded food as ransom.

On 3 August 1565 Laudonnière bought food and a ship from passing privateer John Hawkins so he could ship the colonists back to France. While he was waiting for a favorable wind, Jean Ribault arrived with 600 more settlers and soldiers on September 10. Ribault informed Laudonnière that he had been relieved of his authority, but offered him an informal co-regency over the colony. This arrangement was unacceptable to Laudonnière, who resolved to return to France.

Events interrupted Laudonnière's departure when a Spanish fleet commanded by Adelantado Pedro Menéndez de Avilés appeared. Spain based her long-standing claim to Florida on the voyage of discovery of Juan Ponce de León in 1513, as well as four other expeditions of exploration. Menéndez, one of the foremost naval officers of his day, had been sent out by King Philip II of Spain with a fleet and 800 Spanish settlers with specific instructions to remove the French Protestants from Florida. Menéndez's fleet attempted to grapple and board Ribault's ships just off the mouth of the St. Johns River, but sea conditions denied success to both combatants. The Spanish admiral sailed 40 miles (64 km) south to the next deep inlet on the Atlantic Florida coast. Spanish troops disembarked on 28 August 1565 near the Timucua Indian village of Seloy and hastily threw up some field fortifications, anticipating a French attack. Ribault set sail southward on 10 September 1565, taking most of the soldiers with him to attack the newly established Spanish earthworks-and-palm-log camp at St Augustine. He left Laudonnière with 100 men but only 20 soldiers.

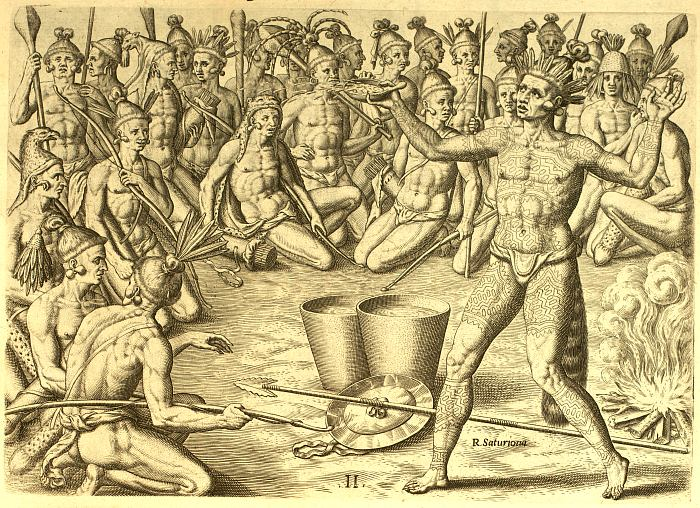
One of Theodor de Bry's engravings, supposedly based on drawings by Jacques LeMoyne, depicting Chief Saturiwa preparing his men for battle.

During a hurricane, Ménendez had sent Spanish troops marching 40 miles (64 km) north overland to attack Fort Caroline on the night of 20 September. They overwhelmed the lightly defended Huguenot garrison and killed most of the male colonists, about 140, both armed and unarmed (in nightshirts); about 60 women and children were spared. Laudonnière and 40-50 others managed to escape. He made his way to the river's mouth, where Ribault's son was anchored with three ships. He set sail in the younger Ribault's company but eventually headed home on a lone vessel, unexpectedly landing in Wales.

Meanwhile, Jean Ribault's fleet ran into the same hurricane that had bedeviled the Spanish approach to Fort Caroline. The storm drove the French squadron many miles south toward present-day Daytona Beach, destroying all the warships. Ribault and hundreds of other survivors washed ashore, and began to walk north along the beach. At Matanzas Inlet, a Spanish patrol encountered the remnants of the French force, and took them prisoner. Following the king of Spain's express edict, all heretics were taken behind a sand dune and put to the sword. The few confessing Catholics and the young musicians were spared their lives. Ribault was executed, along with about 350 of his men. By mid-October 1565, the military power of France on the Florida coast had been obliterated, in accord with the wishes of Philip II of Spain.

Traveling overland via Bristol and London, Laudonnière probably reached Paris in December 1565. After reporting to the royal Court at Moulins, Laudonnière faded from the historical picture. Several years later he emerged as a merchant mariner in 1572 at La Rochelle. He evaded the St. Bartholomew's Day Massacre of Huguenots, and died at St. Germain-en-Laye in 1574. His memoirs, L'histoire notable de la Floride, contenant les trois voyages faits en icelles par des capitaines et pilotes français, were published in 1586.
