= Jean Ribault =

French navigator and colonizer (1520-1565)

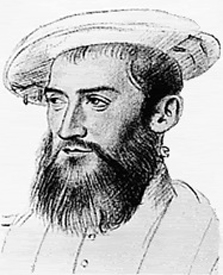
- Born: 1520; Dieppe, Kingdom of France
- Died: October 12, 1565 (aged 44–45); St. Augustine, Florida
- Occupations: Naval officer, explorer

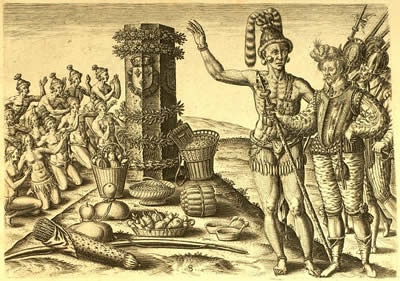
Athore, son of the Timucuan king Saturiwa, showing Laudonnière the monument placed by Ribault.

Jean Ribault (also spelled Ribaut) (1520 – October 12, 1565) was a French naval officer, navigator, and a colonizer of what would become the southeastern United States. He was a major figure in the French attempts to colonize Florida. A Huguenot and officer under Admiral Gaspard de Coligny, Ribault led an expedition to the New World in 1562 that founded the outpost of Charlesfort on Parris Island in present-day South Carolina. Two years later, he took over command of the French colony of Fort Caroline in what is now Jacksonville, Florida. He and many of his followers died at the hands of Spanish soldiers during the Massacre at Matanzas Inlet, near St. Augustine.

== Biography ==
=== Early life and first colony ===
Ribault was born in the town of Dieppe in Normandy in 1520. He entered the French navy under the command of the Huguenot admiral Gaspard de Coligny. In 1562 Coligny chose him to lead an expedition to the New World to found a colony. Ribault left France on February 18 with a fleet of 150 colonists. A recently discovered document suggests that they were guided to Florida by Portuguese pilot Bartolomeu Borges. After crossing the Atlantic, they explored the mouth of the St. Johns River in modern-day Jacksonville, Florida. He named it the "River May", as this was the month when he found it, and erected a stone column claiming the territory for France. Ribault's fleet then proceeded north, charting more of the coastline and noting several rivers. Eventually, they came to the Port Royal Sound in present-day South Carolina, and Ribault elected to establish a settlement on Parris Island, one of the Sea Islands off the coast. Ribault oversaw the layout of a small fort, which was named Charlesfort in honor of the French king Charles IX. Ribault left 27 men under the command of Albert de la Pierria to man the fort and soon set sail for France.

Ribault's intention was to collect supplies for Charlesfort and return by the end of the year. When he arrived at Le Havre, however, he discovered the French Wars of Religion had broken out between the Catholic majority and the Protestant Huguenots. Ribault assisted the Huguenots at Dieppe but was forced to flee to England when the city fell. While in England, he managed to gain an audience with Queen Elizabeth I and organized some backers for a plan to settle in America. However, despite this cordial welcome, he was soon arrested and detained in the Tower of London as a spy. During his time in England, and probably while imprisoned, Ribault wrote an account of the voyage, which survives only in English translation.

The 1563 Peace of Amboise finally allowed Coligny to devote attention for a new voyage to North America. He appointed Ribault's former lieutenant, René Goulaine de Laudonnière, to replace Ribault in the North American endeavors. During this time, however, Charlesfort had fallen into despair. A fire destroyed most of the settlement's meager stores. Captain Albert de la Pierria's heavy discipline led the soldiers to a mutiny in which he was deposed and killed. Afterward, the survivors elected to build a crude vessel and attempt to sail back to France. The trip was arduous, and most of the participants died before they finally reached the English coast, where they were rescued. News of this reached France just before Laudonnière had embarked on his voyage.

=== Second voyage ===
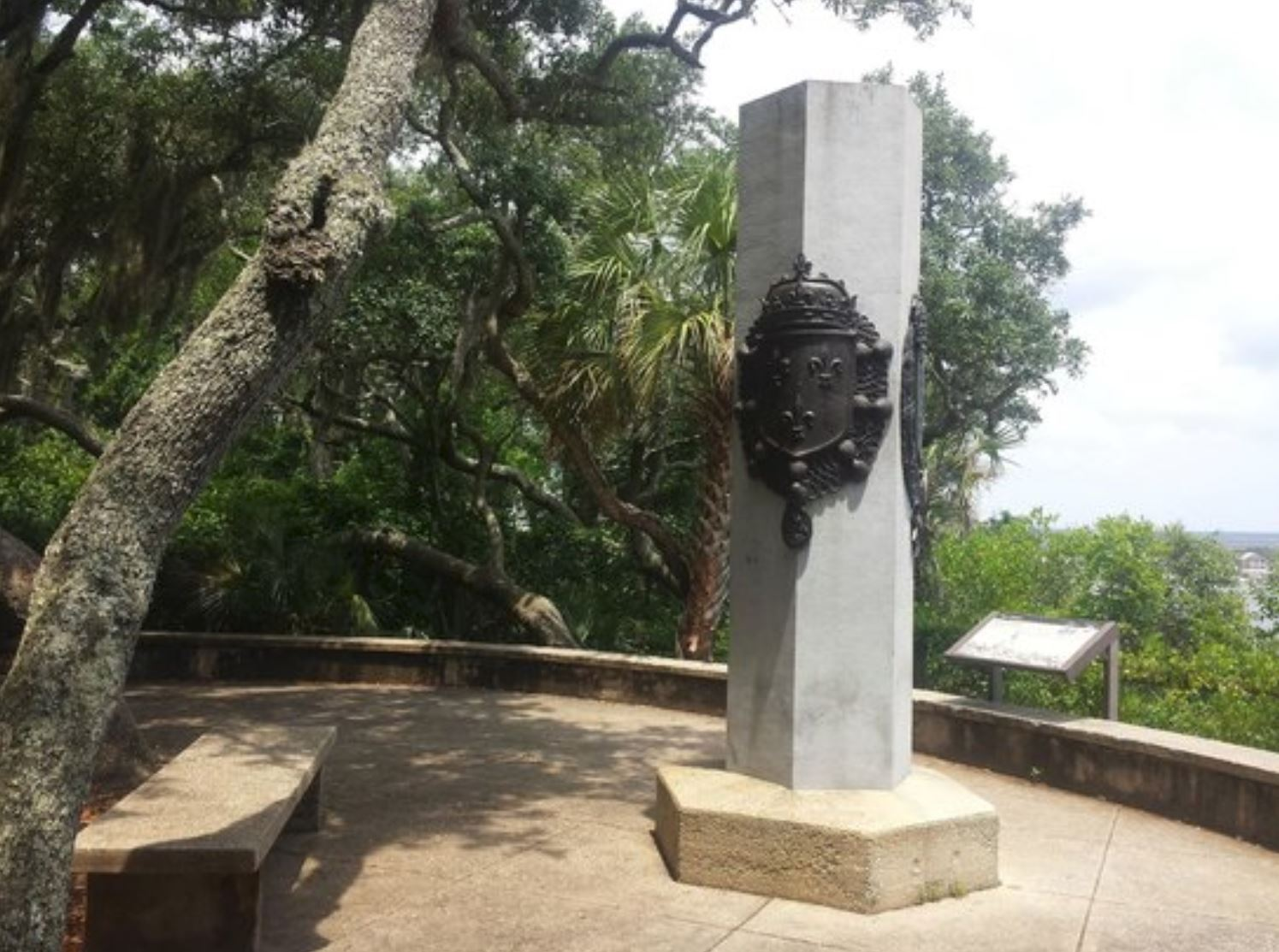
Jacksonville Jean Ribault Monument Column, St. Johns Bluff

Laudonnière ultimately set sail on April 22, 1564 and arrived at Florida two months later. The plan for Ribault was to follow him in Spring 1565 with reinforcements and fresh supplies. As Charlesfort was now abandoned, the expedition decided to found a new colony on the banks of the St. Johns River, the same area Ribault and company had explored on the prior voyage. They christened the settlement Fort Caroline.

Fort Caroline sustained itself for the next year, but Ribault found himself caught up in the fresh outbreak of war in France and was unable to set sail at the appointed time. As a result, the colony experienced food shortages and deteriorating conditions, and some soldiers mutinied and became pirates, attacking Spanish vessels in the Caribbean. The situation was exacerbated by a clash with the Utina, a Timucua Indian tribe up the river to the south. Ribault finally organized his fleet in the summer of 1565, ultimately departing from France with 800 new settlers and five ships. He arrived in Florida on August 28, just as the despairing Laudonnière was preparing to sail home. Ribault promptly relieved Laudonnière as governor and assumed command of Fort Caroline.

In the meantime, the Spanish, who had long maintained a claim over Florida, had made preparations to find and oust the French from Fort Caroline. In early September Pedro Menéndez de Avilés, newly-appointed adelantado of Florida, encountered Ribault's ships at anchor off the River of May. After a brief naval skirmish, the French ships cut their anchor lines and fled, and Menéndez retreated to the next inlet to the south, landing his men on 7 September and establishing the settlement of St. Augustine.

=== Disaster ===
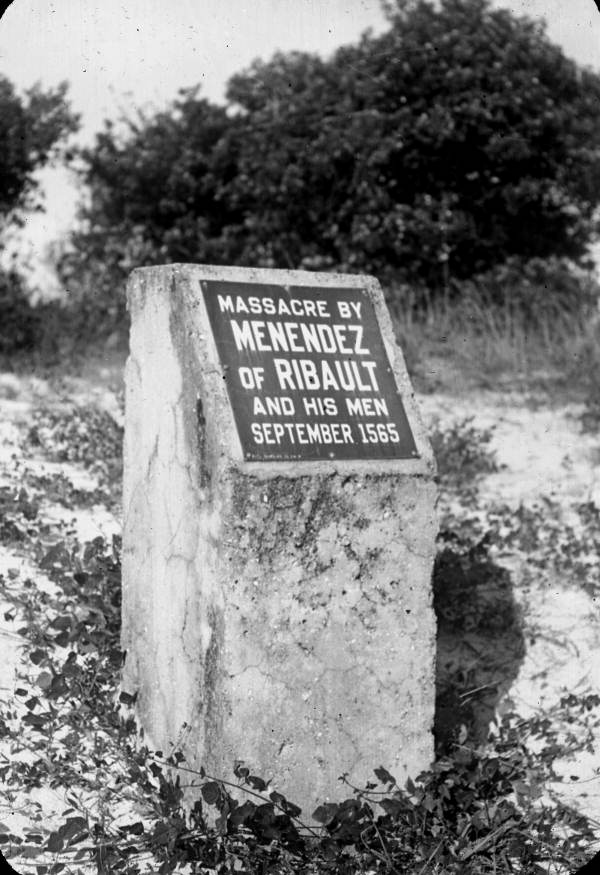
Marker at Fort Matanzas National Monument showing the location where Jean Ribault and his men were slaughtered by Pedro Menéndez de Avilés in September 1565

The Spanish hastily threw up palm-log and earthworks around an existing Timucua Indian village at their newly founded settlement and began unloading their ships. Before all of the equipment and supplies could be unloaded, Menéndez sent his flagship San Pelayo away to Hispaniola, as it was too big to enter the St. Augustine Inlet and Menéndez expected an attack from Ribault. Jean Ribault did attack only hours later, and almost captured Menéndez who was on a smaller vessel offshore, but the Spaniard risked crossing the sandbar at the mouth of the inlet and made it to the harbor. As the French galleons were also too large to cross the inlet, Ribault took his fleet south to pursue San Pelayo when the hurricane struck on September 11, driving his ships further south to their destruction on the Canaveral coast.

Assuming that the majority of the French men-at-arms were on board Ribault's ships, leaving Fort Caroline defenseless, Menéndez ordered his infantrymen to march 40 miles (64 km) north to Fort Caroline, during the hurricane. On 20 September, the Spanish captured the now-lightly-defended French settlement; 140 men were immediately put to death. In the eyes of the king of Spain, the Protestant religion and acts of piracy committed from Fort Caroline made the entire settlement a dangerous nest of pirates, heretics, and trespassers on Spanish territory. Only about 60 women and children were spared. René Laudonnière and about 40 others escaped the wrath of the Spaniards, and eventually returned to Europe to tell their tales.

The same hurricane that masked the approach of Menéndez's troops on Fort Caroline, utterly destroyed all of Ribault's fleet, driving them up on the beach many miles south of their intended target. Several hundred soldiers and sailors made it ashore barely alive and then walked from near present-day Daytona Beach to Matanzas Inlet, 14 miles south of St. Augustine. The marooned sailors were soon tracked down by Menéndez and a patrol force of Spanish troops, probably under a hundred men. Ribault, believing his hungry men would be fed and decently treated, allowed himself to be bluffed into surrender. In groups of ten, the Frenchmen were rowed across to the mainland, hands tied behind their backs. Following the explicit orders of King Philip II of Spain, the prisoners were asked if they were professing Catholics. Those who were not were marched behind a dune and put to the sword by Menéndez's Spanish soldiers. Only a handful of Catholics, young musicians, and ship's boys were spared their lives. A similar surrender and mass execution of a smaller group of Frenchmen followed a few days later. This time a few Frenchmen, suspicious of their enemies, preferred to take their chances with the Native Americans. Altogether, Ribault and about 350 of his officers and men lost their lives in the two massacres. The location of this event still carries today the name "Matanzas", the Spanish for "slaughters." Menéndez had carried out his orders to wipe out the French incursion.

In 1568 French nobleman-turned-pirate Dominique de Gourgues avenged Ribault. He and 200 men attacked Spanish-held Fort Caroline, secured the garrison's surrender, and then put all the defenders to death.

== Legacy ==
A replica of the stone column brought from France by Ribault (based on an engraving by Jacques Le Moyne De Morgues) was erected in 1924 by the Florida Chapters of the Daughters of the American Revolution to honor and memorialize the Huguenots who colonized Florida. It has been moved several times and is now in the Fort Caroline National Memorial. It appears on a postage stamp, Scott catalog number 616, printed in 1924 — one in a series of three celebrating the 300th anniversary of the arrival of the Huguenots and Walloons to North America.

In 2018 the shipwreck of Ribault's flagship, La Trinité, was located off of the coast of Cape Canaveral, Florida.

Several places and institutions in Jacksonville are named for Ribault, including Jean Ribault Middle School and Jean Ribault High School; the Ribault Club on Fort George Island; a tributary of the Trout River, the Ribault River; several neighborhood streets near the river; and the Mayport Ferry Service boat, the Jean Ribault. In Beaufort and adjacent Port Royal, SC, Ribaut (spelled without the l) Road is a major thoroughfare; as a segment of US 21 it passes near the Charlesfort site. Ribault was featured in the "Conquest of the Southeast" episode (2005) of The History Channel's documentary miniseries Conquest of America and in the "Secrets of Spanish Florida" episode (2017) of the PBS/WNET program, Secrets of the Dead.

== Gallery ==
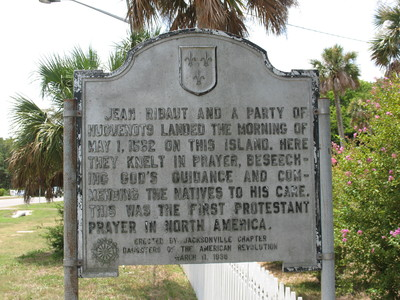
"Jean Ribault and a party of Huguenots landed the morning of May 1, 1562 on this island. Here they knelt in prayer, beseeching God's guidance and commending the natives to his care. This was the first Protestant prayer in North America."
