= Hernando de Manrique de Rojas =

Spanish colonial governor

- Occupation: Military commander

Hernando de Manrique de Rojas was a Spanish colonial governor of the Colony of Santiago (Jamaica) c.1575.

In late 1563 he commanded Spanish forces sent to destroy Charlesfort, a French fort at Port Royal, South Carolina. This fort had been abandoned after its leader Jean Ribault had returned to France to obtain supplies and had been delayed there by the outbreak of another phase of the French Wars of Religion. The Spanish, however, wanted to make it more difficult for the French to return.

Manrique de Rojas also explored the coasts of what is known today as the Eastern United States.

== See also ==
- Colony of Santiago (Jamaica)
- List of governors of Jamaica

== Sources ==
- Tebeau, Charlton W., A History of Florida. (Coral Cables, Florida: University of Miami Press, 1971) p. 29
- Woodbury Lowery. The Spanish Settlements within the Present Limits of the United States.
