= Conquest of America (miniseries) =

Documentary series

- Narrated by: Jeffrey Wright
- Country of origin: United States
- Original language: English

Original release
- Network: History Channel
- Release: March 28 – March 31, 2005

Conquest of America is a 4-part television documentary miniseries produced by History Channel and premiered on March 28, 2005. The show documents the adventures of various European explorers who were key figures in the colonization of the Americas. Some of the featured explorers include Henry Hudson, Pedro Menéndez, Jean Ribault, Vitus Bering and Francisco Vásquez de Coronado.

== Location ==
The show was mainly filmed in Jacksonville, Florida, with The Church of the Good Shepherd acting as many different buildings. This site was perfect because the coastal regions looked like the Caribbean, yet the inland regions looked like the areas that explorers of the American north explored.

== Episodes ==
The series is divided into four episodes. Each deals with how the major European powers tried to claim each geographic section of the Americas.

1. Southwest - Francisco Vásquez de Coronado testifies at his trial about the abuses perpetrated under his command during his search for the so-called Seven Cities of Gold.
2. Southeast - Jean Ribault hatches a daring scheme to wrest La Florida from the Spaniards, but this will only lead to tragedy.
3. Northeast - English explorer Henry Hudson and his doomed search for the Northwest Passage through America and into Asia.
4. Northwest - This episode is told in two halves. The first is about how Alaska was discovered by Vitus Bering. The second half is about how the Russian colony was saved when Nikolai Rezanov made a supply run to Spanish California.
