= Matanzas Inlet =

Ocean inlet in Florida, US

Coordinates: 29°42′21″N 81°13′42″W

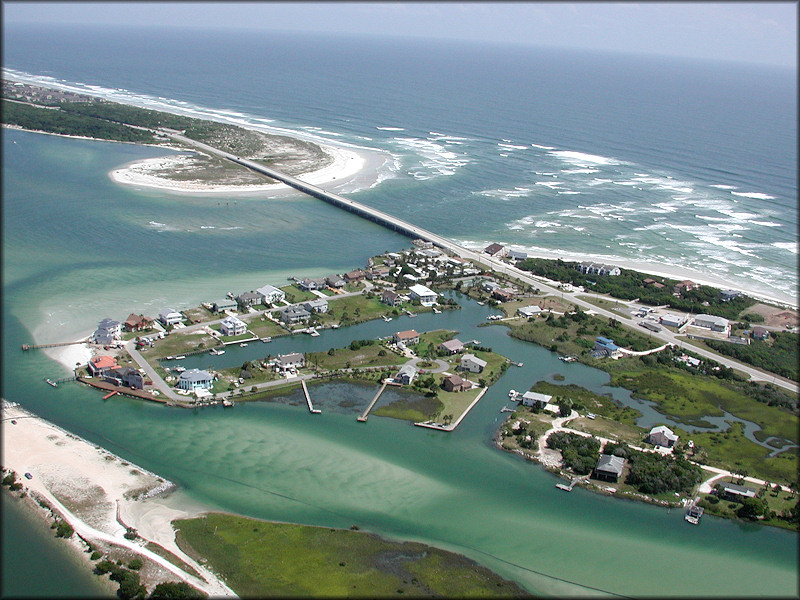
Aerial view of Matanzas Inlet, Florida, between Flagler Beach and St. Augustine

Matanzas Inlet is a channel in Florida between two barrier islands and the mainland, connecting the Atlantic Ocean and the south end of the Matanzas River. It is 14 miles (23 km) south of St. Augustine, in the southern part of St. Johns County. The inlet is not stabilized by jetties, and thus is subject to shifting. It is the last remaining natural or undredged inlet on the Atlantic coast of Florida.

Historic maps made by Spanish military engineers in the 18th century show that the inlet today has moved many hundreds of yards south of its location during the time of the Spanish Empire. In 1740, a British invasion force from Fort Frederica, Georgia blockaded this inlet, the southernmost access for boat travel between St. Augustine and Havana, Cuba. Shortly thereafter, in 1742, a coquina stone tower 50 feet (15 m) square by 30 feet (9.1 m) high, now called Fort Matanzas, was built by the Spanish authorities in Florida to safeguard this strategic inlet.

== Origin of name ==
René Goulaine de Laudonnière founded Fort Caroline in what is now Jacksonville, in 1564, as a haven for Huguenot settlers. In response to the French encroachment on what Spain regarded as its territory, Pedro Menéndez de Avilés founded St. Augustine in 1565. Menéndez de Avilés quickly set out to attack Fort Caroline, traveling overland from St. Augustine. At the same time, the French sailed from Fort Caroline, intending to attack St. Augustine from the sea. The Spanish overwhelmed the lightly defended Fort Caroline, sparing only the women and children, although some 25 men were able to escape. The French fleet was driven off course by a storm, and many of the ships wrecked on the coast south of St. Augustine. When the Spanish found the main group of the French shipwreck survivors, Menéndez de Avilés ordered all of the Huguenots executed. The location became known as Matanzas (Spanish for "slaughters").
