= Dominique de Gourgues =

French nobleman (1530–1593)

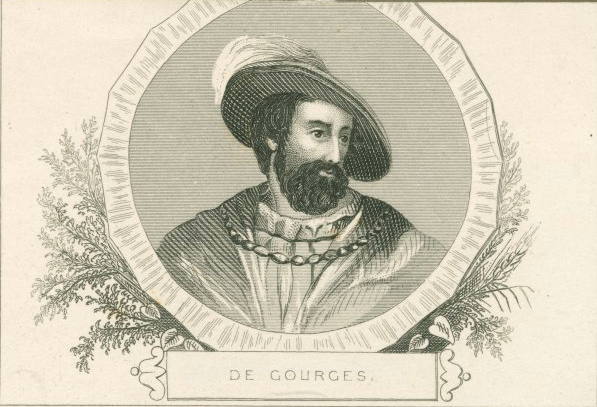
Dominique de Gourgues

Dominique (or Domingue) de Gourgues (1530–1593) was a French nobleman and soldier. He is best known for leading a privateer attack against Spanish Florida in 1568, in retaliation for the no quarter given after the capture of Fort Caroline and the subsequent Massacre at Matanzas Inlet. He was a captain in King Charles IX's army.

== Youth ==
De Gourgue's early life is not well known. He came from the old and powerful family of Gourgue, one of the most important families of the French city of Bordeaux. He served in the Italian wars under Maréchal de Strozzi, was captured by Spaniards in 1557, and then by the Turks, and served several years in the galleys. After his return to France, he made a voyage to Brazil and the West Indies, and then entered the service of Duke de Guise, and was employed against the Huguenots.

== Situation in the colonies ==
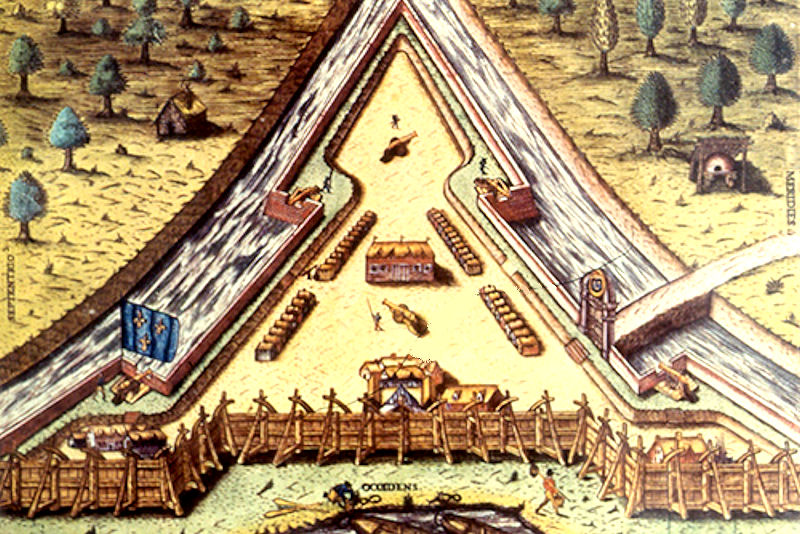
View of Fort Caroline

Philip II of Spain was a Roman Catholic king who hated Protestants, including the French Huguenots, and considered them heretics. He ordered his troops to kill any they found in the colonies. Therefore, in 1565, troops under Pedro Menéndez de Avilés notoriously massacred hundreds of Frenchmen around Fort Caroline in what is now Jacksonville, Florida. After capturing the fort and slaying nearly all his prisoners, Menéndez hung their bodies on trees, with the inscription, "Not as Frenchmen but as Lutherans." The massacre aroused indignation in France among Protestants and Catholics alike. The French king sent complaints to the Spanish court, but Menéndez and his associates, instead of being punished for the deed, received rewards and honors.

== Revenge ==
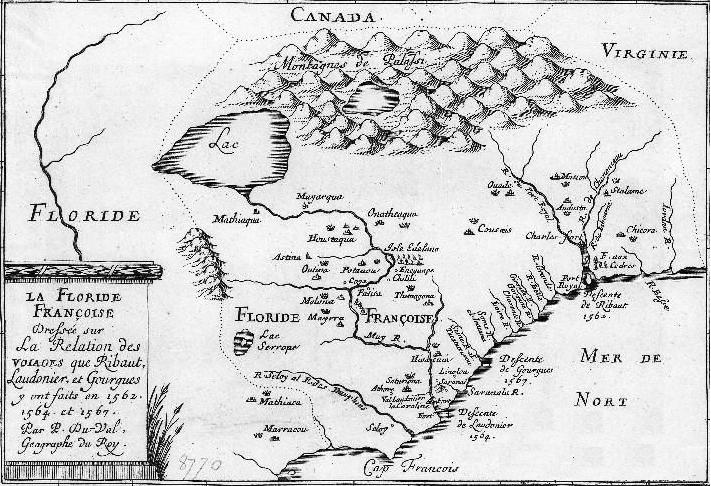
Floride française ("French Florida"), by Pierre du Val, 17th century.

Embittered by the cruelty and indignity that he had suffered from the Spaniards, de Gourgue determined to avenge the murder of his Protestant compatriots, though he was himself a Catholic. He sold everything he had and borrowed money from his brother Antoine to recruit a crew and charter three ships. He sailed to Cuba with two hundred men, never telling them the goal of their trip. Once in Cuba he made his intentions clear, and his crew approved his choice of revenge. Gourgue then moved to attack Spanish-held Fort Caroline, which they had renamed as Fort San Mateo, enlisting the aid of Fort Caroline's old allies, the Saturiwa and Tacatacuru clans of the Timucua Indians. The fort soon surrendered to de Gourgue's forces. The French and Indians killed the Spanish prisoners in retribution for Fort Caroline and other massacres of Protestants. They hanged the prisoners with the inscription, "Not as Spaniards but as murderers."

== Later life ==
De Gourgue returned to the port of La Rochelle on 6 June 1568. He was received cordially by Monluc, governor of Bordeaux, but coldly by the court, which feared a rupture with Spain. For several years he lived in obscurity, almost in misery, at Rouen with the president of Marigny, until restored to the king's favor in 1572. He was given command of a vessel, and participated in the Siege of La Rochelle, commanding the largest vessel of the squadron. In 1592 Don Antonio de Crato appointed him commander of the fleet for a campaign for the crown of Portugal against Philip II. While on the journey, de Gourgue died.

== Sources ==
=== English ===
- Wilson, J. G.; Fiske, J., eds. (1900). "Gourgues, Dominique Chevalier de" . Appletons' Cyclopædia of American Biography. New York: D. Appleton.
- Hannay, David (1911). "Avilés, Pedro Menéndez de" . In Chisholm, Hugh (ed.). Encyclopædia Britannica (11th ed.). Cambridge University Press.
- Morison, Samuel Eliot (1971). The European discovery of America: the northern voyages AD 500-1600. New York: Oxford University Press. OCLC 901940084.

=== French ===
- Extraits de l'histoire coloniale de la Floride et de la Louisiane
- Lhoumeau, Hélène. Les expéditions françaises en Floride (1562-1568)
- Document de la main de Gourgues
- Guérin, Léon. Les navigateurs français: Histoire des navigations, découvertes et colonisations françaises, 1847, p. 180
- Weiss, Charles. Histoire des réfigiés protestants de France, 1853.
