= Charlesfort-Santa Elena Site =

Archaeological site in South Carolina, United States

Coordinates: 32°18′23″N 80°40′32″W

- U.S. National Register of Historic Places
- U.S. National Historic Landmark
- Location within South Carolina Location within the United States
- Nearest city: Beaufort, South Carolina, U.S.
- Built: 1562
- NRHP reference No.: 74001822

Significant dates
- Added to NRHP: August 7, 1974
- Designated NHL: January 3, 2001

The Charlesfort-Santa Elena Site is an important early colonial archaeological site on Parris Island, South Carolina, United States. It contains the archaeological remains of a French settlement called Charlesfort, settled in 1562 and abandoned the following year, and the later 16th-century Spanish settlement known as Santa Elena. The Spanish remains include a fort built directly on top of the abandoned Charlesfort remains.

The fort and other nearby structures have been called, at various times, Fort San Marcos or Fort San Felipe, and have the designated archaeological site identifiers 38BU51 and 38BU162. Because of their remarkable state of preservation, and their importance in understanding early French and Spanish colonial practices, the site was designated a National Historic Landmark in 2001. The site is accessible through the United States Marine Corps Recruit Depot in Port Royal, South Carolina.

== Charlesfort (1562–1563, 1577-1578) ==
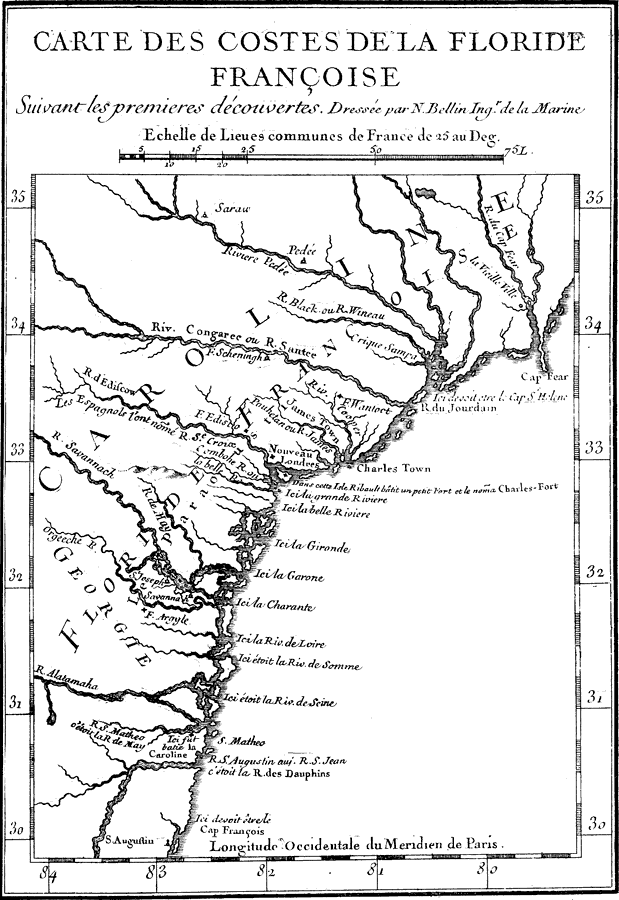
French Florida in 1562, by N. Bellin, 18th century

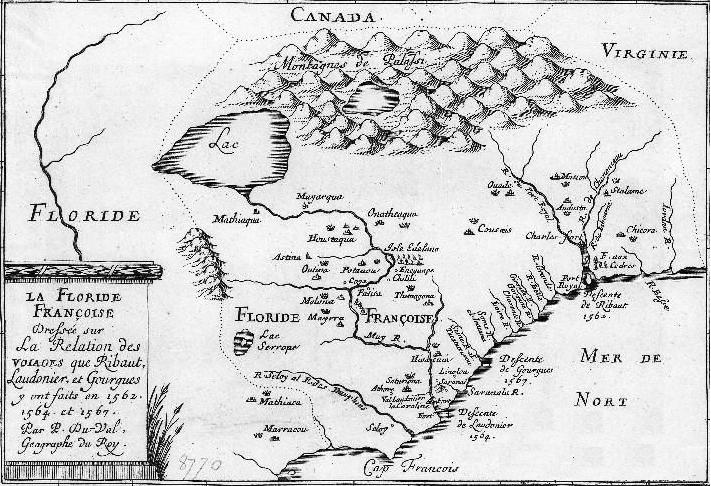
Floride françoise ("French Florida"), by Pierre du Val, 17th century

Charlesfort was established when a French expedition, organized by Huguenot leader Admiral Gaspard de Coligny and led by the Norman navigator Jean Ribault, landed at the site on the May River in May 1562, before moving north to Port Royal Sound. There, on present-day Parris Island, South Carolina, Ribault left twenty-eight men to build a settlement. He then returned to France to arrange supplies for the new colony but was arrested in England after becoming involved in the period of unrest known as the French Wars of Religion, which prevented his return.

After Ribault left, most of the settlers' stores were burned and Captain Albert de la Pierria died in a mutiny, possibly as a reaction to his heavy discipline. Without supplies or leadership, and beset by hostility from the native population, all but one of the remaining colonists sailed back to Europe after only a year. They built their own boat and set sail, without compass, across the Atlantic. During the long voyage in an open boat, they were reduced to cannibalism: one crew member named La Chère was killed and eaten. The survivors were finally rescued in English waters by an English ship, and some eventually reached France.

Shortly after the departure of the French, Hernando de Manrique de Rojas commanded a Spanish force from Cuba that destroyed Charlesfort and took captive the one Frenchman who had remained, along with the local Native Americans nearby. In January 1577, in a period when the Spanish settlement had been destroyed and not yet rebuilt, the French returned in the ship Le Prince. The expedition was commanded by Nicholas Strozzi, who may have been a brother of Filippo di Piero Strozzi. The ship was lost as she entered Port Royal Sound, and the men built a triangular fort, 130 feet on each side, enclosing five buildings. Many were killed by natives and the rest had been taken captive by the time Spanish returned in spring 1578. The Spanish obtained the captives from the natives between 1578 and 1580 and hanged almost all of them.

== Santa Elena (1566–1587) ==
Founded in 1566 on the site of Charlesfort, Santa Elena was the first capital of Spanish Florida. Fort San Salvador, a simple blockhouse, was built first, and then Fort San Felipe was built directly on top of the old French fort later in the year, with a new moat (the French one having been filled in). The fort was occupied until 1570, when it was destroyed by fire. The Spanish then built a second fort, also called Fort San Felipe, at an unknown nearby location. The fort and town were abandoned in 1576 due in part to hostility of the local natives.

In 1577 the Spanish returned and built Fort San Marcos. It was used until 1582 or 1583, when a second Fort San Marcos was constructed. This fortification had a moat dug around it in 1586, in anticipation of an attack by Sir Francis Drake. Santa Elena and the fortifications were finally abandoned in 1587. At its height, the town had about sixty dwellings, with an estimated population of 400-450.

== Archaeological history ==
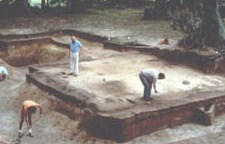
Fort Charles NE bastion

The area's archaeological importance was first identified in the mid-19th century by amateurs, who found what they believed to be Charlesfort and excavated large hinges such as would have been used on a large gate. In the summer of 1917 some of the earthworks associated with the first Fort San Felipe were leveled by United States Marine Corps personnel, filling in part of the moat. In the 1920s Major George Osterhout led an excavation of the site, which he concluded was that of Charlesfort. In response to this determination, a memorial marker was placed at the site.

Osterhout's interpretation was soon disputed, and by the 1950s archaeological consensus was that the site was part of Spanish Santa Elena. It was only after a series of excavations, running from the 1970s to the 1990s, that the full history and layout of the area was identified. Identification of the French fort location was made possible by the restricted location of distinctively French artifacts, and by the evidence that multiple moats had been dug around the site of the first Fort San Marcos.

The site is one of unparalleled importance in the early colonial history of North America and South Carolina, exemplifying the early competition for control of the region. Finds at the site also include the only known early Spanish pottery kiln on the continent. Since the area was never developed agriculturally, even surface-level remains continue to be found.

== See also ==
- Bibliography of South Carolina history
- French Florida
- Spanish Florida
- List of incidents of cannibalism
- List of National Historic Landmarks in South Carolina
- National Register of Historic Places listings in Beaufort County, South Carolina
- Roanoke Colony
