= Massacre at Matanzas Inlet =

1565 Spanish killing of French Huguenots in Florida

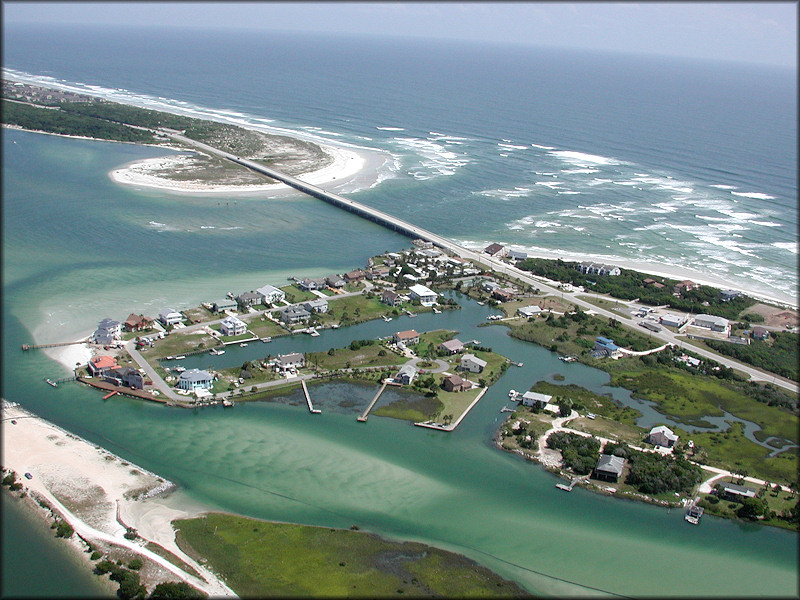
The massacre of the French Huguenots took place at Matanzas Inlet, which in the 16th century was located several hundred yards north of its present location.

The Massacre at Matanzas Inlet was the mass killing of French Huguenots by Spanish Royal Army troops near the Matanzas Inlet in 1565, under orders from King Philip II to Pedro Menéndez de Avilés, the adelantado of Spanish Florida (La Florida).

The Spanish Crown in the 16th century laid claim to a vast area that included what is now the state of Florida, along with much of what is now the southeastern United States, on the strength of several Spanish expeditions made in the first half of the 1500s, including those of Ponce de Leon and Hernando de Soto. However, Spanish attempts to establish a lasting presence in La Florida failed until September 1565, when Menéndez founded St. Augustine about 30 miles south of the newly established French Huguenot settlement at Fort Caroline on the St. Johns River. Menéndez knew that the French had already arrived in the area, being sent by Phillip II to expel them and establish a Spanish foothold in its place after reports of French privateers using the fort as a base of operations against the Spanish treasure fleets off of the Florida coast. Menendez also considered the French Huguenots as heretics in addition to being pirates, and invaders and moved aggressively against them. He marched with troops overland through swamps and dense forests and attacked the Huguenot settlement, sparing only women, children, Catholic males, and a few skilled craftsmen.

When the French Huguenot leader, Jean Ribault, learned of the Spanish presence nearby, he also decided on a swift assault and sailed south from Fort Caroline with most of his troops to search for the Spanish settlement. His ships were struck by a storm (probably a tropical storm) and most of the French force was lost at sea, leaving Ribault and several hundred survivors in two groups shipwrecked with limited food and supplies: one group about 15 miles south of the Spanish colony, and Ribault's group much farther southward at Cape Canaveral. Meanwhile, Menéndez marched north, overwhelmed the remaining defenders of Fort Caroline, massacred most of the French Protestants in the town, and left an occupying force in the rechristened fort, now called "San Mateo" by the Spanish. Upon returning to St. Augustine, he received news that Ribault and his troops were stranded to the south. Menéndez quickly moved to attack and massacred the French force of two separate parties on the shore of what became known as the Matanzas River.

== History ==
=== Wreck of Ribault's ships ===
On 28 September 1565, a group of local Timucua brought to St. Augustine information that a number of Frenchmen had been cast ashore on an island six leagues (about 25 kilometres or 16 miles) from St. Augustine, where they were trapped by the river (the Matanzas), which they could not cross. These proved to be the crews of two more ships of the French fleet which had left Fort Caroline on 10 September. Failing to find the Spaniards at sea, Captain Jean Ribault had not dared to land and attack St. Augustine, and so had resolved to return to Fort Caroline. When his vessels were caught in the same storm previously mentioned, the ships dispersed, and two of them wrecked along the shore between Matanzas Inlet and Mosquito Inlet. Part of the crews had been drowned in attempting to land, the Indians had captured fifty of them alive and had killed others, so that out of four hundred there remained only one hundred and forty. Following along the shore in the direction of Fort Caroline, the easiest and most natural course to pursue, the survivors had soon found their further advance barred by the inlet, and by the lagoon or "river" to the west of them.

=== Negotiations between first party of French survivors and the Spanish ===
On receipt of this news Menéndez sent Diego Flores in advance with forty soldiers to reconnoitre the French position; he himself with the chaplain, some officers, and twenty soldiers rejoined Flores at about midnight, and pushed forward to the side of the inlet opposite their encampment. The following morning, having concealed his men in the thicket, Menéndez dressed himself in a French costume with a cape over his shoulder, and, carrying a short lance in his hand, went out and showed himself on the river bank, accompanied by one of the French prisoners, in order to convince the castaways by his boldness that he was well supported. The Frenchmen soon observed him, and one of their number swam over to where he was standing. Throwing himself at his feet the Frenchman explained who they were and begged the Admiral to grant him and his comrades a safe conduct to Fort Caroline, as they were not at war with Spaniards.

"I answered him that we had taken their fort and killed all the people in it," wrote Menéndez to Philip II, "because they had built it there without Your Majesty's permission, and were disseminating the Lutheran religion in these, Your Majesty's provinces. And that I, as Captain-General of these provinces, was waging a war of fire and blood against all who came to settle these parts and plant in them their evil Lutheran sect; for I was come at Your Majesty's command to plant the Gospel in these parts to enlighten the natives in those things which the Holy Mother Church of Rome teaches and believes, for the salvation of their souls. For this reason I would not grant them a safe passage, but would sooner follow them by sea and land until I had taken their lives."

The Frenchman returned to his companions and related his interview. A party of five, consisting of four gentlemen and a captain, was next sent over to find what terms they could get from Menéndez, who received them as before, with his soldiers still in ambush, and himself attended by only ten persons. After he had convinced them of the capture of Fort Caroline by showing some of the spoil he had taken, and some prisoners he had spared, the spokesman of the company asked for a ship and sailors with which to return to France. Menéndez replied that he would willingly have given them one had they been Catholics, and had he any vessels left; but that his own ships had sailed with artillery for Fort San Mateo and with the captured women and children for Santo Domingo, and a third was retained to carry dispatches to Spain.

Neither would he yield to a request that their lives be spared until the arrival of a ship that could carry them back to their country. To all of their requests he replied with a demand to surrender their arms and place themselves at his mercy, so that he could do "as Our Lord may command me." The gentlemen carried back to their comrades the terms he had proposed, and two hours later Ribault's lieutenant returned and offered to surrender their arms and to give him five thousand ducats if he would spare their lives. Menéndez replied that the sum was large enough for a poor soldier such as he, but when generosity and mercy were to be shown they should be actuated by no such self-interest. Again the envoy returned to his companions, and in half an hour came their acceptance of the ambiguous conditions.

=== Massacre of the first French party ===
Both of Menéndez's biographers give a much more detailed account of the events, evidently taken from a common source. The Frenchmen first sent over in a boat their banners, their arquebuses and pistols, swords and targets, and some helmets and breast-pieces. Then twenty Spaniards crossed in the boat and brought the now unarmed Frenchmen over the lagoon in parties of ten. They were subjected to no ill treatment as they were ferried over, the Spaniards not wishing to arouse any suspicions among those who had not yet crossed. Menéndez himself withdrew some distance from the shore to the rear of a sand dune, where he was concealed from the view of the prisoners who were crossing in the boat.

In companies of ten the Frenchmen were conducted to him behind the sand dune and out of sight of their companions, and to each party he addressed the same request: "Gentlemen, I have but a few soldiers with me, and you are many, and it would be an easy matter for you to overpower us and avenge yourselves upon us for your people which we killed in the fort; for this reason it is necessary that you should march to my camp four leagues from here with your hands tied behind your backs." The Frenchmen consented, for they were now unarmed and could offer no further resistance, as their hands were bound behind them with cords of the arquebuses and with the matches of the soldiers, probably taken from the very arms they had surrendered.

Then Mendoza, the chaplain, asked Menéndez to spare the lives of those who should prove to be "Christians." Ten Roman Catholics were found, who, but for the intercession of the priest, would have been killed along with the Huguenots. These were sent by boat to St Augustine. The remainder confessed that they were Protestants. They were given something to eat and drink, and then ordered to set out on the march.

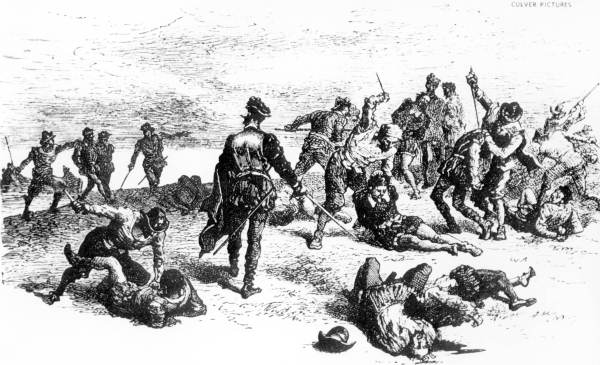
On 29 September 1565, the orders of Menéndez to kill the Huguenots were executed.

At the distance of a gunshot from the dune behind which these preparations were in progress, Menéndez had drawn a line in the sand with his spear, across the path they were to follow. Then he ordered the captain of the vanguard which escorted the prisoners that on reaching the place indicated by the line he was to cut off the heads of all of them; he also commanded the captain of the rearguard to do the same. It was Saturday, 29 September, the feast of St. Michael; the sun had already set when the Frenchmen reached the mark drawn in the sand near the banks of the lagoon, and the orders of the Spanish admiral were executed. That same night Menéndez returned to St. Augustine, which he reached at dawn.

On 10 October the news reached the garrison at St. Augustine that eight days after its capture Fort San Mateo had burned down, with the loss of all the provisions which were stored there. It was accidentally set on fire by the candle of a mixed-race servant of one of the captains. Menéndez promptly sent food from his own store to San Mateo.

=== Massacre of Ribault and the second French party ===
Within an hour of Menéndez receiving this alarming report some Indians brought word that Jean Ribault with two hundred men was in the neighborhood of the place where the two French ships had been wrecked. They were said to be suffering greatly, for Ribault's flagship La Trinité had broken to pieces farther down the shore, and their provisions had all been lost. They had been reduced to living on roots and grasses and to drinking the impure water collected in the holes and pools along their route. Like the first party, their only hope lay in a return to Fort Caroline. Le Challeux wrote that they had saved a small boat from the wreck; this they caulked with their shirts, and thirteen of the company had set out for Fort Caroline in search of assistance, and had not returned. As Ribault and his companions made their way northward in the direction of the fort, they eventually found themselves in the same predicament as the previous party, cut off by Matanzas Inlet and river from the mainland, and unable to cross.

On receipt of the news Menéndez repeated the tactics of his previous exploit, and sent a party of soldiers by land, following them that same day in two boats with additional troops, one hundred and fifty in all. He reached his destination on the shore of the Matanzas River at night, and the following morning, 11 October, discovered the French across the water where they had constructed a raft with which to attempt a crossing.

At the sight of the Spaniards, the French displayed their banners, sounded their fifes and drums, and offered them battle, but Menéndez took no notice of the demonstration. Commanding his own men, whom he had again disposed to produce an impression of numbers, to sit down and take breakfast, he turned to walk up and down the shore with two of his captains in full sight of the French. Then Ribault called a halt, sounded a trumpet call, and displayed a white flag, to which Menéndez replied in the same fashion. The Spaniards having refused to cross at the invitation of Ribault, a French sailor swam over to them, and returned immediately in an Indian canoe to his fellows, bringing the request that Ribault send over someone authorized to state what he wanted.

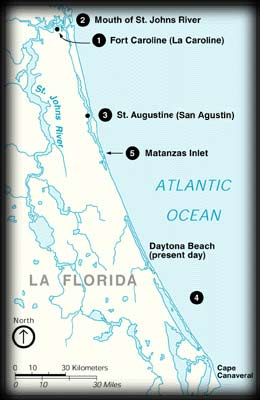
Map of the northeast coast of present-day Florida showing the locations of Fort Caroline and Matanzas Inlet

The sailor returned again with a French gentleman, who announced that he was Sergeant Major of Jean Ribault, Viceroy and Captain General of Florida for the King of France. His commander had been wrecked on the coast with three hundred and fifty of his people, and had sent to ask for boats with which to reach his fort, and to inquire if they were Spaniards, and who was their captain. "We are Spaniards," answered Menéndez. "I to whom you are speaking am the Captain, and my name is Pedro Menéndez. Tell your General that I have captured your fort, and killed your French there, as well as those who had escaped from the wreck of your fleet."

Then he offered Ribault the identical terms which he had extended to the first party and led the French officer to where, a few rods beyond, lay the dead bodies of the shipwrecked and defenseless men he had massacred twelve days before. When the Frenchman viewed the heaped-up corpses of his familiars and friends, he asked Menéndez to send a gentleman to Ribault to inform him of what had occurred; and he even requested Menéndez to go in person to treat about securities, as the Captain General was fatigued. Menéndez told him to tell Ribault that he gave his word that he could come in safety with five or six of his companions.

In the afternoon Ribault crossed over with eight gentlemen and was entertained by Menéndez. The French accepted some wine and preserves; but would not take more, knowing the fate of their companions. Then Ribault, pointing to the bodies of his comrades, which were visible from where he stood, said that they might have been tricked into the belief that Fort Caroline was taken, referring to a story he had heard from a barber who had survived the first massacre by feigning death when he was struck down, and had then escaped. But Ribault was soon convinced of his mistake, for he was allowed to converse privately with two Frenchmen captured at Fort Caroline. Then he turned to Menéndez and asked again for ships with which to return to France. The Spaniard was unyielding, and Ribault returned to his companions to acquaint them with the results of the interview.

Within three hours he was back again. Some of his people were willing to trust to the mercy of Menéndez, he said, but others were not, and he offered one hundred thousand ducats on the part of his companions to secure their lives; but Menéndez stood firm in his determination. As the evening was falling Ribault again withdrew across the lagoon, saying he would bring the final decision in the morning.

Between the alternatives of death by starvation or by the hands of the Spaniards, the night brought no better counsel to the castaways than that of trusting to the Spaniards' mercy. When morning came Ribault returned with six of his captains, and surrendered his own person and arms, the royal standard which he bore, and his seal of office. His captains did the same, and Ribault declared that about seventy of his people were willing to submit, among whom were many noblemen, gentlemen of high connections, and four Germans. The remainder of the company had withdrawn and had even attempted to kill their leader. Then the same actions were performed as on the previous occasion. Diego Flores de Valdes ferried the Frenchmen over in parties of ten, which were successively conducted behind the same sand hill, where their hands were tied behind them. The same excuse was made that they could not be trusted to march unbound to the camp. When the hands of all had been bound except those of Ribault, who was for a time left free, the ominous question was put: "Are you Catholics or Lutherans, and are there any who wish to confess?" Ribault answered that they were all of the new Protestant religion. Menéndez pardoned the drummers, fifers, trumpeters, and four others who said they were Catholics, some seventeen in all. Then he ordered that the remainder should be marched in the same order to the same line in the sand, where they were in turn massacred.

Menéndez had turned over Ribault to his brother-in-law, and biographer, Gonzalo Solís de Merás, and to Captain Juan de San Vicente, with directions to kill him. Ribault was wearing a felt hat and on Vicente's asking for it Ribault gave it to him. Then the Spaniard said: "You know how captains must obey their generals and execute their commands. We must bind your hands." When this had been done and the three had proceeded a little distance along the way, Vicente gave him a blow in the stomach with his dagger, and Merás thrust him through the breast with a pike which he carried, and then they cut off his head.

"I put Jean Ribault and all the rest of them to the knife," Menéndez wrote Philip four days later,"judging it to be necessary to the service of the Lord Our God, and of Your Majesty. And I think it a very great fortune that this man be dead; for the King of France could accomplish more with him and fifty thousand ducats, than with other men and five hundred thousand ducats; and he could do more in one year, than another in ten; for he was the most experienced sailor and corsair known, very skillful in this navigation of the Indies and of the Florida Coast."

== Repercussions of the massacre ==
That same night Menéndez returned to St. Augustine; and when the event became known, there were some in that isolated garrison, living in constant apprehension of a counterattack by the French, who considered him cruel, an opinion which his brother-in-law, Merás, who helped to kill Ribault, did not hesitate to record. And when the news eventually reached Spain, even there a vague rumor was afloat that there were those who condemned Menéndez for perpetrating the massacre against his given word. Others among the settlers thought that he had acted as a good captain, because, with their small store of provisions, they considered that there would have been an imminent danger of their perishing by hunger had their numbers been increased by the Frenchmen, even had they been Catholics.

Bartolomé Barrientos, Professor at the University of Salamanca, whose history was completed two years after the event, expressed still another current of Spanish contemporary opinion:

He acted as an excellent inquisitor; for when asked if they were Catholics or Lutherans, they dared to proclaim themselves publicly as Lutherans, without fear of God or shame before men; and thus he gave them that death which their insolence deserved. And even in that he was very merciful in granting them a noble and honourable death, by cutting off their heads, when he could legally have burnt them alive.

The motives which impelled Menéndez to commit these deeds of blood should not be attributed exclusively to religious fanaticism, or to racial hatred. The position subsequently taken by the Spanish Government in its relations with France to justify the massacre turned on the large number of the French and the fewness of the Spaniards; the scarcity of provisions, and the absence of ships with which to transport them as prisoners. These reasons do not appear in the brief accounts contained in Menéndez's letter of 15 October 1565, but some of them are explicitly stated by Barrientos. It is probable that Menéndez clearly perceived the risk he would run in granting the Frenchmen their lives and in retaining so large a body of prisoners in the midst of his colonists: it would be a severe strain upon his supply of provisions and seriously hamper the dividing up of his troops into small garrisons for the forts which he contemplated erecting at different points along the coast.

The massacre was the latest in an escalating cycle of both revenge killings and total war tactics between French and Spanish forces in both Europe and the New World. These atrocities were rooted in more than the recent Spanish military support for the Catholic League during the French Wars of Religion. The French were offended by the Spanish and Portuguese being granted a monopoly over New World colonization at the Treaty of Tordesillas in 1494. This had resulted ever since in increasingly violent acts of piracy against the Spanish treasure fleets and settlements in both the Canary Islands and throughout the New World by Catholic and Huguenot French corsairs based at La Rochelle. Ribault's colony at Fort Caroline was, according to historian Angus Konstam, "clearly designed to provide a base for Huguenot attacks against Spanish ports and shipping."

Even Admiral Gaspard de Coligny, who had bankrolled the founding of Fort Caroline, admitted that the colony, "had no tillers of the soil, only adventurous gentlemen, reckless soldiers, discontented tradesmen, all keen for novelty and heated by dreams of wealth." Also according to Angus Konstam, the primary legacy of the massacre at Matanzas Inlet was that, "Organized French resistance to Spain in the New World was broken, and it was left to the English sea rovers to disrupt the commerce of the Spanish Main."

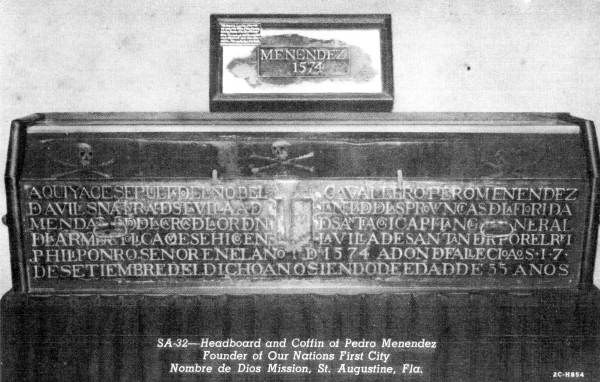
Headboard and coffin of Pedro Menéndez de Avilés at Mission of Nombre de Dios in St. Augustine, Florida

King Philip II accordingly wrote on the back of a dispatch sent by Menéndez from Havana, of 12 October 1565: "As to those he has killed he has done well, and as to those he has saved, they shall be sent to the galleys." In his official utterances in defense of the massacre, however, King Philip II laid far more stress on the theological contamination which Calvinism might have brought to the Indigenous population of La Florida than upon the repeated invasions and pirate attacks against his subjects and dominions.

On his return to St. Augustine, Menéndez wrote to the King a somewhat cursory account of the preceding events and summarized the results in the following language:

The other people with Ribault, some seventy or eighty in all, took to the forest, refusing to surrender unless I grant them their lives. These and twenty others who escaped from the fort, and fifty who were captured by the Indians, from the ships which were wrecked, in all one hundred and fifty persons, rather less than more, are [all] the French alive to-day in Florida, dispersed and flying through the forest, and captive with the Indians. And since they are Lutherans and in order that so evil a sect shall not remain alive in these parts, I will conduct myself in such wise, and will so incite my friends, the Indians, on their part, that in five or six weeks very few if any will remain alive. And of a thousand French with an armada of twelve sail who had landed when I reached these provinces, only two vessels have escaped, and those very miserable ones, with some forty or fifty persons in them.

Ever since 12 October 1565, when Jean Ribault and the larger part of the French Huguenots who had survived the wreck of Ribault's fleet were massacred by Menéndez, the inlet where the deed occurred has been known as Matanzas, meaning "slaughters" in Spanish.

Fort Matanzas, the Matanzas River, and the Matanzas Inlet all derive their name from the massacre.

== See also ==
- French Florida
- Spanish Florida
