= Missions in Spanish Florida =

Catholic religious outposts

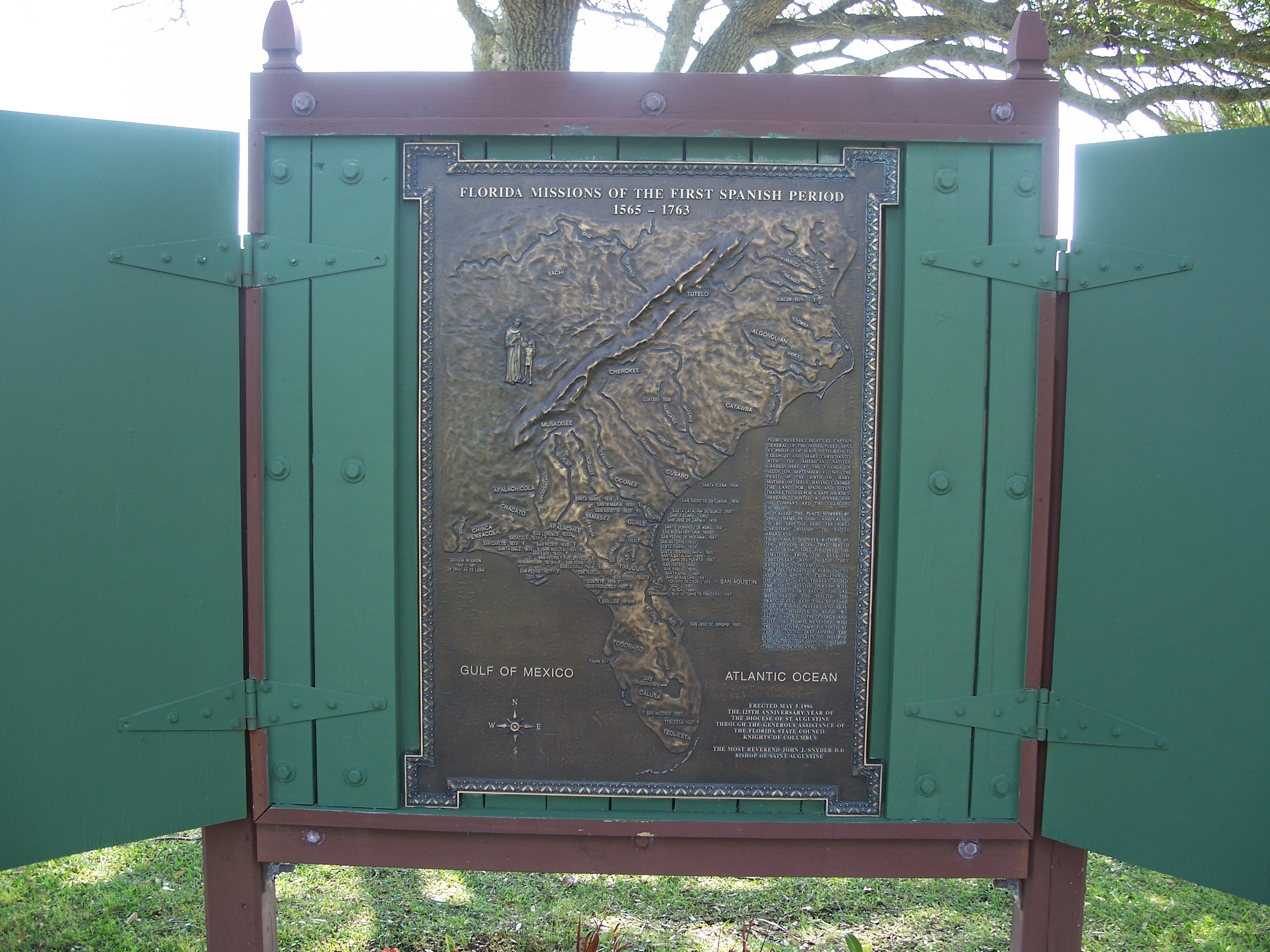
A plaque showing the locations of a third of the missions between 1565 and 1763

Beginning in the second half of the 16th century, the Kingdom of Spain established missions in Spanish Florida (La Florida) in order to convert the indigenous tribes to Roman Catholicism, to facilitate control of the area, and to obstruct regional colonization by Protestants, particularly, those from England and France. Spanish Florida originally included much of what is now the Southeastern United States, although Spain never exercised long-term effective control over more than the northern part of what is now the State of Florida from present-day St. Augustine to the area around Tallahassee, southeastern Georgia, and some coastal settlements, such as Pensacola, Florida. A few short-lived missions were established in other locations, including Mission Santa Elena in present-day South Carolina, around the Florida peninsula, and in the interior of Georgia and Alabama.

The missions of what are now northern Florida and southeastern Georgia were divided into four main provinces where the bulk of missionary effort took place. These were Apalachee, comprising the eastern part of what is now the Florida Panhandle; Timucua, ranging from the St. Johns River west to the Suwanee; Mocama, the coastal areas east of the St. Johns running north to the Altamaha River; and Guale, north of the Altamaha River along the coast to the present-day Georgia Sea Islands. These provinces roughly corresponded to the areas where those dialects were spoken among the varying Native American peoples, thus, they reflected the territories of the peoples. Missionary provinces were relatively fluid and evolved over the years according to demographic and political trends, and at various times smaller provinces were established, abandoned, or merged with larger ones. There were also ephemeral attempts to establish missions elsewhere, particularly further south into Florida.

== History ==
Although priests and religious (monks) had traveled with the early conquistadors, the 1549 expedition of Father Luis de Cancer and three other Dominicans to Tampa Bay was the first solely missionary effort attempted in La Florida. It ended in failure with de Cancer being clubbed to death by the Tocobaga natives soon after landing, which diminished Catholic interest in La Florida for sixteen years.

The first Spanish missions to La Florida, starting with the foundation of St. Augustine in 1565, were attached to presidios, or fortified bases. Between 1559 and 1567, seven presidios were established at major harbors from Port Royal Sound in modern South Carolina to Tampa Bay on the eastern Gulf of Mexico in an attempt to prevent other European powers from establishing bases on land claimed by Spain. Most of the presidios were unsustainable; San Mateo (near modern-day Jacksonville, Florida) was destroyed by the French, the entire garrison at Tocobago was wiped out, and most of the other presidios were abandoned due to a combination of hostility from the native inhabitants, difficulty in providing supplies, and damage from hurricanes.

By 1573, the only remaining presidios in La Florida were at St. Augustine and Santa Elena on Paris Island, South Carolina. Santa Elena was abandoned in 1587, leaving St. Augustine as the only sizeable Spanish settlement in La Florida. The mission system functioned for decades, as the Spanish convinced most village leaders to provide food and labor in exchange for tools and protection. Regular waves of European-borne disease along with conflict with Carolina colonists to the north weakened the system as the 1600s progressed. It collapsed in the aftermath of Queen Anne's War, when colonists from the Province of Carolina, along with their Creek allies, killed or kidnapped much of the remaining native population of Spanish Florida except in areas near St. Augustine and Pensacola. The network of missions was virtually destroyed by Carolina Governor James Moore's incursions into northern Florida between 1702 and 1709, a series of attacks that were later called the Apalachee massacre. Dozens of missions and surrounding villages were abandoned by the early 1700s and their locations lost, as was much of the former route of El Camino Real. As a result, only a few mission sites in Florida have been found and positively identified.

== Jesuit missionaries ==
After French Huguenots under René Goulaine de Laudonnière established Fort Caroline on the St. Johns River in 1564, Phillip II, King of Spain, commissioned Pedro Menéndez de Avilés to drive the French out of Spanish Florida and to provide missionaries to the native inhabitants. In 1565, de Avilés founded St. Augustine and defeated the French. He quickly established a number of strong points, or presidios along the coast from Santa Elena in South Carolina down the length of the Florida peninsula and up the Gulf coast of Florida to Tampa Bay. Two of the presidios were in what is now the state of Georgia, on Guale (St. Catherines) Island (abandoned after three months) and at the Tacatacuru chiefdom on Cumberland (San Pedro) Island (abandoned in 1573). De Avilés had only four priests in his initial company, and three of those ministered to the garrisons at St. Augustine, Santa Elena, and San Mateo (on the site of the captured Fort Caroline). De Avilés asked the Society of Jesus to send missionaries to convert the natives. In the meantime, he appointed particularly pious lay persons at each presidio to instruct the natives on Christianity. De Aviles sent a secular priest to the town of Guale in 1566 to preach to the natives, but that priest was soon recalled and sent to Santa Elena. All of the presidios, except for St. Augustine and Santa Elena, were abandoned within four years. The first Jesuit missionaries arrived in Florida in 1566, soon followed by others. Jesuits started missions at the towns of Guale (on St. Catherines Island) and Tupiqui. Jesuit missionaries to the Guale complained that it was difficult to convert the natives to Christianity because they did not remain resident in one place, but moved to be near food resources as they became seasonally available. A Jesuit missionary, Father Pedro Martinez, and three companions attempted to establish a mission at Tacatacuru that year, but all four were killed by the Tacatacuru. Discouraged by the killings at Tacatacuru and a lack of progress in converting the Guale, the Jesuits withdrew from the Georgia coast and, in 1570, established the Ajacán Mission in what is now the state of Virginia. All of those missionaries were killed a few months later. The surviving Jesuit missionaries were withdrawn from Spanish Florida in 1572. There are indications that a Franciscan friar was resident in Tupiqui on the Sapelo River in 1569–1570, and that in the 1570s Theatine friars established a mission in the town of Guale, but little has been found about those missions in Spanish records.

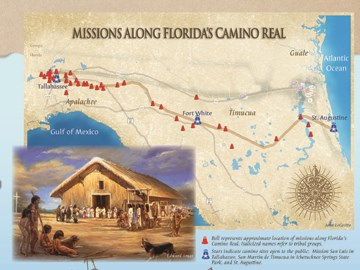
Modern map showing the approximate location of Spanish missions and the connecting Camino Real across northern Florida

The missions at the presidios were staffed by the Jesuits. Due to the hostility of the Native Americans, which resulted in the killing of several of the missionaries, the Jesuits withdrew from the mission field in La Florida in 1572. Franciscan friars entered into La Florida in 1573, but at first confined their activities to the immediate vicinity of St. Augustine. The Franciscans began taking their mission to the Guale and Timucua along the Atlantic coast in 1587. Starting in 1606 the Franciscans expanded their mission efforts westward across northern Florida along a primitive but lengthy road known as El Camino Real. The road and the network of missions stretched across the Florida panhandle through the territory of the Timucua and reached the Apalachees in the vicinity of modern Tallahassee by 1633.

== Franciscan missionaries ==
Before de Avilés left Florida for the final time in 1572, he requested missionaries be sent by the Franciscans. The first Franciscan friars arrived at Santa Elena in 1573, and over the next few years a few Franciscans served in Spanish Florida, primarily in the garrison towns of St. Augustine and Santa Elena. Four Franciscan priests arrived in Florida in 1584, and another twelve arrived in Spanish Florida in 1587, one year after the presidio and town at Santa Elena had been abandoned. The Franciscan missionaries were assigned to native towns, primarily near St. Augustine, but including a mission on Cumberland Island, San Pedro de Mocama, established in 1587. Few of those Fransciscans remained in Spanish Florida for very long, with only five left in 1592. More Franciscans arrived in 1595, and six more missions were established that year along the Georgia coast, including at Puturiba near the northern end of Cumberland Island (in Mocama Province), and five in Guale Province, at Tupiqui on the Sapelo River, Asao at the mouth of the Altamaha River, Talapo (or Ospo) on the mainland near Sapelo Island, Tolomato on the mainland near St. Catherines Island, and on Guale (St. Catherines) Island. Another mission was established in Ibi (Yui) Province the following year. In 1597, the Spanish visited Tama, their name for the area west of Guale Province. Gonzalo Méndez de Canço, governor of Florida, proposed establishing a mission in Tama, but was refused permission to do so because the area was considered to be too far from St. Augustine.

Nuestra Señora de Guadalupe de Tolomato was in a Guale town on the mainland north of Asao and Talaxe. The Franciscan friar Pedro Corpa arrived in Spanish Florida in 1587, and may have been resident at Tolomato beginning in that year. Corpa was the resident missionary at Tolomato in 1597 when the Guale Uprising started, and was the first of the missionaries killed by the rebels. Some of the residents of Tolomato may have settled in Espogache by the time a mission was established there.

Tupiqui was a Guale town three leagues north of Tolomato on the mainland. Jesuit missionaries had tried to establish a mission there in 1569–1570, but left in the general withdrawal from Guale. The mission of Santa Clara was established there in 1595. The Franciscan friar Blas Rodríguez was killed in the Guale Uprising, and the mission was destroyed. Tupiqui may have been rebuilt after 1603, and Tupiqui and Espogache may have been merged. The mission in Tupiqui did not have a resident priest in 1606, and was served by the missionary at Talaxe. Espogache had a church in 1606, but not a priest. Espogache is not mentioned in Spanish records after 1606. A missionary was resident at the Santa Clara mission in 1616, but the mission does not appear in Spanish records after that year. In 1677 some of the former residents of Tupiqui were living at Zapala, while many had joined other Guale and Yamassee who moved to English-held territory.

Ospo or Talapo/Tulapo was a Guale town in the northern part of Guale province. The Franciscan missionary in Ospo in 1697 was Francisco Dávila. He was the only missionary in Guale to survive the uprising, but was held captive and abused for ten months. Ospo and Talapo are not mentioned in Spanish records after 1606. A cacique named Antonio Hospo, living among Guale people on Amelia Island in 1695, may have been a survivor of the residents of Ospo.

== Guale uprising ==
In 1597, the missions in Guale Province suffered a disaster known as the Guale Uprising or Juanillo's Revolt. Juanillo was a Guale in Tolomato, who had been converted to Christianity, but refused to give up his multiple wives. When Fray Pedro de Corpa, the friar at the mission, tried to force Juanillo to be monogamous, Juanillo, along with two other Guale men who resented the missionary's attempts to suppress polygamy, killed him. Other villages joined the rebellion, and four other missionaries were also killed. The missionary at Talapo (Ospo), escaped death, but was enslaved and physically abused for ten months before being rescued. A Guale war party tried to attack the Mocama missions on Cumberland Island, but the presence of a Spanish ship anchored near the island may have discouraged most of the Guale, who turned back. Only a small party of Guale men entered the mission village. They were discovered before they could kill anyone and were driven off. The mission effort on the Georgia coast was greatly reduced. The friar at Puturiba was sent to Spain to report on the killing of the friars. The missions in Guale Province had been destroyed in the revolt, and missionaries did not return to Guale Province for several years. The friar at Tacatacuru, and at least some of the Christianized Mocama on Cumberland Island, including their chief, were evacuated to St. Augustine after the Guale Uprising, but had returned to the island in about six months. The mission at Ibi was also abandoned, but Ibi people visited towns near San Pedro. Guale attacked Cumberland Island again later that year (1598), burning some villages and killing three people.

== Return to Guale ==
While some of the friars left Florida after the Guale Uprising, others expressed confidence in the progress of missions in other provinces. The mission of San Pedro on Cumberland Island served seven towns on the island, with 384 baptized converts, and many others were receiving instruction in the faith. The Franciscans also reported that there were 1,200 converts in Guale Province who could be won back if the province could be brought under Spanish control again. Peace was restored in Guale in 1603, and new missions had been established as San José de Zapala on Sapelo Island, San Buenaventura de Guadalquini on St. Simons Island, and Santa Catalina de Guale on St. Catherines Island by the end of that year. In 1606, Juan de las Cabezas Altamirano, bishop of the Diocese of Santiago de Cuba (whose see was in Havana), visited Florida and confirmed 1,652 native converts in Guale Province.

Some sources state there was a mission on St. Catherines Island in 1587, although Hann notes that a report from 1588 stated that there were no missions on the Georgia coast north of San Pedro de Mocama on Cumberland Island. A mission was established at the village of Asopo on the island in 1595, but abandoned two years later when both of the resident friars were killed in the Guale Uprising. Asopo was not the chief town of the island, and its location is not known. When Franciscan missionaries returned to St. Catherines Island, a church was built at the chief's town in 1604, but Fray Pedro de Ibarra did not take up residence there until the next year. The mission was an important source of food for St. Augustine until it was abandoned. The Spanish and Guale successfully repelled an attack on the mission by English and Yamassee forces in 1680, but the mission was then abandoned, and many of the mission residents moved south. A site on Wamassee Creek in the middle part of the west side of the island has been identified as the location of the mission.

The Guale towns of Asao (or Asaho) and Talaxe were on the mainland near the mouth of the Altamaha River in the later part of the 16th century. A Franciscan mission was established in Asao in 1595, and abandoned in 1597 after the resident friar was killed in the Guale Uprising. A new mission, San Domingo, was established in Asaho by 1604. Asao and Talaxe apparently merged at some point, as the mission was later referred to alternately as San Domingo de Asao and San Domingo de Talaxe (or Talaje). Bishop Altamitano confirmed 268 Guale converts at the mission in 1606. A Spanish report indicates that the British Fort King George was built on the former site of Talaxe. Sometime before 1675, the mission was moved to St. Simons Island, with about 30 inhabitants, where it was still known as San Domingo de Asaho or Asajo. In the 1680s, as the mission system in Georgia collapsed, some of the town's residents joined the Yamassee at the "Scotch colony at Santa Elena", while others moved to Amelia Island, where a town was briefly called Asao or Tupique.

A mission called San Pedro de Atulteca was established by 1616 in the Guale town of Tuluteca, which was (presumably) on the mainland four leagues north of the mission of Santa Catalina de Guale on St. Catherines Island. The mission also appears on a list in 1647, but in 1655 had changed to San Felipe. Sometime before 1675, the mission had moved to Cumberland Island, which no longer had any Mocama residents. It retained the same name, and was called Señor San Felipe Althuluteca in 1680. Further troubles caused the mission to move again in the 1680s to the southern end of Amelia Island in the present-day state of Florida.

The mission of San Felipe de Alabe was reported in 1616, located north of Tupique. It was one of the most northern of Guale missions in Georgia. A mission of San Felipe was present in 1655. Hann states that there may have been a fusion between San Felipe de Alabe and San Pedro de Atulteca that resulted in the mission of San Felipe de Athulutheca.

A mission of San Diego de Satuache, first noted in 1616, may have been the northernmost mission in Guale province. Lanning placed Satuache near the mouth of the Edisto River, in South Carolina. Worth places Satuache near the mouth of the Ogeechee River. In 1662 Chicimeco attacked the town of Huyache, which was about five leagues north of Satuache and did not have a mission. The residents of Satuache then moved south to Santa Catalina de Guale on St. Catherines Island. They remained part of the Santa Catalina community through two more moves southwards.

The mission of Santa Isabel de Utinahica was located at the junction of the Ocmulgee and Oconee rivers.

A people called "Chisca" by the Spanish, who Hann believes later become known as Yuchis, attacked western Timucua and Apalachee missions around 1650. In 1651 Governor Vallecilla sent a Spanish soldier to Guale to determine if Chiscas were threatening that province. At least one patrol by Spanish soldiers and Guale warriors fought Chiscas and chased them away from Guale.

People that the Spanish called "Chichimeco", likely the Westo, threatened the Guale missions in 1661. There may have been a confrontation between Spanish soldiers and the Chichimeco, resulting in the capture of some Chichimeco.

== Retreat ==
The establishment of an English colony at Charles Town in 1670 resulted in severe disruption to the missions in Spanish Florida. The English traded firearms and other manufactured goods to the Westo, Muscogee and Yamassee peoples in exchange for slaves, deerskins, and furs, who in turn began attacking the missions of Spanish Florida. In 1680, a Muscogee war party attacked the mission of Santiago de Ocone on Jekyll Island, but was repelled. A party of 300 warriors led by English officers attacked the mission town of Santa Catalina on St. Catherines Island, but six Spanish soldiers and 16 Guale musketeers successfully defended the mission. Following the attacks, the governor of Spanish Florida ordered a withdrawal from the northern part of Guale Province, including the native residents of the mission towns. The Guale did not want to leave, and many fled into the woods, some even joining the raiding Muscogee and Yamassee. By 1684 most of the northern Guale had gone over to the English side. At the same time, pirates began raiding the remaining Spanish missions along the Georgia coast. The Spanish were unable to protect the missions from the English, their native allies, and the pirates. By 1686, all of the Spanish missions north of the St. Marys River had been abandoned.

The people of Santa Isabel de Utinahica were moved to St. Simons Island in the middle of the 17th century. The declining Oconi population was bolstered by moving other Timucua people from southern Georgia to the mission. The mission of Santa María de los Angeles de Arapaje was listed in the 1630s in the Arapaha chiefdom. Some time between 1630 and 1655 the Oconi and Ibihica missions were merged. The Spanish later ordered the combined Ibi and Oconi to move to the coast. When they refused, the Spanish destroyed the town. Timucua people living around the Alapaha, Oconee and Ocmulgee rivers may have been moved south to missions along the mission road in northern Florida that connected St. Augustine and Apalachee Province.

San Pedro de Mocama last appeared in Spanish records in 1655. Guales and Yamassees moving south along the coast may have pushed the Timucuan Mocamas to move south soon after that date, perhaps to Amelia Island.

Yamassee people were forced out of Tama Province by raids conducted by Westo, and settled in or near mission towns.

San Pedro do Mocama mission appeared on Spanish lists until 1659. The mission of San Phelipe (or Felipe) de Athulteca was established by 1675. The original inhabitants of Cumberland Island had probably been evacuated by then, and the island reinhabited by heathens. Mission San Pedro de Potohiriba (possibly an alternate form of Puturibe) was established in western Timucua Province by 1657, probably serving Yamassee. In 1605 there were 300 Christians in San Pedro Province (partly in Florida), with 308 being confirmed in 1606 by Bishop Altamirano. The Guale mission of Nuestra Señora Guadalupe de Tolomato was moved to near St. Augustine in 1658. The Salamototo mission was moved to the site of an old Saturiwa town in 1658. No mention of Guale in Spanish records after 1735.

Just 70 Mocamas were reported as living at two missions in 1675, San Buenaventura de Guadalquini and San Juan del Puerto on the St. Johns River in present-day Florida.

== Late mission period ==
Late in the mission period Spanish missionary activity briefly entered what is now southwestern Georgia. The town of Sabacola, or Sabacola el Menor, located just below where the Chattahoochee and Flint rivers join to form the Apalachicola River, was the site of a mission called La Encarnation a la Santa Cruz, or just Santa Cruz, from 1674 to 1677. Fearing attack from the Chisca in western Florida, with whom the Apalachee were fighting, the inhabitants of Sabacola moved north, probably in 1677. A new town of Sabacola el Grande was founded on the Chattahooche River a few leagues south of the falls at present-day Columbus, which was in the territory of the Lower Towns of the Muscogee Confederacy. Some residents of Sabacola had become Christians when the town was located in Florida, and requested that missionaries be sent to them. Spanish missionaries attempted to establish a mission in Sabacola in 1697. The Christians of Sabacola had not informed the chief of Coveta, one of the four "mother towns" of the Muscogee Confederacy, of the request. On hearing of the arrival of the missionaries, the chief traveled to Sabacola and forced the missionaries to leave three days later. Juan Márquez Cabrera, who had become governor of Spanish Florida in 1680, sent missionaries back to Sabacola in 1681, with an escort of seven Spanish soldiers. The missionaries baptized 36 residents of Sabacola before being forced out again a few months later. Cabrera suspected English influence in the hostility shown the missionaries. Threats from Cabrera led to at least the Christianized residents of the town moving south to a point west of the Flint River just above where it joins the Chattahoochee. A mission named San Carlos de Sabacola was established in the town before 1686. The mission last appears in Spanish records in 1690. The mission town may have included Chatots from the earlier mission of San Carlos de los Chacatos in present-day Jackson County, Florida.

San Felipe was a mission on Cumberland Island listed in 1676. It was probably located on the former site of San Pedro de Mocama. Hann suggests that the inhabitants of the mission were Christianized Guale and pagan Yamassee, with the former Mocaman residents having moved south to what is now Florida.

- San Buenaventura de Guadalquini, St. Simons Island, Timucua
- Santo Domingo de Asaho, St. Simons Island, Guale

Native peoples to the north of Guale Province, armed and encouraged by the English in the Province of Carolina, attacked the missions at Guadalquini and Santa Catalina in 1680. Another attack on missions in Georgia occurred in 1684. As a result, all of the Spanish missions in Gulae were withdrawn, and by 1685 there were no missions remaining north of the St. Marys River. Residents of the mission towns, as well as unconverted Yamassees, who often established towns near the missions, were scattered. Some were resettled in missions closer to St. Augustine, some retreated into the woods, some were captured and sold as slaves in Charleston, and some joined the native allies of the English.

The attacks on the missions in 1680 were carried out by about 300 Chichimeco, Uchise, and Chiluque (Note: Hann identifies the Chiluque of the 1680s as likely Yamassee.) warriors, aided by English instructors (likely helping with the provision and maintenance of firearms). The force initially attacked the town of Colon on St. Simons Island, which was inhabited by heathen (un-Christianized) natives, killing some of the inhabitants. Spanish and Mocamas from the nearby mission of San Buenaventura de Guadalquini went the aid of Colon, and drove the attackers away. The same group attacked the mission of Santa Catalina de Guale on St. Catherines Island a few days later.

Pirates attacked St. Augustine in 1683. After that attack failed, the pirates sacked several missions and other towns along the coast north of St. Augustine, mainly in present-day Florida, but including the mission of San Phelipe on Cumberland Island. The Spanish government began planning to move the remaining missions along the Georgia coast closer to St. Augustine. Before the missions could be moved, pirates returned to the area in 1684. Learning of the pirates' presence, most of the people of Guadalquini moved to the mainland, taking most of their food stores with them, and left ten men under a sub-chief to defend the town. When the pirates arrived at Guadalquini, the defending force retreated to the woods. The pirates burned the church and convent (priest's house) and left. The mission was then moved to a site on the north side of the St. Johns River (in present-day Florida), which was named Santa Cruz de Guadalquini.

== Mission activity ==
Missions in Spanish Florida were initially organized around the existing native political groupings. Typically, five to ten towns or villages would be associated in a chiefdom, with one of the towns serving as the seat of the chief. Two or more of the chiefdoms might be allied, sometimes with one of the chiefs acting as a leader over other chiefdoms. Mission stations of two types were established by Spanish missionaries. Doctrinas were stations with a resident missionary, usually in the chief town of a chiefdom. A doctrina typically included a church, a residence for the missionary, and a kitchen. Visitas were stations with a cross and some sort of rudimentary chapel, often open-air, in outlying villages, which were visited by a missionary, but had no resident missionary. Churches at doctrinas typically had wood posts supporting a roof of thatch over a clay floor. Plank and wattle and daub walls often enclosed at least part of the church. (Note: Herbert Eugene Bolton, John Tate Lanning, and other historians believed, from the mid-19th century into the early 20th century, that tabby ruins in coastal Georgia and northeastern Florida were the remains of Spanish missions, even though local residents had earlier identified the ruins as those of 18th century sugar mills and cotton barns. The fact that the ruins were built after the establishment of the Georgia Colony by Great Britain was not fully accepted by historians until late in the 20th century.) While missionaries conducted some services at visitas, converted residents of visita villages would go to the doctrina on important feast days. In 1620, 32 doctrinas in Spanish Florida served more than 200 towns and villages. Native populations declined throughout the mission period in Spanish Florida. By the 1630s, all of the surviving residents of outlying villages in Mocama Province had been relocated to the principal town of a chiefdom, and the visitas were abandoned. Spanish soldiers were sometimes stationed at missions to protect them from pirates and from English and French raids. The missionaries reported that the soldiers interfered with their work by acting inappropriately with the natives. Converted natives received a Christian name at baptism, and adopted at least some Christian customs. Many also learned Spanish.

== Provinces ==
The Spanish used the term "province" for the territory of a tribe or chiefdom. There was no fixed definition of province boundaries. As tribes and chiefdoms lost population and importance, the provinces associated with them would no longer appear in the records. Other provinces expanded to take in their territories. Most of the people taken into the mission system were Timucua speakers. Three major groups that spoke other languages were also taken into the mission system. The Guale Province was the territory the Guale, and covered what is now coastal Georgia and the Sea Islands north of the Altamaha River. The Guale were among the first people to be taken into the mission system, in the 1580s.

Later in the 17th century, Guale Province was sometimes referred to as extending southward and including the region otherwise known as Mocama. The Apalachee Province included the Apalachee people, who spoke a Muskogean language, and were brought into the mission system in the 1630s. It occupied the easternmost part of what is now the Florida Panhandle, along the Gulf of Mexico coast from the Aucilla River to the Ochlockonee River. The Spanish established one early mission among the Mayaca people, a non-Timucuan speaking tribe south of the Agua Fresca, and resumed efforts among them, and their relatives, the Jororo, in the late 17th century. This district, which became known as the Mayaca-Jororo Province, occupied an area to the south of Lake George, on the upper (southern) St. Johns River.

The Timucua-speakers, most of whom were brought into the mission system in the late 16th and early 17th centuries, were initially seen by the Spanish as living in a dozen or so provinces, with the Acuera, Ibi, Mocama, Potano, Timucua (in its restricted sense, north of the Santa Fe River, and east of the Suwannee River), Utina, Yufera, and Yustaga provinces becoming major components of the mission system. During the 17th century, as Timucuan populations declined and the locations of Spanish missions were consolidated along the road between St. Augustine and Apalachee, most of these provinces were gradually consolidated in Spanish usage into a Timucua Province stretching from the Atlantic Ocean to the Aucilla River.

The Mocama Province included the coastal areas of southeastern Georgia and northern Florida from St. Simons Island south to St. Augustine, extending westward to approximately the distance of the St. Johns River in Florida. It included some of the earliest missions to be established, and served the Mocama, a Timucuan-speaking group of the coastal areas. Important missions established in the Mocama Province were San Juan del Puerto, among the Saturiwa chiefdom, and San Pedro de Mocama, among the Tacatacuru.

The Timucua Province was initially established to serve the people known to the Spanish as the Timucua (called the Northern Utina by modern scholars), who spoke the "Timucua proper" dialect. Eventually, however, it absorbed several other Timucua-speaking provinces and became the largest of all the Florida mission districts. Following shortly after the success of the Mocama missions, the Spanish established missions among the Agua Fresca (Eastern Utina or Freshwater Timucua) along the middle St. Johns River, from roughly present-day Palatka south to Lake George. Similarly, the missions among the Potano, centered on what is now Gainesville, were considered part of the Potano Province, while missions to the Acuera, who lived around the Ocklawaha River, were part of the Acuera Province. Most of these areas were eventually considered part of the larger Timucua Province, in some cases because native populations had declined to the point that they could no longer support multiple missions. (The missions in Acuera Province were abandoned after the Timucua rebellion of 1656, although non-Christian Acueras continued to live there for another 40 years.) At this stage the Timucua Province included the area between the St. Johns and Suwanee rivers. Later, the Yustaga Province, which served the Yustaga who lived to the west of the Suwanee as far as the Aucilla River, was added, and the Timucua province covered the majority of north central Florida. The coastal area south of the Mocama Province and St. Augustine was known as La Costa; though this area had some Timucua speakers, it did not see much missionary activity, perhaps because it was less densely populated. There were also a few missions established to the north and west of the Apalachee Province.

== Timucuan missions ==
In 1602, San Pedro de Mocama was reported to have 300 resident Christians, while 792 were reported to attend mass there on major feast days. A number of visitas were recorded as attached to San Pedro early in the 17th century, on San Pedro (Cumberland) Island and elsewhere. Puturiba, where a mission had been established in 1595, was listed as a visita with a church building under San Pedro. Olatayco and Alatico were reported as visitas under San Pedro in 1604, with a church located at Olatayco. The two places appear to have been adjacent to each other, or the names may have been variant names for the same place. Hann suggests that "Olacayco" was based on "Holato" (chief) "Yco". Hann quotes Deagan as saying Olacayco/Alatico were "probably Cascange towns". By 1603 the church at San Pedro was old enough that the governor proposed building a new church. Bishop Altamirano visited the mission at San Pedro in 1606, confirming natives on both visits. San Pedro was named as a mission with a resident friar in 1655. There is some evidence that the San Pedro mission was moved south into what is now Florida sometime between 1650 and 1675. and that the mission San Felipe de Athuluteca was later established on its old site. A site at the south end of Cumberland Island, just north of the Dungeness wharf, has been identified as the probable site of Tacatacuru, the town in which San Pedro was situated, but the site of the mission appears to have eroded away.

San Buenaventura de Guadalquini was a mission on St. Simon's Island. Guadalquini was first mentioned in Spanish records in 1606, while the mission of San Buenaventura was first mentioned in 1609. While some authors have placed San Buenaventura de Guadalquini on Jekyll Island, and considered its residents to be Guale, Hann notes that no Spanish records identified them as Guale, and records from the middle of the 17th century clearly show them to have been Mocama. Guadalquini was near the southern end of St. Simon's Island, with the rest of the island occupied by Guale people. Ashley, et al. suggest that all of St. Simon's Island was originally occupied by Guale, but that Mocama had displaced them from the southern end of the island after the Guale Uprising.

In 1602, a couple of missionaries visited five villages with a total of 700 to 800 inhabitants in Ibi Province, but the first mention of an established mission in the province, San Lorenzo de Ibihica (hica was Timucuan for "village", so Ibihica meant "village of Ibi"), was in 1630. Hann believes that the mission was established in 1612 or soon thereafter, as additional Franciscan missionaries entered La Florida that year. There is no mention of a mission in Ibi after 1630 (the next list of missions after 1630 was in 1655).

Also in 1602, a missionary visited Cascangue (also called Ycafui), which had about 1,100 people in seven or eight villages. Another missionary visited the Ocone, who were described as living on an island in a laguna, which may mean a lake, pond, or lagoon. Hann concludes that they lived on the eastern edge of the Okefenokee Swamp. While some of the people in those provinces were interested in learning about Christianity, and sometimes visited friends in towns that did have missions, there were no missionaries available at the time to take up residence in those provinces. The Cascangue/Ycafui do not appear in Spanish records after 1602.

A missionary apparently was assigned to the Ocone by 1645, although there is no name given for the mission. That year, Governor Benito Ruíz de Salazar Vallecilla ordered that the Ocone be relocated to San Diego de Laca, on the St. Johns River. That village was responsible for providing ferry services across the river as part of the trail connecting St. Augustine with Apalachee Province. There is no record of any of the Ocone being moved to San Diego de Laca, however. The mission Santiago de Ocone appears only on a 1655 list of missions visited by an official. That year, Governor Diego de Rebolledo ordered the people of Ocone and neighboring villages to move to the mission of Nombre de Dios near St. Augustine, which had lost most of its population. When the chief of Ocone asked for a delay until their crops had been harvested, the governor sent soldiers to seize the chief, burn the villages, and force the people to move to St. Augustine. However, most of the people fled to the woods, while a few may have taken refuge at the San Pedro mission. Ocone disappeared from Spanish records after this.

Known records are sparse for Mocama Province between 1609 and 1655. The Mocamas may have been hard hit by epidemics that struck Spanish Florida in 1614 through 1617. There is one report of Spanish soldiers being sent into Mocama Province in 1622 or 1623 to round up Christian natives who had fled the missions to live in the woods (called Indios Cimarrones), and return them to the missions. Later in the 1620s, a Spanish expedition found that all canoes had been removed from crossing places normally used for travel in the province.

In the middle of the 17th century the mission towns of San Pedro de Mocama and San Buenaventura de Guadalquini were responsible for providing transportation by canoe, if needed, and food to Spanish officials and soldiers travelling along the coast between St. Augustine and Guale Province.

The mission at San Pedro de Mocama last appeared in Spanish records in 1655. A smallpox epidemic in Spanish Florida that year may have largely eliminated the population of the mission, with any survivors relocated closer to St. Augustine. By 1675 it was reported that only Yemassee lived on St. Catherines Island, while the inhabitants of Nombre de Dios mission near St. Augustuine were described as being Mocama.

In 1674, the bishop of Santiago de Cuba, the diocese that included Spanish Florida, visited the missions in Florida, including four along the Georgia coast; San Felipe on Cumberland Island, Santa Buenaventura de Guadalquini on Jekyll Island, Santo Domingo de Asahó on St. Simons Island, San José de Zapala on Sapelo Island, and Santa Catalina on St.Catherines Island.

"San Pedro became Santa Clara de Tupiqui in the 1690s."

The mission of Santa María de Los Angeles de Arapaha had been established by 1630 on the Alapaha River. After the Timucuan Rebellion of 1656, Governor Robelledo order the people of Arapaha be moved to the mission Santa Fé de Potano along the trail connecting Sy. Augustine to Apalachee Province. The mission of Santa Fé had lost most of its population, and its chief had been executed following the Timucua Rebellion. Most of the people transferred to Santa Fé from Arapaha soon fled to the woods, as the population of Santa Fé was depleted again by 1659, but the mission at Arapaha disappeared from Spanish records.

Santa Cruz de Cachipile (ca. 1625 - ca. 1657) was a Spanish mission serving the Utinan. It was located seventy leagues (around 242 miles) from St. Augustine. The mission is said to be located near the Georgia Welcome Center, and was at least there from 1655 to 1657.

In 1567, Governor Diego de Rebolledo visited three Spanish Florida provinces and multiple missions. Rebolledo stated that Cachipile was a satellite of the mission San Ildefonso de Chamile. Santa Cruz de Cachipile was never mentioned after this visit.

In 1990, John H. Hann (historian author) mentioned the mission in his "Summary Guide to Spanish Florida Missions and Visitas With Churches in the Sixteenth and Seventeenth Centuries". However, not much was thought about the mission other than its presumed site and approximate year of creation, likely because of a limited number of historical documents about the mission or excavations to the site.

From 1998 to 2001, volunteers and archaeological field school students from Valdosta State University excavated a large, contact period Native American village near Lake Park, Georgia, 13 miles (21 km) southeast of Valdosta, Georgia, believed to be the location of Mission Santa Cruz de Cachipile. A one-day remote sensing project was conducted in July, 2004. The excavation was initiated when Marvin Smith, Professor of Anthropology at Valdosta State University, observed Spanish artifacts at the site. One of the artifacts was an olive jar. Sherds of the jar were found in the bed of a lake when it drained into a sinkhole. Work at the site eventually led to the discovery of mission period artifacts in a plowed field behind a house. The owner of the house allowed access to her property for further archaeological investigations.

== Architecture ==
The mission buildings of La Florida were built with posts set into the ground. The walls were palmetto thatch, wattle and daub or plank, or left open. The floors were clay, and scholars believe the roofs were thatched. The church buildings in the missions averaged some 20 m by 11 m. Other buildings situated within a palisade included a convento to house the missionaries, a barracks for the soldiers, and often a separate kitchen.

== See also ==
- List of missions in Spanish Florida
- Spanish missions in Georgia
- History of Florida

== Sources ==
- Ashley, Keith H. (2013). "Grafting Onto the Native Landscape: The Franciscan Mission System in Northeast Florida". In Johnson, Timothy J.; Melville, Gert (eds.). From La Florida to La California: Franciscan Evangelization in the Spanish Borderlands. Academy of American Franciscan History. pp. 143–164. ISBN 978-0-88382-068-1.
- Bolton, Herbert Eugene (1964). Bannon, John Francis (ed.). Bolton and the Spanish Borderlands. University of Oklahoma Press. p. 138. ISBN 0-8061-0612-3.
- Burnett, Gene (1986). Florida's Past, Volume 1. Sarasota, Florida: Pineapple Press. ISBN 1-56164-115-4.
- Cassanello, Robert; Stapleton, Kevin (November 18, 2013). "Episode 07 Spanish Mission Bell". UCF Stars.
- Childers, Ronald Wayne (2004). "The Presidio System in Spanish Florida 1565-1763". Historical Archaeology. 38 (3): 24–32. doi:10.1007/BF03376651. JSTOR 25617178. S2CID 160809833.
- Deagan, Kathleen A. (1978). "Cultures in Transition: Fusion and Assimilation among the Eastern Timucua". In Milanich, Jerald; Proctor, Samuel (eds.). Tacachale: Essays on the Indians of Florida and Southeastern Georgia during the Historic Period. Gainesville, Florida: The University Presses of Florida. pp. 89–119. ISBN 0-8130-0535-3.
- Ethridge, Robbie (2023). "The American South to 1600". In Brundage, W. Fitzhugh; Edwards, Laura F.; Sensbach, Jon F. (eds.). A New History of the American South. UNC Press Books. p. 36. ISBN 978-1-4696-7019-5.
- Floyd, Joseph (Winter 2013). "Ghosts of Guale: Sugar Houses, Spanish Missions, and the Struggle for Georgia's Colonial Heritage". The Georgia Historical Quarterly. 97 (4): 387–410. JSTOR 24636327.
- Francis, J. Michael; Kole, Kathleen M. (2011). "Introduction: Spanish Florida on the Eve of Uprising". In Francis, J. Michael; Kole, Kathleen M. (eds.). Murder and Martyrdom in Spanish Florida: Don Juan and the Guale Uprising of 1597 (PDF). Anthropological Papers of the American Museum of Natural History. Vol. 95. pp. 17–38.
- Gannon, Michael V. (1983) [1965]. The Cross in the Sand (2nd ed.). Gainesville, Florida: University Presses of Florida. ISBN 978-0-8130-0776-2.
- Griffin, John W. (1993). "Foreword". In McEwan, Bonnie G. (ed.). The Spanish Missions of "La Florida". Gainesville, Florida: University Press of Florida. pp. xv–xvii. ISBN 0-8130-1232-5.
- Hann, John H. (July 1987). "Twilight of the Mocama and Guale Aborigines as Portrayed in the 1695 Spanish Visitation". The Florida Historical Quarterly. 66 (1): 1–24.
- Hann, John H. (April 1990). "Summary Guide to Spanish Florida Missions and Visitas. With Churches in the Sixteenth and Seventeenth Centuries". The Americas. 46 (4): 470–471. doi:10.2307/1006866. JSTOR 1006866. S2CID 147329347.
- Hann, John H. (1993). "The Mayaca and Jororo and Missions to Them". In McEwan, Bonnie G. (ed.). The Spanish Missions of "La Florida". Gainesville, Florida: University Press of Florida. ISBN 0-8130-1232-5.
- Hann, John H. (1996a). A History of the Timucua Indians and Missions. Gainesville, Florida: University Presses of Florida. ISBN 978-0-8130-1424-1.
- Hann, John H. (1996b). "The Missions of Spanish Florida". In Gannon, Michael (ed.). The New History of Florida. Gainesville, Florida: University Presses of Florida. ISBN 0-8130-1415-8.
- Hann, John H. (2006). The Native American World Beyond Apalachee. University Press of Florida. ISBN 9-780-8130-2982-5.
- Larson, Lewis H. Jr. (1978). "Historic Guale Indians of the Georgia Coast and the Impact of the Spanish Mission Effort". In Milanich, Jerald; Proctor, Samuel (eds.). Tacachale: Essays on the Indians of Florida and Southeastern Georgia during the Historic Period. Gainesville, Florida: The University Presses of Florida. pp. 120–140. ISBN 0-8130-0535-3.
- McEwan, Bonnie G. (1993). "Preface". In McEwan, Bonnie G. (ed.). The Spanish Missions of "La Florida". Gainesville, Florida: University Press of Florida. pp. xix–xxi. ISBN 0-8130-1232-5.
- Milanich, Jerald T. (January 1972). "Tacatacuru and the San Pedro de Mocamo Mission". The Florida Historical Quarterly. 50 (3): 283–291. JSTOR 30145847.
- Milanich, Jerald T. (1995). Florida Indians and the Invasion from Europe. Gainesville, Florida: University Press of Florida. p. 82. ISBN 0-8130-1360-7.
- Milanich, Jerald T. (1996). Timucua. Blackwell. ISBN 978-1-55786-488-8.
- Milanich, Jerald (1999a). Laboring in the fields of the Lord: Spanish missions and Southeastern Indians. Washington: Smithsonian Institution Press. ISBN 1560989408.
- Milanich, Jerald (1999b). The Timucua. Wiley-Blackwell. ISBN 0-631-21864-5.
- Milanich, Jerald T. (2002). ""A Very Great Harvest of Souls": Timucua Indians and the Impact of European Colonization". In Merrill, William L.; Goddard, Ives (eds.). Anthropology, History, and American Indians: Essays in Honor of William Curtis Sturtevant. Smithsonian Contributions to Anthropology. Washington, D.C.: Smithsonian Institution Press. pp. 113–120.
- Mormino, Gary R. (2014). "Introduction. Ponce's Ghosts: Spain and Florida, 1513–2013". In Balsera, Viviana Díaz; May, Rachel A. (eds.). La Florida: Five Hundred Years of Hispanic Presence. University Press of Florida. ISBN 978-0-8130-5505-3.
- Saccente, Julie Rogers; White, Nancy Marie (2015). "Fort San José, a Remote Spanish Outpost in Northwest Florida, 1700–1721". In Funari, Pedro Paulo A.; Senatore, Maria Ximena (eds.). Archaeology of Culture Contact and Colonialism in Spanish and Portuguese America. Cham: Springer International Publishing. pp. 297–311. doi:10.1007/978-3-319-08069-7_16. ISBN 978-3-319-08069-7.
- Saunders, Rebecca (1993). "Architecture of the Missions Santa María and Santa Catalina de Amelia". In McEwan, Bonnie G. (ed.). The Spanish Missions of "La Florida". Gainesville, Florida: University Press of Florida. ISBN 0-8130-1232-5.
- Thomas, David Hurst (1993). "The Archeology of Mission Santa Catalina de Guale: Our First 15 Years". In McEwan, Bonnie G. (ed.). The Spanish Missions of "La Florida". Gainesville, Florida: University Press of Florida. pp. 1–34. ISBN 0-8130-1232-5.
- Worth, John E. (1998). Timucua Chiefdoms of Spanish Florida. Volume 2: Resistance and Destruction. University Press of Florida. ISBN 0-8130-1575-8.
- Worth, John E. (2007). The Struggle for the Georgia Coast. The University of Alabama Press. ISBN 978-0-8173-5411-4.
- "John Worth Faculty Homepage - PCF Project - Mission San Joseph de Escambe". pages.uwf.edu.
- Worth, John E. "Persacola Colonial Frontiers Project". Faculty Homepage: Dr. John E. Worth.
- UWF Staff (2015). "Luna Expedition". UWF Anthropology and Archeology. University of West Florida. Archived from the original on 19 December 2015.
- UWF Staff (2016). "Selected Chronology of European Colonization in the Southeastern U.S." University of West Florida. Archived from the original on 26 October 2016.
