= San Buenaventura de Guadalquini =

Spanish mission in Georgia, US, moved to Florida

San Buenaventura de Guadalquini or San Buenaventura de Boadalquivi was a Spanish mission located on St. Simon's Island, Georgia, United States from between 1597 and 1609 until 1684, when pirates burned the mission and its town. The mission moved to the north side of the St. Johns River near its mouth, in present day Duval County, Florida under the name of Santa Cruz de Guadalquini or Santa Cruz y San Buenaventura de Guadalquini for a few years before merging with the mission San Juan del Puerto.

== Location and ethnicity ==
Guadalquini was the Timucua language name for St. Simon's Island, which the Spanish called Isla de Ballenas (Isle of Whales). The name also appeared in several Spanish documents as Boadalquivi. For most of the 20th century historians thought the mission of San Buenaventura de Guadalquini had been located on Jekyll Island, but examination of previously known and newly discovered documentary evidence has identified Gualdalquini with St. Simons.

Many scholars in the early 20th century identified the people of San Buenaventura de Guadalquini as Guale. Hann cites evidence that the people of Guadalquini at least as early as 1580 were part of the Mocama people. Ashley, et al. suggest that Gualdalquini may have been occupied by the Guale people when Europeans arrived in southeastern Georgia in the 16th century, and that the original Guale population on Guadalquini was displaced from at least the southern part of the island after the Guale rebellion of 1597, and replaced by Timucua speaking Mocama people.

== San Buenaventura ==
Two French ships visited Guadalquini in 1580, in an attempt to recruit coastal tribes to attack the Spanish presidio at Santa Elena (on what is now Parris Island, South Carolina). About 1,000 warriors from towns along the Georgia and South Carolina coast besieged Santa Elena for a couple of weeks, but left without success. The mission of San Buenaventura was established on the southern end of Guadalquini sometime between 1597 and 1609 (probably near the present-day St. Simons Island Light) and was the northernmost mission in the Mocama area. The mission was 32 leagues from St. Augustine.

San Buenaventura de Gualdalquini mission was the site of a Franciscan provincial chapter meeting in 1618, because food was cheaper there than in St. Augustine, and friars could travel there by canoe from the missions in the Guale and Timucua provinces, including the missions in the St. Johns River valley.

The governor of Florida, Alonso de Aranguiz y Cortes, stationed Spanish soldiers at San Buenaventura after Chichimecos (the Spanish name for Westos) destroyed the Santo Domingo de Talaje mission (on the Altamaha River) in 1661. Raiders from the Chichimeco, Uchise (the Spanish name for Muscogee), and Chiluque (a name the Spanish used for a faction of the Mocamo and for Yamassee), and possibly other nations, aided and supported by the English in the Province of Carolina, attacked Gualdalquini's neighbor Colon (Note: Colon (also called San Simon) was a village of un-christianized Yamasee, the first town to the north of San Buenaventura on Guadalquini Island. The Yamasee may have moved to Guadalquini Island from the town of Colon, in Escamaçu Province (the coast from the Savannah River to Santa Elena) in present-day South Carolina. They had first appeared in Escamaçu Province in the 1660s.) in 1680. A force of Spanish soldiers and Native Americans from San Buenaventura went to the aid of Colon. The raiders withdrew, and then attacked the mission of Santa Catalina de Guale on St. Catherines Island to the north. In 1684, raiding parties sponsored by the Province of Carolina attacked missions in the Guale and Mocama provinces.

Information on the population of the mission is scanty. A (possibly incomplete) census in 1675 reported 40 Christians at the mission. In 1681 a census reported 45 men and 42 women over the age of 12.

The mission of Santa Isabel de Utinahica may have been merged into San Buenaventura around the middle of the 17th century. Clara, cacica (female chief) of Utinihica, was still resident in the relocated mission of Santa Cruz y San Buenaventura de Guadalquini in 1685.

== Santa Cruz ==
In 1683, St. Augustine was attacked by a pirate fleet. Together with the attacks on the missions along what is now the Georgia coast from Native American allies of the English, the pirate raid led Governor Juan Márquez Cabrera to order those missions to move closer to St. Augustine. As part of the plan, the mission of San Buenaventura was to be merged with the mission San Juan del Puerto. Before the mission could be moved, pirates returned to the area in the second half of 1684. On hearing of the presence of the pirates, Lorenzo de Santiago, chief of San Buenaventura, moved the people of his village, along with most of their property and stored maize, to the mainland. When the pirates landed at San Buenaventura, they found only ten men under a sub-chief who had been left to guard the village. The San Buenaventura men withdrew to the woods, and the pirates burned the village and mission.

After the pirates burned the mission, the people of Guadalquini moved to a site on the north side of the St. Johns River about one league west of San Juan del Puerto, where a new mission named Santa Cruz de Guadalquini was established. (Note: Some historians have written that the new location was only three leagues from St. Augustine, primarily due to a comment in Jonathan Dickinson's Journal. Worth presents evidence that Santa Cruz de Guadalquini was established on the north shore of the St. Johns River near the mission San Juan del Puerto, and that the site near St. Augustine mistakenly identified as the Santa Cruz mission by Dickinson was actually the site of the Nuestra Señora de Guadalupe de Tolomato mission.) The mission was probably placed on a site known as Vera Cruz to the Spanish, the site of a visita (outlying mission site of the San Juan mission) that had been abandoned fifty years earlier, which may account for the adoption of the name Santa Cruz.

In 1685 residents of Santa Cruz asked that Guales, people from Colon, and other Yamassees be allowed to join the village. There were 60 families in Santa Cruz in 1689, twice as many as at San Juan. In 1695, residents of Santa Cruz included chiefs from San Simon and Colon, who were not Mocama.

== San Juan ==
The mission of Santa Cruz was merged into the mission of San Juan del Puerto by 1697. Lorenzo de Santiago, who had been chief of the town of San Buenaventura on Guadalquini before it moved in 1684, had become the chief of San Juan by 1701. It appears that most of the residents of San Juan in 1701 had come from the Guadalquini mission. Some of the residents there had come from the village of Colon that had been to the north of the San Buenaventura mission on Guadalquini. Lorenzo de Santiago, who had been chief of Guadalquini for many years, became the principal chief in Mocama Province.

The people at San Juan in 1701 wanted to move to a location south of the St. Johns River called Piritirica, but the Governor in St. Augustine required a town be kept at San Juan for early detection of attacks by the English or their native allies. Some of the inhabitants of Santa Cruz were allowed to move to Piritihica, which was three leagues from Santa Cruz across the St.Johns River, and residents who remained at Santa Cruz were allowed to cultivate fields at Piritihica.

The mission at San Juan del Puerto, the new settlement at Piritihica, and the other remaining Spanish missions along the coast north of the St. Johns River, were destroyed in 1702 by soldiers from the Province of Carolina and their native allies. The residents of the missions fled to St. Augustine shortly before the attacks.

== Piritihica ==
Shortly after the English and their native allies abandoned their siege of St. Augustine and withdrew north, the Spanish and Guale and Mocama natives returned to Piritihica. The Spanish built a stockade, and settled the natives in villages to the north and south of the stockade. One village was for the Guale, who had fled the missions on Amelia Island. The other village held the Mocama refugees from San Juan del Puerto, who included the people who had once lived at San Buenaventura de Guadalquini. One-and-a-half years later, natives allied with the English attacked Piritihica, killing or carrying off many of the inhabitants. The survivors from the Mocama village, some of whom had once lived on Guadalquini Island, were resettled in Palica, a village five leagues from St. Augustine, the fourth time they had moved in twenty years.

== Black Hammock Island ==
Archaeologists have excavated a site on Black Hammock Island in the Timucuan Ecological and Historic Preserve that may be the site of the Santa Cruz mission. The Cedar Point archaeological site (8Du81) is at the south end of Black Hammock Island, and has been occupied off and on for over 4,000 years, from the Archaic period until the 20th century.

== See also ==
- Spanish missions in Florida
- Spanish missions in Georgia
