= Georgia Martyrs =

Five Spanish Franciscan friars killed in 1597

Blessed Georgia Martyrs OFM
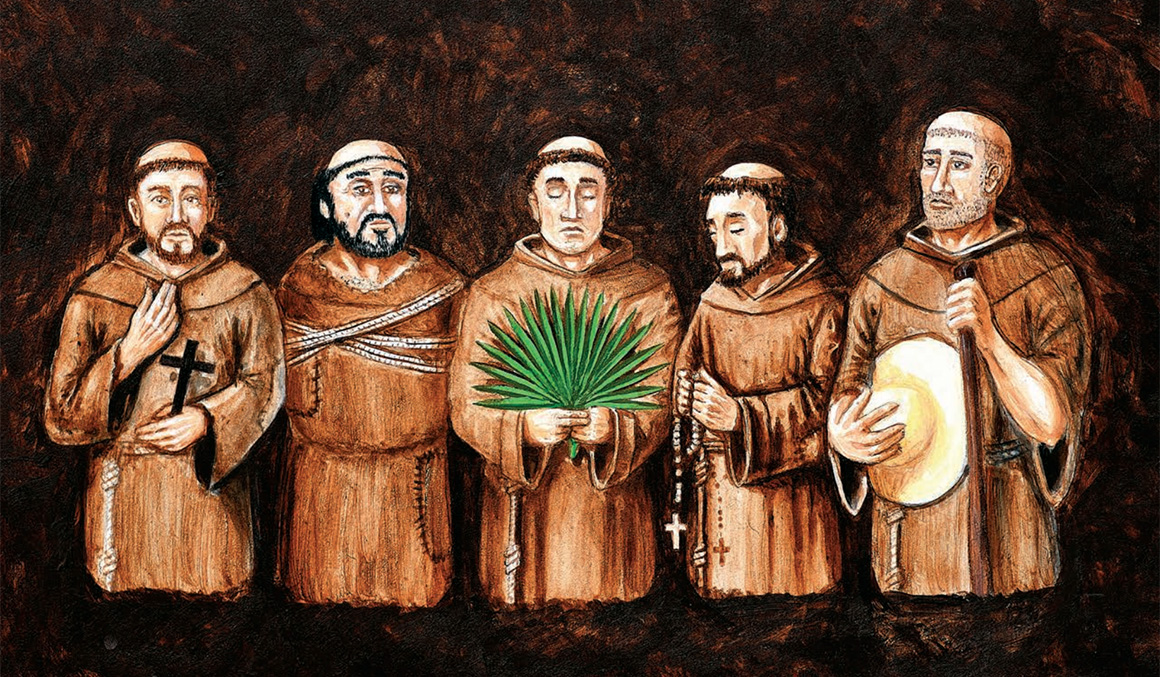
- The five Georgia Martyrs

Martyrs
- Died: September 1597; Spanish Florida (present-day coastal Georgia, United States)
- Venerated in: Catholic Church
- Beatified: 31 October 2026, Savannah Convention Center, Savannah, Georgia, United States by Pope Leo XIV
- Feast: 22 September

The Georgia Martyrs were five Spanish Franciscan friars killed in September 1597 during an uprising among the Guale people in Spanish Florida, in what is now coastal Georgia, United States. They were Pedro de Corpa, Blas Rodríguez, Miguel de Añon, Antonio de Badajoz and Francisco de Veráscola. Four were priests; Antonio was a lay brother.

Traditional accounts connect the killings to a dispute over the missionaries' opposition to polygyny. Subsequent scholarship contextualizes the motives behind these killings within the wider encounter between Guale communities and Spanish authorities.

The Catholic Church venerates the five friars as martyrs. They were beatified on 31 October 2026 in Savannah at a ceremony presided over by Cardinal Frank Leo, acting as the representative of Pope Leo XIV.

== Historical background ==
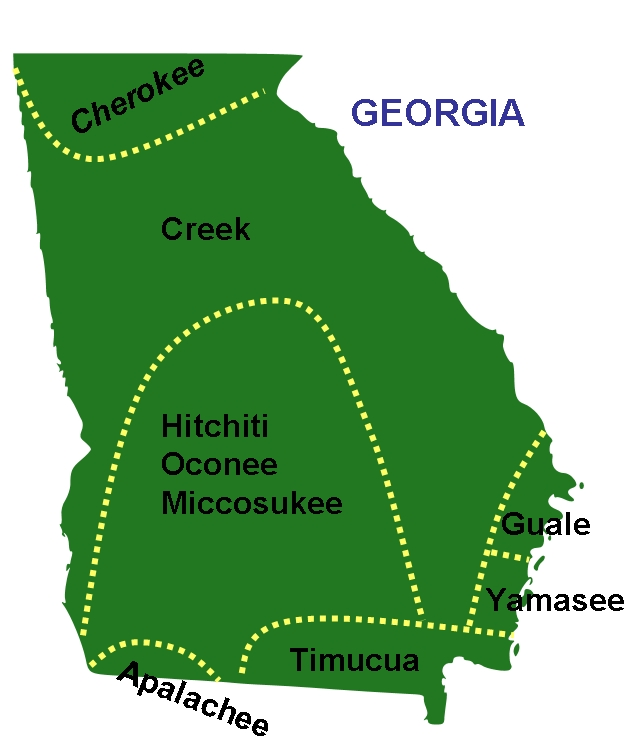
Generalized map of Indigenous peoples associated with present-day Georgia, showing the Guale along the Atlantic coast.

Franciscan missionary activity on the Georgia coast expanded following the arrival of a group of friars from Spain in 1587. By the end of 1595, missions had been established in at least five principal Guale towns, as well as among the Mocama farther south. The missions formed part of the northern frontier of Spanish Florida, whose colonial settlement at St. Augustine served as a center of Spanish administration.

The missions oversaw Catholic religious instruction while incorporating native communities into Spain's global imperial system. Guale micos (political leaders, or chiefs) maintained substantial authority over secular affairs and often requested missionaries, who could act as intermediaries in dealings with Spanish officials. Alliances with Spain also provided micos with access to trade goods and opportunities to strengthen their political standing.

== The friars ==
The five friars were stationed in four Guale communities when they were killed. A sixth Franciscan, Francisco de Ávila, was assigned to Talapo and survived the uprising.

Friars killed in the 1597 uprising
| Name | Status | Mission or community |
|---|---|---|
| Pedro de Corpa | Priest | Tolomato |
| Blas Rodríguez | Priest | Tupiqui |
| Miguel de Añon | Priest | Guale Island, now St. Catherines Island |
| Antonio de Badajoz | Lay brother | Guale Island, now St. Catherines Island |
| Francisco de Veráscola | Priest | Asao |

Antonio had arrived in Florida in 1587 and learned the Guale language. He served as an interpreter for Miguel at the mission on Guale Island.

== The 1597 uprising ==
=== Accounts of the killings ===
In the traditional account, Juanillo, a baptized Guale man expected to succeed to the office of mico mayor (paramount leader), came into conflict with Pedro de Corpa after seeking to take a second wife. Corpa opposed the marriage on religious grounds. Juanillo subsequently organized an attack on the friar at Tolomato, followed by attacks on other missions. This account, maintained by the Diocese of Savannah, identifies Corpa as the first of the five friars killed and dates his death to 14 September 1597.

The other four friars were killed at Tupiqui, Guale Island and Asao. Ávila was taken captive and held for approximately ten months before Spanish authorities secured his release in 1598.

An influential narrative was written by the Franciscan Luis Jerónimo de Oré and published in 1619, more than twenty years after the killings. Oré's work included an account of Ávila's captivity that he said he had copied from the survivor's own narrative. In a review of modern research on the uprising, Katherine Egner noted the enduring influence of Oré's account, particularly its identification of Juanillo as the principal leader and opposition to polygamy as the motive.

=== Historical interpretations ===
In Murder and Martyrdom in Spanish Florida (2011), J. Michael Francis and Kathleen M. Kole went back to the testimony, letters and other records of the uprising. They found that the surviving record cannot settle who was responsible for the killings or why. The documents also bring the political world of Indigenous leaders into view: rivalries, shifting alliances and competition for power. Egner described their research as challenging the adequacy of an explanation centered on Juanillo's reaction to the missionaries' opposition to Guale marriage practices.

Associated Press reporting in 2026 noted that some historians interpret the friars' deaths as part of a violent struggle between Guale political rivals, in which the missionaries may not have been the principal targets. The report also emphasized that surviving accounts were recorded from a colonial perspective.

== Aftermath and archaeology ==
Governor Gonzalo Méndez de Canzo investigated the killings and conducted a punitive expedition into Guale territory. Spanish troops burned buildings and destroyed crops. In 1598, a young Guale captive named Lucas confessed under threat of torture to having been present at the killing of Blas Rodríguez. He was subsequently convicted and hanged in St. Augustine.

The uprising interrupted Franciscan missionary activity in Guale territory. Early in the seventeenth century, the Franciscans returned to Guale communities and established missions again.

Part of the story survives in the ground. Archaeologists from the American Museum of Natural History located the remains of Mission Santa Catalina de Guale on St. Catherines Island in 1981. Their excavations revealed an earlier church that had burned, probably in September 1597, and the church that replaced it in 1604. They also recovered fragments of bronze bells bearing evidence of deliberate damage. Archaeologist David Hurst Thomas suggested that the bells were damaged during the uprising. Most of the excavated mission evidence dates to the seventeenth century.

== Catholic veneration and beatification ==
Efforts to advance the friars' cause for beatification developed during the twentieth century. United States bishops proposed them as candidates in the 1950s, and members of the Franciscan order undertook historical research. The Diocese of Savannah opened their cause in February 1984 under Bishop Raymond W. Lessard. The historical documentation behind the cause reached Rome for review in 2007.

On 27 January 2025, Pope Francis authorized the Dicastery for the Causes of Saints to issue a decree recognizing the friars as martyrs. In the Church's judgment, they had been killed in odium fidei, or "in hatred of the faith".

The friars' beatification followed on 31 October 2026, at the Savannah Convention Center. Cardinal Frank Leo, archbishop of Toronto, presided as papal delegate and read Pope Leo XIV's apostolic letter proclaiming the five friars blessed. The letter established 22 September as their liturgical memorial.

=== Muscogee (Creek) Nation response ===
[T]he history of the Guale people extends far beyond those events and deserves to be understood in its own right.

— RaeLynn A. Butler, Muscogee (Creek) Nation

In a statement published ahead of the beatification, RaeLynn A. Butler, secretary of culture and humanities for the Muscogee (Creek) Nation, acknowledged the ceremony's significance to Catholics and expressed respect for the Church's desire to honor the friars. The statement called the killings tragic and emphasized the wider setting: a violent period of Spanish colonization in which Indigenous peoples struggled to preserve sovereignty and cultural traditions.

The Nation also emphasized its enduring ties to the Georgia coast and its work to protect ancestral cultural sites, sacred places and burial grounds in the region.
