= Battle of Guadalupe Island (1595) =

1595 naval battle in the Caribbean

Coordinates: 16.1736°N 61.2243°W

- Part of the Anglo-Spanish War (1585–1604)
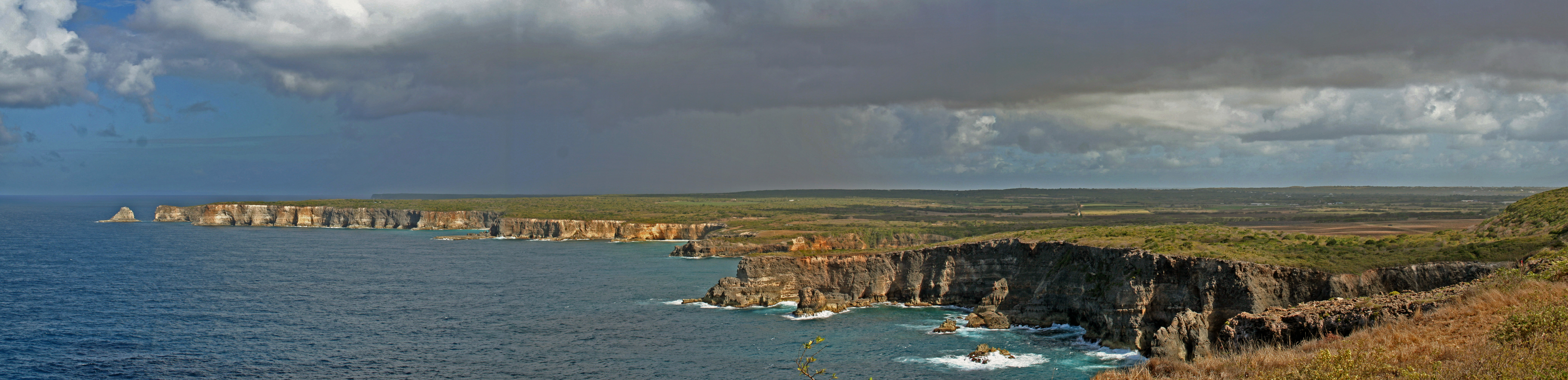
- Panoramic view from Guadalupe Island.
Date	8 November 1595
Location	Off Guadalupe Island, Caribbean Sea
Result	Spanish victory

Belligerents
England	Spain

Commanders and leaders
Francis Drake	Pedro Tello de Guzmán

Strength
9 ships	5 frigates

Casualties and losses
1 ship captured 45 killed and 25 captured	Light

The Battle of Guadalupe Island, also known as the Battle of Guadalupe, was a naval action that took place off Guadalupe Island (French: Guadeloupe), Caribbean Sea, on 8 November 1595, between a Spanish force of five frigates commanded by Don Pedro Tello de Guzmán and Don Gonzalo Méndez de Cancio (who was appointed Admiral on 19 August 1595), and an English squadron of nine ships (rear of Francis Drake's fleet), during the unsuccessful English military expedition of 1595 against Spain and their possessions, led by Sir Francis Drake himself, Sir John Hawkins and Sir Thomas Baskerville, as the context of the Anglo-Spanish War (1585–1604). The result was a Spanish victory.

One of the English ships, the Francis, was captured and the others fled from the battle. Then, knowing Drake's plans, the Spanish flotilla took advantage over the bulk of Drake's fleet, and arrived at San Juan on 13 November, reinforcing the town with 500 soldiers and supplies. The Spaniards organized different artillery positions in strategic locations, and the five frigates were positioned to cover the entrance of the bay with their artillery, awaiting the arrival of Drake. On 22 November, with the defenses completed, the English fleet arrived off San Juan and tried to invade the town. The result was another Spanish victory over Drake's forces.

== See also ==
- Spanish Main
- Battle of Las Palmas
- Battle of San Juan (1595)
- Guadalupe Island
- Fort San Felipe del Morro
