= Nuestra Señora de Guadalupe de Tolomato =

Spanish mission in Georgia, US

Nuestra Señora de Guadalupe de Tolomato (also called simply Mission Tolomato; in Spanish: Our Lady of Guadalupe - or Guadeloupe - of Tolomato) was a Spanish Catholic mission founded in 1595 in what is now the state of Georgia, located north of the lands of the southernmost Native American Guale chiefdom, Asao-Talaxe.

Between the 17th and 18th centuries, the mission was re-established in several places. It was first destroyed in 1597 during the Native American uprising known as Juanillo's Revolt, which led to the martyrdom of five Fransicans. The mission was rebuilt in 1605 at the Native American village Espogache. In the mid-1620s a new Tolomato mission was built at Guana near the capital of Florida, St. Augustine. After the destruction of the Guana mission in 1702 by James Moore, the Governor of Carolina, and Colonel Robert Daniels, another mission was established in Guale.

== History ==
The Tolomato mission became one of the centers of the Guale chiefdom in Georgia. Although the Guale Indians had had regular contact with the Franciscans since 1573, the mission was not founded, according to Lanning, until 1595 by the Spanish friar Pedro Ruiz, but more recent scholarship indicates that Friar Pedro Corpa was the founder of the mission, having arrived at the village of Tolomato in 1587, accompanied by Governor Hugo de Avendaño .

This mission acquired notoriety in 1597, when Juanillo, a Guale mico, or chieftain, led a revolt against the missionary presence in Spanish Florida and the cultural subjugation suffered by the indigenous population under the domination of the Spanish and Criollo authorities. This revolt, sometimes called the Gualean Revolt, was the first and longest-lasting Guale revolt to arise in Florida. The revolt began with the slaying of Friar Pedro Corpa, after which the tribe killed four more Franciscans and enslaved Friar Francisco Dávila, who was later liberated by the Spanish governor of Florida, Gonzalo Mendez de Cancio. The Indians attacked and burned the missions and churches in the area, but the revolt ended when an expedition led by the chieftain Asao, an ally of the Spanish, assaulted Juanillo's camp, killing him with 24 of his main supporters. The deaths of the principal actors in the uprising brought a temporary peace to Florida. The Tolomato people settled in St. Catherines Island, Georgia, where they lived until the middle 1600s.

The mission was not reestablished until 1605, when it was rebuilt in the Native American village of Espogache under the direction of Friar Diego Delgado. The mission was modified several times between 1605 and 1680, including the addition of several new structural elements.

In the mid-1620s, some of the Tolomato people who had survived the revolt of 1597 against the Spanish missions settled at Guana, three leagues north of St. Augustine, where the Spanish authorities created a new Tolomato mission intended to be a way station for a ferry service to San Juan del Puerto. In 1702, Governor Moore and Colonel Robert Daniels destroyed the mission. In 1717, another Tolomato mission was established in Guale, but the exact site is unknown.

== See also ==
- Tolomato Cemetery
