= Santa Catalina de Guale =

Spanish mission in Georgia (US state)

Santa Catalina de Guale (1602-1702) was a Spanish Franciscan mission and town in Spanish Florida. Part of Spain's effort to convert the Native Americans to Catholicism, Santa Catalina served as the provincial headquarters of the Guale mission province. It also served various non-religious functions, such as providing food and labor for the colonial capital of St. Augustine. The mission was located on St. Catherines Island from 1602 to 1680, then on Sapelo Island from 1680 to 1684, and finally on Amelia Island from 1684 to 1702.

== History ==
The mission Santa Catalina de Guale was founded in 1602 on St. Catherines Island, one of the Sea Islands of the present-day U.S. state of Georgia. It was probably associated with a Guale village known today as the archaeological site "Wamassee Head", on St. Catherines Island.

During the 17th century the Guale people experienced a dramatic population loss, mainly due to epidemic diseases. This resulted in the consolidation of mission settlements. By 1675 the Guale mission village of San Diego de Satuache was incorporated with Santa Catalina de Guale. Likewise the mission villages of Santa Clara de Tupiqui and San Joseph de Sapala were merged.

After two major slave raiding attacks in 1680, the Santa Catalina de Guale mission was moved south to Sapelo Island. The attacking force consisted of about 300 Westo Indians who had been armed, supplied, and encouraged to attack Spanish missions by English colonial authorities in South Carolina. Santa Catalina de Guale was the first to fall. Its defenses included a recently built stone fort, 6 Spanish soldiers, and about 40 Christian Indians. Other missions in the region quickly fell to the slave raiders.

Relocated to Sapelo Island, the four original mission villages of Tupiqui, Sapala, Satuache, and Santa Catalina were merged in one. Thus the old intervillage hierarchical political system of the Guale chiefdom was lost, although the chiefly lineages associated with each village were retained. As a result, the Santa Catalina de Guale population contained many titular leaders lacking actual roles as village headmen.

In 1683 the French pirate Michel de Grammont raided Spanish Florida settlements, including St. Augustine and the Mocama mission province, forcing further southward migrations. In 1684 the Santa Catalina de Guale mission was moved to Amelia Island in present-day Florida. The appearance of other pirates in 1684 prevented the nearby missions of Santo Domingo de Asao and San Buenaventura de Guadalquini from moving south. Both were burned. Their inhabitants fled to the mainland.

By 1685 the Guale peoples had either fled inland, joining unconverted groups such as the Yamasee, or had relocated to Amelia Island's three settlement of Santa Catalina de Guale, San Felipe, and Santa Clara de Tupiqui.

In 1702, during Queen Anne's War, the Carolina Governor James Moore launched an invasion of Spanish Florida. In the process the settlements on Amelia Island, including Santa Catalina de Guale, were destroyed. The surviving inhabitants who remained under the Spanish mission system moved to the vicinity of St. Augustine.

== See also ==
- Spanish missions in Florida
- Spanish missions in Georgia
