= Guale =

Historic Indigenous people of coastal Georgia, United States

- Irene-style pottery fragment displayed at the Fernbank Museum of Natural History

Regions with significant populations
- Coastal Georgia and the Sea Islands

Languages
- Guale, an unclassified language

Related ethnic groups
- Yamasee

The Guale were an Indigenous people whose homeland was the coast and Sea Islands of what is now Georgia. The Spanish Empire also used the name Guale for a mission province it established there as part of Spanish Florida.

Spanish missionaries began arriving in Guale towns in the 1560s. In the two centuries that followed, warfare, enslavement, epidemics, and other pressures of empire forced many Guale people from coastal towns, sometimes more than once. Some survivors went south to mission settlements in Spanish Florida. Others joined the Yamasee and other Indigenous communities. These migrations contributed to ethnogenesis, the formation of new communities from people of different backgrounds. Guale people and their descendants remained part of other communities for generations after the coastal towns dispersed.

== Homeland and political organization ==
Modern map of the Sea Islands, including Ossabaw, St. Catherines, and Sapelo islands along the Georgia coast.

Some Guale communities lived on Sapelo and St. Catherines islands. Others lived on the mainland, including the lower Altamaha and Ogeechee river areas. They also built towns along the coast's tidal waterways. During the mission period, populations moved and settlements merged. In 1655, a Spanish list named six missions in Guale. Santa Catalina de Guale, San Joseph de Sapala, and Santo Domingo de Talaje were three of them.

Guale political leaders were known in Spanish records as micos, a term commonly translated as leaders or chiefs. Town councils included other officials and leading members of the community. Spanish sources identified Don Francisco of Tolomato in 1597 as a mico mayor, or paramount leader.

Leadership and inheritance were connected to matrilineal kin groups. At Ospogue on Sapelo Island, a lineage of Guale leaders continued into the eighteenth century, even as the town was repeatedly destroyed and relocated.

== Language ==
Guale is an unclassified language, with too little surviving evidence to establish its relationship to other languages. The language catalogue Glottolog lists Guale as unattested. The vocabulary once used to classify Guale as Muskogean was Muscogee, with no evidence that it had been collected from Guale speakers. Shared political titles have also been regarded as insufficient evidence for a Muskogean classification.

A grammar of Guale attributed to Domingo Agustín Váez, a Jesuit brother, dates to 1569. A Franciscan named Tomás de Aguilar worked among communities near St. Augustine in the 1720s and 1730s. Records call him a "professor of the Indian language of Guale". Neither Váez nor Aguilar left any writings known to survive.

Guale
- Native to: United States
- Region: Georgia
- Ethnicity: Guale
- Extinct: ca. 1700; perhaps became Yamasee
- Language family: unclassified

Language codes
- ISO 639-3: None (mis)
- Glottolog: gual1239

Scholars have not reached a consensus on how to classify the Guale language. Early claims that the Guale spoke a Muskogean language were questioned by the historian William C. Sturtevant. He has shown that recorded vocabulary, which sources had believed to be Guale, was Muscogee. Only two words are known otherwise, being micoo 'chief' and Chiluques 'Cusabo'.

Historical references note that the Jesuit Brother Domingo Agustín Váez recorded Guale grammar in 1569, but the documents have not yet been found.

== History ==
=== Before European colonization ===
Archaeological studies indicate that the Guale lived along the Georgia coast and Sea Islands, from at least 1150 AD. Archaeologists identify the Guale as the makers of the Savannah phase (1150 to 1300 AD) and the Irene phase (1300 to circa 1600). While the prehistoric ancestors of the Guale shared many characteristics with regional neighbors, they left unique archaeological features that distinguished the "proto-Guale" people from other groups.

The prehistoric people were organized into polities. They built Mississippian-type platform mounds, major earthworks requiring the organized labor of many people, and using highly skilled soil and engineering knowledge. They used the mounds for ceremonial, religious and burial purposes.

Ceremonies and burials took place at platform mounds and other earthworks. People organized the work of building them. They lived in large towns and smaller settlements associated archaeologically with the Guale and the Savannah and Irene phases of coastal Mississippian culture.

The plaza, mounds, and household shell deposits at Middle Place mark a settlement of more than 272 acres on Ossabaw Island. It was occupied from about 1100 to 1525 CE. Oyster shells from the site suggest that its residents managed local shellfish stocks over time.

The Guale ate crops they grew, animals they hunted, wild plants they gathered, and fish and shellfish from the estuaries. There is still disagreement about how much they depended on farming. How much they moved with the seasons is also disputed. Some early European descriptions were written during drought and disruption.

=== European contact ===
Jean Ribault's French expedition encountered Guale people in 1562, whom they called the Oade after their leader, while traveling along North America's Atlantic coast. Oade, a Guale mico named in French records, supplied maize and beans to Charlesfort, the French settlement on Parris Island in present-day South Carolina. The Guale maintained good relations with

When the Spanish later established themselves in St. Augustine in Spanish Florida, they also contacted the Guale. They soon tried to bring them into their mission system. The Guale territory became one of the four primary mission provinces of Spanish Florida; the Timucua, Mocama, and Apalachee Provinces, also named after the resident tribes of their countries, were the others. Jesuits first disrupted the Guale in the 1560s, with a more lasting Franciscan mission system instituted later in the century, with another group of friars arriving in 1587 and missions in at least five principal Guale towns by the end of 1595. Beginning in 1565, Spain based most of these operations out of St. Augustine.

The extent of the Guale Province was along the Atlantic coast and Sea Islands, north of the Altamaha River and south of the Savannah River. It included Ossabaw, St. Catherine's, Sapelo, Tybee, and Wassaw islands, among others. By the mid-17th century, the Spanish had established six Catholic missions in Guale territory, including Nuestra Señora de Guadalupe de Tolomato and Santa Catalina de Guale. Their largest settlements were probably on St. Catherine's Island.

Guale was the least stable of the four major mission provinces. The first Guale rebellion, often labeled Juanillo's Revolt, began on October 4, 1597. During the rebellion five spanish Franciscans were killed: Pedro de Corpa, Blas de Rodríguez, Miguel de Añón, Antonio de Badajoz and Francisco de Veráscola who are considered martyrs by the Catholic Church. The Guale rebelled again 1645, nearly shaking off the missions. They kept up a clandestine trade with French privateers, which provided them with alternate sources of goods.

==== Effect on health ====
After the arrival of Europeans and their colonization of Guale territory, the Guale increased their consumption of corn. Bioarchaeologists tested the levels of C4 molecules in the natives' bones to determine the corn intake levels. By comparison, their intake of other foods such as fish, animals, other plants, etc. decreased. These changes were not for the better, as a corn-dominated diet is poor for overall health.

The Guale Indians were forced to work under the Europeans in ways they had never had to before. It was labor-intensive. Spencer Larsen and Christopher Ruff concluded this based on their analysis of the second moments of area on humerus and femur bones. This is an engineering approach used to show the strength of the bone. They found that there was an increased strength of the bones due to higher repetitive usage, supporting the original statement.

=== Spanish missions and Guale politics ===
Guale was one of Spanish Florida's mission provinces. Others included Mocama, Timucua, and Apalachee. Missions were generally small compounds within larger Indigenous towns. A church and a friar's residence connected these communities to St. Augustine through religious instruction, diplomacy, trade, and demands for forced labor.

Guale micos maintained substantial authority over secular affairs. Invitations to missionaries often came from the micos, who could call on a resident friar to represent them in disputes with Spanish officials. Imported goods and military support were further reasons for some leaders to cultivate ties with the mission system.

St. Augustine obtained food and forced labor from Guale and other Indigenous communities. Under the repartimiento, Spanish officials compelled Indigenous men to travel there for farm work, construction, and other assigned labor. Guale micos organized the local drafts.

Guale potters made wares in local ceramic traditions for Guale households and for resident Spanish missionaries and soldiers. Iron tools, glass beads, and European cloth were also used.

=== The 1597 uprising ===
In September 1597, five Spanish Franciscans were killed in Guale towns: Pedro de Corpa, Blas Rodríguez, Miguel de Añon, Antonio de Badajoz, and Francisco de Veráscola. Francisco de Ávila survived the attacks and was enslaved for almost ten months.

Both responsibility for the attacks and the motives behind them are disputed. The traditional narrative identifies Juanillo as the organizer and attributes the attacks to the friars' opposition to polygyny. Political rivalries and shifting alliances among Guale leaders have also been proposed as explanations.

Governor Gonzalo Méndez de Canzo led a punitive expedition into Guale territory. His forces burned buildings and destroyed crops. Spanish officials questioned Lucas, a young Guale prisoner, in 1598. The confession came under threat of torture: he said he had been present at one of the killings. He was subsequently convicted and executed in St. Augustine.

The Spanish later supported Domingo of Asao against Don Francisco and Juanillo, who were killed by Domingo's forces in 1601. Franciscans began establishing missions in Guale communities again in the early 1600s.

=== Labor, diet, and health ===
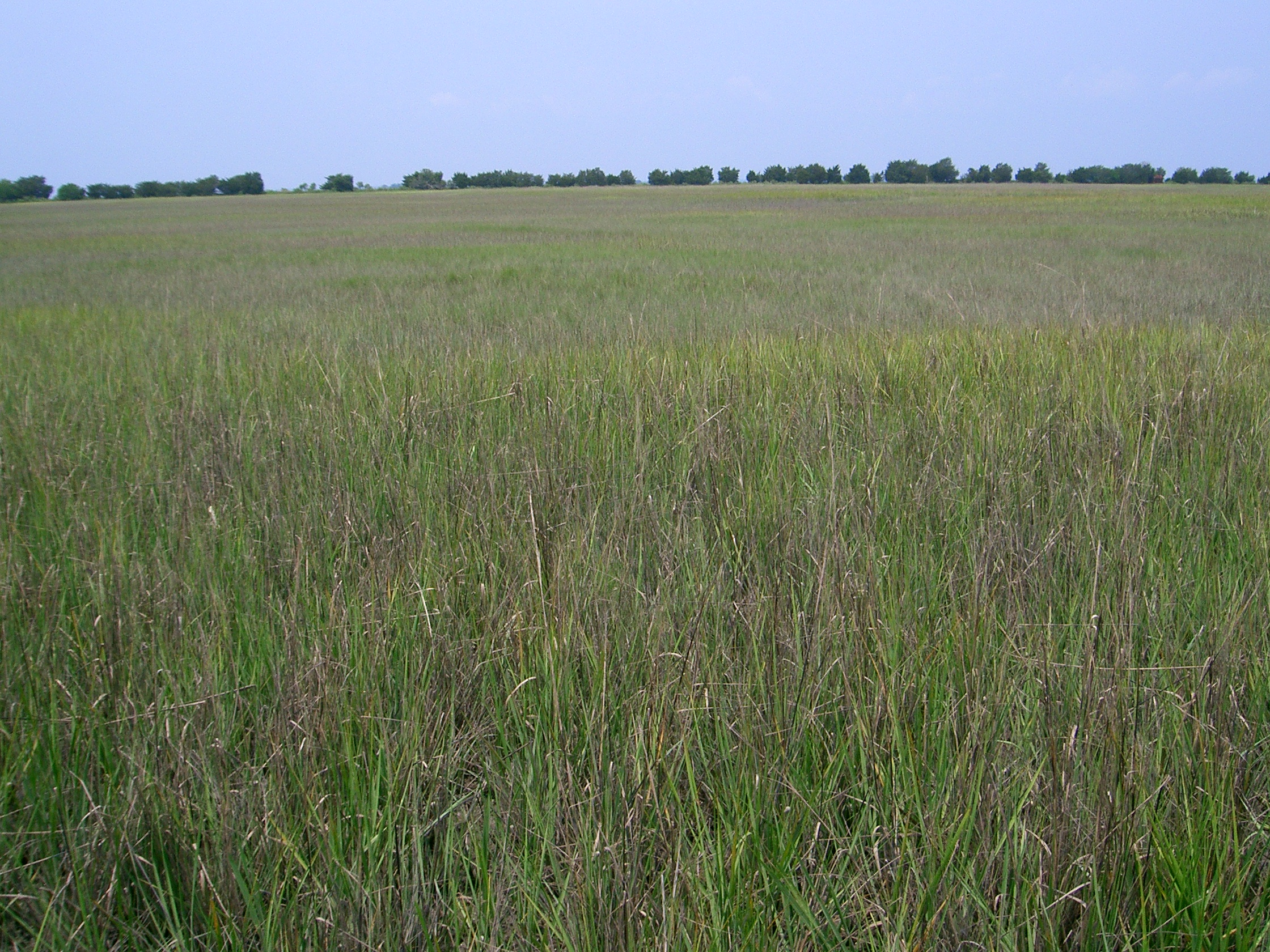
Salt marsh on Sapelo Island. Estuarine foods remained important to coastal communities during the mission period.

Maize was already part of the Guale diet before European colonization. At St. Catherines and Amelia islands, diets during the mission period contained a greater proportion of maize. Carbon and nitrogen isotope analysis of human remains indicates that shift and changes in the balance of marine and other foods.

Mission populations appear to have done more physically demanding work, as indicated by structural changes in arm and leg bones and by records of forced labor. More tooth decay, nutritional stress, and infection have been linked to changes in their food and living conditions.

In 1645, Guale residents left mission towns while Spanish authorities still owed payment for their forced labor and provisions. Officials tried to force people back and take their leaders to St. Augustine. They continued seeking the return of those who had moved to Tama and Escamazu, as St. Augustine depended on their forced labor.

=== La Tama and Yamasee settlements ===
Various non-Guale Indigenous communities settled in or near the coastal mission provinces during the seventeenth century. Many came from the interior region called La Tama in Spanish records. During the 1660s, Westo raiders, armed through trade with English colonists, enslaved people and drove others from the interior toward the coast and other places of refuge, dispersing the La Tama in several directions. Some migrated to the lower Chattahoochee River towns of Coweta and Cussita, the Apalachee mission provinces, and the Guale province.

Yamasee towns appear among the Guale and Mocama missions by the 1670s, although some people recorded as Yamasee lived in the mission towns themselves. In 1675, the Spanish first used the term Yamasee to refer to the newcomer refugees. They thought them similar to the La Tama. In Guale Province, some of the Yamasee joined the existing missions, while others settled on the periphery. Colonial records put Tama people, Guale people, and people from other communities under the name Yamasee. These groups could speak different languages and have different relationships with Spanish authorities.

=== Raids and displacement ===
English traders demanded enslaved Indigenous people to settle debts for guns and ammunition. They had supplied the weapons on credit. Armed Indigenous allies raided other communities to capture and enslave people for sale. Many of those enslaved were women and children. The demand for enslaved people intensified warfare across the Southeast and brought attacks on Guale communities.

Between 1675 and 1684, the Westo tribe, supported by English colonists in the colonies of Carolina and Virginia, destroyed all Spanish missions in Georgia. Attacks by English-supported pirates also contributed to the breakup of the missions. In 1680, a group of pirates sacked Mission Santa Catalina de Guale. By 1684, the Spanish had abandoned all six missions.

The La Tama Yamasee, Guale, and other refugees scattered in the southeast. Some relocated to new missions in Spanish Florida, but most rejected Spanish authority. They felt Spain had been unable to protect them and resented their failure to provide firearms. The Guale moved mostly to the Apalachee or Apalachicola regions.

Spain withdrew its last missions from the Georgia coast in 1684. The retreat followed Westo attacks in 1661 and 1662 and further raids by other groups and pirates. Westo power collapsed in 1680–1681, but the raids continued. Communities fled first toward the barrier islands and then farther south.

Some displaced Guale settled in northeastern Florida under Spanish rule. Others lived among the Yamasee, Lower Creeks, or Apalachee. New settlements sometimes brought people from several former towns together. Town identities and leadership lineages could survive these moves.

=== Guale among the Yamasee ===
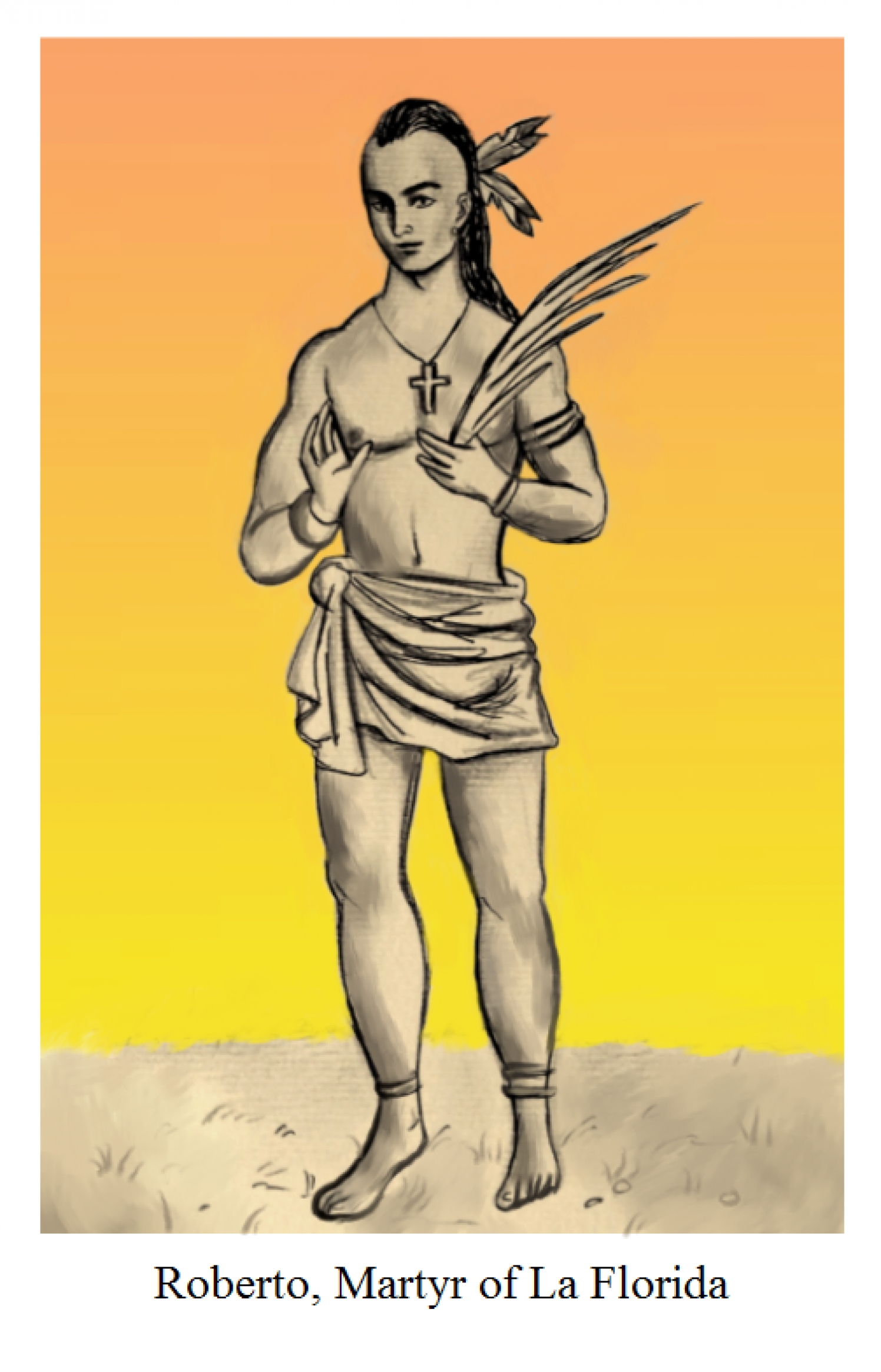
Yamasee Indian who was martyred in La Florida in 1740.

By 1684, groups identified in English records as Yamasee were moving to the southern frontier of Carolina. These included people of Tama and Guale origin. That year, a Scottish colony called Stuarts Town was founded on Port Royal Sound. Stuarts Town survived only about two years, but during that time, the Scots allied with the Yamasee. In late 1684, armed with Scottish firearms, these Indians raided Timucua Province, devastating the mission Santa Catalina de Afuyca. They returned to Stuarts Town with 22 captives, whom they sold as slaves. Over the next two years, word of similar successes was carried throughout the region. The population of "Yamasee" Indians near Port Royal Sound grew rapidly. Although the Indians became known collectively as "Yamasee", the Guale continued to be a significant portion of the population. Armed through this alliance, Yamasee raiders attacked mission communities in Spanish Florida in 1685 and enslaved people from those communities for sale. Spanish forces destroyed Stuarts Town in 1686. Spanish forces destroyed Stuart's Town. In the old Guale Province, they strongly resisted counterattacks by South Carolina. Nonetheless, the alliance between the Yamasee and colonial South Carolina grew stronger in reaction. The "Yamasee" who migrated in 1685 to the Port Royal area were attempting to rebuild the La Tama polity while including numerous Guale, as well as other Indians of mostly Muscogee.

The Guale continued to be a significant part of these communities. European records distinguished Upper and Lower Yamasee towns. The Upper Towns were predominantly Guale and included Pocotaligo, Pocosabo, and Huspah. The Lower Towns included Altamaha, Ocute, and Chechesee, whose names and populations were associated with Tama. Some other towns had mixed populations; the origins of others are uncertain. The Guale were the majority in the Upper Towns, although other tribes were incorporated as well. Upper Yamasee Towns with mostly Guale populations likely included Pocotaligo, Pocosabo, and Huspah. Other Upper Towns, such as Tulafina, Sadketche (Salkehatchie), and Tomatley, were possibly mixed, with Guale, La Tama, and others. It is possible that the La Tama had spent time in missions and become somewhat Christianized. They may have sought out the similarly missionized Guale.

Traders abused Indigenous people, colonists encroached on their land, and trade debts added to the disputes with Carolina. Relations worsened, and the Yamasee War began in 1715. Some of those who survived went to Spanish Florida or joined Lower Creek communities. The Yamasee lived in South Carolina until they were defeated in the Yamasee War, after which survivors were widely dispersed and the people disintegrated as a tribe. But while they lasted, the Yamasee exhibited multi-ethnic qualities. Their towns were described by European colonists as being Upper Yamasee or Lower Yamasee towns. The Lower Towns were populated mainly by La Tama Indians and included Altamaha (after the leader who lived there), Ocute, and Chechesee (Ichisi).

In 1702, when Carolina Governor James Moore led an invasion into Spanish Florida, his men destroyed the few "refugee missions" in Guale. By 1733, the Guale were so few in number that they were unable to resist James Oglethorpe's establishment of the Province of Georgia.

== Later communities and heritage ==
Carolina governor James Moore invaded Spanish Florida in 1702 with colonial forces and Indigenous allies. They overran the remaining Guale and Mocama settlements in northeastern Florida, and refugees fled toward St. Augustine. Surviving mission communities, including Guale people, eventually moved to Cuba with the Spanish evacuation of Florida in 1763.

Some citizens of the Muscogee (Creek) Nation and Seminole tribes are descended from the Guale.

In a 2026 statement, in advance of the Catholic Church beatifying the five friars killed in 1597, Muscogee Nation Secretary of Culture and Humanities, RaeLynn Butler, placed those killings within the context of Spanish cultural disruptions and Indigenous efforts to preserve sovereignty and cultural traditions. She also called for a fuller understanding of Guale history beyond the killings.

== Archaeological research ==
Altamaha-style pottery from the mission period, displayed at the Fernbank Museum of Natural History.

A team from the American Museum of Natural History located Santa Catalina de Guale on St. Catherines Island in 1981. Excavators found the remains of its church and residences, along with other parts of the settlement. Much of this material came from the seventeenth century. The artifacts were given to the Fernbank Museum of Natural History. Human remains examined during the research were reburied inside the church.

On many smaller islands, activity declined during the mission period. Yet people continued to use other places and began to occupy new ones. Regional surveys reported in 2013 recorded this pattern. Some Guale people may have used what they knew about waterways, tides, and food sources to move between places and resist Spanish control.

== See also ==
- Santa Catalina de Guale
- Spanish missions in Georgia
- Spanish missions in Florida
- Yamasee
