= Westo =

Ethnic group

Total population
- Extinct, merged with Muscogee and Seneca

Regions with significant populations
- Virginia, South Carolina, Georgia

Languages
- Iroquoian

Related ethnic groups
- Erie people and other Iroqouian tribes

The Westo were an Iroquoian Native American (Indian) tribe encountered in what became the Southeastern U.S. by Europeans in the 17th century. They probably spoke an Iroquoian language. The Spanish called these people Chichimeco (not to be confused with Chichimeca in Mexico), and Virginia colonists may have called the same people Richahecrian. Their first appearance in the historical record is as a powerful tribe in colonial Virginia who had migrated from the north into the region around present-day Richmond. Their population had a force of 700–900 warriors.

Early academic analysis of the origin of the Westo posited that the so-called Rechahecrian/Rickohakan of Virginia were perhaps Cherokee or Yuchi, and that the Westo were a band of Yuchi. Anthropologist Marvin T. Smith (1987:131–32) was the first to suggest that the Westo were a group of Erie, who had lived south of Lake Erie until forced to migrate further south to Virginia in the 1650s during the 17th-century Beaver Wars. The powerful nations of the Haudenosaunee League extended their control into a wider area to gain hunting grounds. Smith theorizes that as the colonial settlements expanded in Virginia, the Westo migrated south to Georgia and the Savannah River in 1659, a decade before the founding of South Carolina in 1670. Subsequent work by John Worth (1995:17) and Eric Bowne (2006) supports Smith's hypothesis.

From 1660 to 1680, the Westo, resident along the Savannah River near what became Augusta, Georgia, were slave raiders and middlemen in the slave trade in South Carolina. They menaced other Indian tribes in the region and the Spanish colony in Florida. In 1680, their power was destroyed by the Shawnee and other tribes allied with the colonists of South Carolina. The survivors became slaves themselves or took refuge among the Muscogee Creeks and the Seneca.

== History ==
Most authorities believe the Westos were the remnants of the Erie and other people living near the Great Lakes who were displaced or destroyed by the Haudenosaunee in the Beaver Wars of the 1640s and 1650s. Fleeing south, the group stopped at the James River near present day Richmond, Virginia. The colonists in Virginia called them Richahecrian or “Rickohockans”. In 1656, they defeated the Pamunkey and British colonists in Virginia in the Battle of Bloody Run. They were familiar with firearms and more battle-hardened that the Virginia Indians. William Byrd and other Virginia planters negotiated an agreement with the Rickohockans. The Indians would move south, capture slaves, and exchange them with Virginia for guns, ammunition, and other items. The name “Westo” apparently derived from the name of Byrd’s plantation “Westover.” The Spanish called them Chichimecos, a generic name they often applied to “uncivilized” Indians.

By 1659, the Westo had migrated from Virginia to the homeland of the old Ocute (La Tama) chiefdom near the present-day city of Macon. The Spanish in that year said they were attacking Indian tribes in the northern part of the Spanish colony. The Westo wreaked havoc on the Spanish missionary provinces of Guale and Mocama. In one raid, on July 20, 1661, a Westo war party canoed down the Altamaha River and destroyed the Spanish mission of Santo Domingo de Talaje near present-day Darien, Georgia. Florida governor Alonso de Aránguiz y Cortés sent troops to what is now St. Simons, Georgia to guard against further raids. As the Spanish prohibited selling guns to Indians, the better-armed Westos were successful in preying on other Indian tribes.

In 1663, the Westo moved to the Savannah River near present day Augusta, Georgia where their principal village was called Hickauhaugau. Its precise location has not been determined. The village had longhouses and pallisades typical of Iroquoian villages further north, strengthening the view that the Westo were Erie. Estimates of the number of Westo range from 600 to 2,000 warriors with the likelihood that they numbered 700 to 900 warriors and 3,000 or more persons.

In 1670, the first durable British colony was founded in South Carolina and in 1674 Henry Woodward visited the Westo and persuaded them to break ties with Virginia and instead supply South Carolina with Indian slaves, deerskins, and furs. Thousands of the Indian slaves were shipped to islands in the Caribbean Sea. A major destination was the sugar plantations of Barbados. From 1675 to 1680 the trade thrived, but other tribes acquired arms and began to engage in the slave trade. The Westo monopoly on slave trading began to decline and the British colonists began to get the upper hand. Moreover, the Westos had no allies among other Indian tribes. The colonists had attempted to create a buffer zone made up of friendly Indians, the so-called "settlement Indians", living around the British settlements, but were not successful in persuading the Westo to cease raids on Indian tribes friendly to the British. Moreover, in 1680, a raid on the Spanish Mission of Santa Catalina de Guale in Georgia forced the abandonment of the Mission but at a cost of casualties to the Westos while they captured no slaves.

The Westo monopoly as middlemen in the slave trade was also threatened by the appearance of a new tribe of migrants, the Savannah, a sub-tribe of the Shawnee, who appeared along the river. Initially friendly with the Westo, in 1679 the Savannah joined with the settlement Indians and the British colonists to attack the Westo and destroyed them as a regional power. The Shawnee replaced the Westo as the main purveyors of slaves, although they soon left South Carolina to migrate elsewhere.

In the wake of their defeat hundreds of Westo were auctioned off at the Charleston slave market and shipped to sugar plantations in the Caribbean. Six hundred Westos moved north and in 1682 joined the Seneca in New York. Another group of fifty to sixty warriors and their families joined the Lower Creeks in Coweta County, Georgia. A smaller group established a village called Woristo also among the Lower Creeks. The last mention of the Westo was in 1715 when a group of 16 warriors and their families settled among the Creeks near Macon.
