= Juanillo =

Chief of the Native American Tolomato people (died 1598)

- Died: May 1598; Guale, Georgia, United States
- Occupation: Tribal chief of the Native American Tolomato people in the chiefdom of Guale

Juanillo (fl. 1597 - died May 1598) was a chief of the Native American Tolomato people in the Guale chiefdom, in what is now the US state of Georgia. In September 1597, Juanillo led the so-called Gualean Revolt, or Juanillo's Revolt, against the cultural oppression of the indigenous population in Florida by the Spanish authorities and the Franciscan missionaries. This was the first and longest-lasting Guale rebellion in La Florida, and ended with the execution of Juanillo by a group of Native American allies of the Spanish, led by Chief Asao.

== Biography ==
Juanillo was mico, or chieftain, of the Tolomato, and heir to the chiefdom of Guale (clan organization was matrilineal). After the arrival of the Spanish colonizers in Florida, some chiefs of the Guale tribe, whose vast territory stretched from the Altamaha River to what is now Port Royal, were concerned about the spread of Christianity. Their grievances under the administration of the Spanish governor, Gonzalo Méndez de Canço, included the Franciscan missionaries forbidding the Indian practices of polygamy, divorce, dancing, games, and tribal wars. These proscriptions weakened his people, according to Juanillo, making them lose their courage and skill.

Juanillo's hatred of the Spanish missionaries was so intense that on the morning of September 13, 1597, his warriors killed the Franciscan Friar Corpa at the Tolomato mission. Juanillo's men beheaded Corpa and placed his head on a spike. The next day Juanillo called on the chiefs of the other Native American groups who were being expelled from their lands by the Spanish, and incited them to kill missionaries living in the region. The rebellion spread throughout the province of Guale, with most of the missions there attacked by the Indians and five Franciscans killed.

News of the rebellion reached St. Augustine in early October. De Canço, who was sick in bed, got up and organized a relief expedition that he led himself. The Indians in Guale were burning churches and maiming and killing missionaries. Unable to catch the Indian rebels, de Canço had to content himself with burning their villages and destroying their crops. He took one prisoner who told him about the death of the friar.

In May 1598, de Canço rescued the only missionary survivor of the Juanillo massacre, Friar Francisco Dávila, who had been enslaved by the Indians in the town of Tulufina, not far from Tolomato. De Canço's troops suppressed the rebellion, which ended decisively when an expedition of Indian allies of the Spanish, led by the mico (chief) of Asao, attacked Juanillo's stronghold in the stockaded town of Yfusinique, killing him with 24 of his main supporters. Their deaths brought a temporary peace to Florida.

== After the revolt ==
In May 1600, a delegation of Guale chiefs went to St. Augustine to swear obedience to King Philip III in the presence of Governor de Canço. He accepted their submission on certain conditions, above all that they must suppress any uprisings against the Spanish (others sources, however, indicate that the rebellion was actually suppressed by his successor, Pedro de Ibarra, who treated the indigenous peoples with kindness; his approach was successful in brokering the peace essential to the colony's development). In 1603, de Canço visited the Guale territory in order to assess the loyalty of the Indians and in order to receive new oaths of allegiance from them.
