= Gonzalo Méndez de Canço =

16/17th-century Spanish naval officer and colonial administrator of Florida

7th Governor of La Florida
- In office March 22, 1596/ June 1597 – February 1603/ October 1603
- Preceded by: Alonso de las Alas, Bartolomé de Argüelles and Juan Menendez Marquez
- Succeeded by: Pedro de Ibarra

Personal details
- Born: 1554 Tapia de Casariego, Asturias, Spain
- Died: March 31, 1622 (aged 67–68) Tapia de Casariego
- Spouse: Magdalena de Luazes Lugo
- Profession: Admiral and colonial governor

Gonzalo Méndez de Canço y Donlebún (alternatively spelled "de Cancio" or "de Canzo"; c. 1554 – March 31, 1622) was a Spanish admiral who served as the seventh governor of the Spanish province of La Florida (1596–1603). He fought in the Battle of San Juan (1595) against the English admiral Francis Drake. During his tenure as governor of Florida, he dealt severely with a rebellion known as Juanillo's revolt among the Native Americans in Guale, forcing them, as well as other tribes in Florida, to submit to Spanish domination. De Canço was best known, however, for promoting the cultivation of maize in the province, and for introducing its cultivation to Asturias, Spain, where it eventually became an important crop.

== Early life ==
Gonzalo Méndez de Canço was born in 1554 at Tapia de Casariego, in the parish of San Esteban de Tapia, Asturias, Spain. He was the son of Diego de Canço (or "de Cancio") Donlebún and Maria Mendez de San Julián y Villaamil, descendants of a family of hidalgos. Nothing of his childhood is known, but he joined the Armada de la Carrera de las Indias (Fleet of the West Indies Run) at age 14.

In 1571, at the age of 17, he traveled to America in the company of Sancho Pardo Osorio. In the course of his service to the Spanish Crown, de Canço provided three ships at his own expense for use by the royal navy. The first was called El Apóstol Santiago (The Apostle Santiago), an escort ship for Spanish merchants going to or coming from the Americas. During a return voyage from Mexico to Europe the ship was lost in the Atlantic at the latitude of Madeira. Not daunted by this setback, he ordered the construction of a ship similar to the first, called Nuestra Señora de Escontrela ("Our Lady of Escontrela"), of which he became captain. In 1584 de Canço sailed to the coast of the Panama isthmus with this ship, but ran aground at the entrance to the port of Nombre de Dios and lost the ship. The third ship, called Virgen de la Concepción ("Virgin of the Conception"), was equipped with thirteen pieces of artillery and other munitions.

Francisco de Novoa Feijóo, Capitán General of the Tierra Firme (Mainland) fleet, appointed de Canço captain of infantry of the fleet's flagship. De Canço proved his worth as a sailor and a soldier on the passage. On August 22 of that year, he spied a French vessel and captured it. The next day, at least according to his own writings, he saved the gold, silver, and pearls from a ship of the fleet sinking in a storm. Francisco de Noboa subsequently appointed him an admiral of the fleet on its passage from Isla Terceras in the Azores to Spain.

In the following years de Canço worked as captain of his own ships under orders of Alonso de Bazán, Francisco Osorio and Pardo Coloma, on assignments in Spain and America. He served under the command of Alonso de Bazán, being commissioned three times to make levies for seamen to man the ships of the Spanish Royal Navy in Galicia and Asturias. In 1592, for his accomplishments as a mariner and his services to the Crown, King Charles I made him a capitán de mar y guerra with an annual salary of thirty thousand maravedís. On August 19, 1595, Philip II dispatched him as an admiral of the fleet commanded by Pedro Tello.

== Defeat of Sir Francis Drake ==
The Indies fleet, commanded by General Sancho Pardo Osorio and escorted by Francisco Coloma's armada, left Havana for Seville on March 10, 1595, its ships loaded with gold and silver. While crossing the Bahama Channel, the fleet was surprised by a storm that forced the crippled vessels to anchor in Puerto Rico. Even though the flagship, which carried three hundred men and two million ducados in gold and silver, was left with no mainmast, had a broken tiller, and was taking on water, Pardo made it back to Havana. All the treasure was unloaded and placed in the Morro fortress, while a boat was sent to Spain with the news. Philip II immediately ordered General Tello and de Canço to go with five frigates to pick up the treasure. It was feared that the news would reach the English and tempt them to assault Puerto Rico, as subsequently happened.

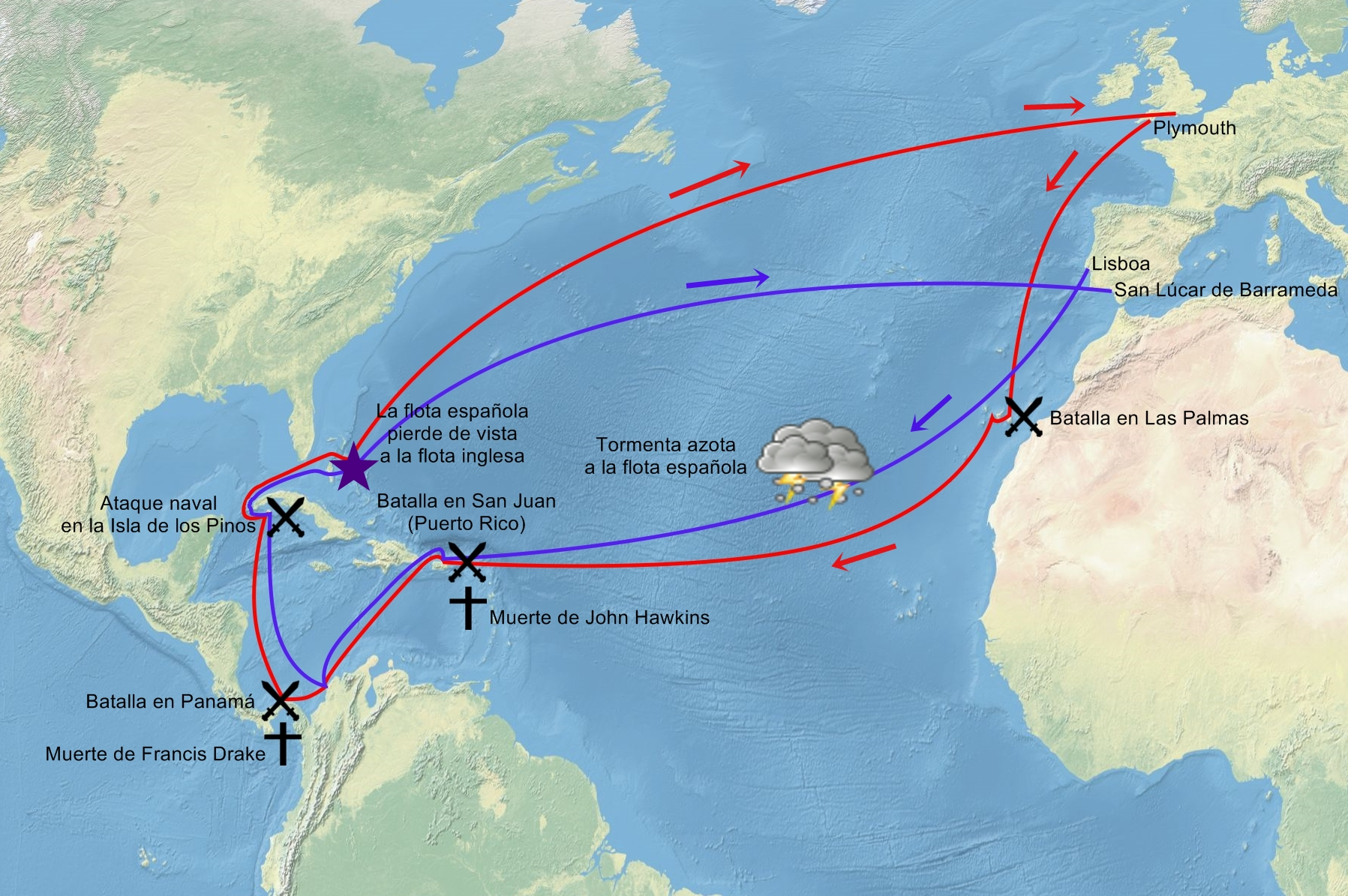
Expedition of Drake and Hawkins, 1595–1596

Shortly before reaching the islands of Guadeloupe and Dominica on November 8, the fleet came upon two English ships that fled when they spied the Spanish. While Admiral Guzman was chasing one of them, Admiral Alonso pursued the other ship, Francis. After several exchanges of cannon fire, de Canço attacked the enemy ship and captured all 26 sailors aboard. Sailing orders found aboard it revealed that the fleet of 27 ships with 2,500 men aboard, and commanded by John Hawkins and Francis Drake, was sitting in Guadeloupe, preparing its landing boats for an assault on the island of Puerto Rico and its treasure. Alarmed by this revelation, de Canço fired four cannon shots to alert one of his boats, which was in pursuit of another English ship, to go as soon as possible to warn Puerto Rico of the danger.

Wasting no time, the governor organized the defense of the island, although he had only 400 regular soldiers, 300 seamen on Sancho Pardo's flagship and 500 with de Canço and Guzman, as well as 300 militiamen from the city. These forces were divided and placed at the most strategic points. De Canço was responsible for the El Morro, Santa Elena and Morrill forts, while General Pardo scuttled the damaged galleon at the entrance to the harbor and blocked the channel.

On November 22, the English fleet appeared off Point Escambrón where de Canço was at the forefront of the Morrillo artillery. One cannon shot was aimed accurately enough to break the mizzenmast of Defiance, Drake's flagship, and another of the 28 cannonballs fired by the Spanish gunners crashed into Drake's cabin, splintering the stool he sat on at supper and killing Sir Nicholas Clifford and a young officer.

Francis Drake was now the sole head of the English fleet, and ordered his ships to take shelter near Isla de Cabras to avoid the Spanish bombardment. His men spent much of the next day sounding the waters to find suitable places to land. Their inability to force the blocked harbor and attack San Juan prompted Drake to send 30 boats with 1,500 men that night. Their goal was to burn the five Spanish frigates lying in the harbor, and they set fire to three of them. Two of the fires were quickly extinguished by their crews, but the third frigate was burned, illuminating the four sides of the harbor.

De Canço set his plan into motion and shelled the British barges incessantly, first from the Morro, and then from the Santa Elena battery, blowing up several of them. The frigates with their guns and the soldiers with their muskets contributed equally in the battle; that night nine barges were sunk and 400 Englishmen died. The Spanish suffered the deaths of some 40 men, the seizure of three as prisoners, and the loss of the frigate Magdalena. Seeing that he could not take the island, Drake the next day ordered his ships to hoist their sails, and they left the waters of Puerto Rico, but de Canço still managed to sink four other ships.

For the Spanish it was a victory over the English, whom they regarded as pirates rather than lawful privateers. For Francis Drake it was a humiliating defeat. In his long naval career as a commander of English fleets, he was defeated only twice, both times when he tried to attack Spanish cities located in the Caribbean. Now that there was no threat of attack, Guzman and de Canço sailed on December 20 with the four frigates, the surviving crewmen, and the two million ducats in gold and silver, and after crossing the Atlantic without incident landed safely in Spain.

== Governor of La Florida ==
On March 22, 1596 (or June 2, 1597, according to some sources) Philip II appointed de Canço the seventh governor of La Florida, opening a new stage in his career. Accompanied by his wife, Magdalena de Luazes Lugo, and his son Antonio, de Canço moved in May 1597 to his new post, arriving at St. Augustine (Spanish: San Agustín), capital of the province, on June 2. He did not like St. Augustine's location on very low-lying land surrounded by marshlands, with sandy soil that was barren and unproductive, making it difficult to develop agriculture and trade.

De Canço, regarded as a person of strong character and ambitious projects, thought it prudent to establish another settlement where the land was more suitable for farming to supply St. Augustine with foodstuffs. He gathered from the information he received that the best place to start a new colony was Tama, a region located on the banks of the confluence of the Altamaha and Ocumulgee rivers in what is now the state of Georgia. He believed he could establish a colony in Tama with three hundred married soldiers, and use it as a base to send exploratory expeditions in search of a coveted trail to the ports of Mexico in New Spain. To gather firsthand intelligence on the region he commissioned a soldier and two monks to visit Tama. Upon their return they notified him that the area was very fertile with productive forests and gold and silver mines.

While de Canço was making plans for the colonization of Tama, a Native American chief named Juanillo led an uprising against the Spanish in September 1597. Some chiefs of the tribe, whose vast territory stretched from the Altamaha River (Georgia) to Port Royal (South Carolina), were concerned about the spread of Christianity. Their grievances under the administration of governor de Canço included the Franciscan missionaries forbidding the Indian practices of polygamy, divorce, dancing, games and intertribal wars. These proscriptions weakened his people, according to Juanillo, causing them to lose their old courage and prowess. Juanillo's hatred of the Spanish missionaries was so intense that on the morning of September 13, 1597, his warriors killed the Franciscan Friar Corpa at Tolomato. The next day an assembly of allied Indian leaders gathered; they were also indignant at the loss of their peoples' lands and their freedom to the Spanish. Most of the missions in Guale were attacked and five Franciscans were killed as the rebellion spread.

News of the rebellion reached St. Augustine in early October. De Canço, who was sick in bed, got up and organized a relief expedition that he led himself. The Indians in Guale were burning churches and maiming and killing missionaries. Unable to catch the Indian rebels, de Canço had to content himself with burning their villages and destroying their crops. He took one prisoner who told him about the death of the friar.

In May 1598, de Canço rescued the only missionary survivor of the Juanillo massacre, Friar Francisco Dávila, who had been enslaved by the Indians in the town of Tulufina, not far from Tolomato. De Canço's troops suppressed the rebellion, which ended decisively when an expedition of Indian allies of the Spanish, led by the mico (chief) of Asao, attacked Juanillo's stronghold in the stockaded town of Yfusinique, killing him with 24 of his main supporters. Their deaths brought a temporary peace to Florida.

In May 1600 a delegation of Guale chiefs went to St. Augustine to swear obedience to King Philip III in the presence of Governor Canço. He accepted their submission on certain conditions, above all that they must suppress any uprisings against the Spanish (others sources, however, indicate that the rebellion was actually suppressed by his successor, Pedro de Ibarra, who treated the indigenous peoples with kindness; his approach was successful in brokering the peace essential to the colony's development). In 1603 de Canço visited the Guale territory to assess the loyalty of the Indians and to receive new oaths of allegiance from them.

During his tenure, de Canço made four trips exploring the territory and subjugating the chiefs of the provinces of Potano, Timuena, Apalachee, Cicale, and the Mosquitos, as well as the chiefs of Yufera and Oconah, whose territories bordered the Tama region. De Canço was able to persuade the chief of Santa Elena in South Carolina to return and submit himself to the Spanish.

On the other hand, de Canço promoted the intensive cultivation of corn, providing tools and seeds to settlers and Indians and building a mill to grind the grain, as well as fostering the establishment of farms and plantations. When the hospital built by order of former governor Pedro Menendez de Avilés was destroyed by fire in St. Augustine, he built and equipped at his own expense a hospital in honor of Santa Barbara. De Canço assigned a slave in service of the Spanish crown the task of keeping the hospital and its patients clean. Patient care was provided by elderly soldiers, convicts sent to St. Augustine to serve their sentences, and female slaves. He also ordered construction of a large church at the mission of San Pedro de Mocama so that the Christianized Indians could attend mass.

In February 1603 (or 20 Oct 1603), Philip III appointed a new governor of Florida, Pedro de Ibarra, a development that prevented Canço from implementing his ambitious projects in Tama. De Canço then returned to his homeland, bringing with him two packages of maize seeds that provided a major boost to the cultivation of the grain in Asturias. He spent the rest of his life at Tapia de Casariego, where he served as mayor of Castropol and Captain of the local militia. He died on March 31, 1622, in his birthplace.

== Personal life ==
Méndez de Canço married Magdalena Estoa y Luaces, and they had at least two children: a son, Diego de Canço y Donlebún, who became Alcalde mayor (Mayor) of Castropol, Asturias, and married María de la Vega Trelles y Beldedo; and a daughter, María de Canço y Luaces, who married an Asturian, Domingo Fuertes de Sierra.

== See also ==
- Battle of the Guadalupe Island (1595)
