= St. Catherines Island =

- St. Catherine's Island
- U.S. National Register of Historic Places
- U.S. National Historic Landmark District
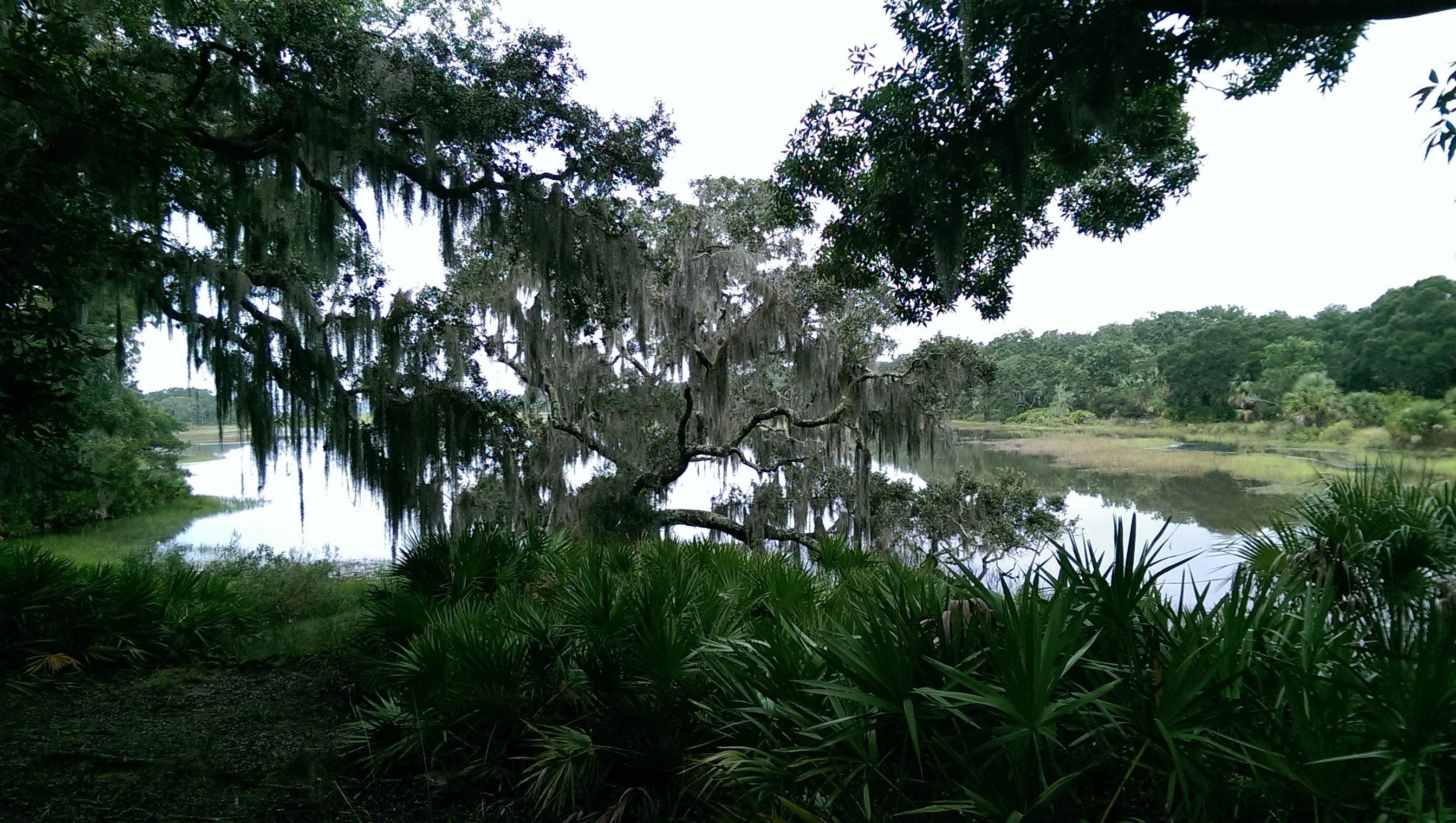
- Salt marsh on the island

- Location within Georgia Location within the United States
- Nearest city: South Newport, Georgia
- Coordinates: 31°37′50″N 81°9′36.5″W
- Area: 22,265 acres (90.10 km^{2})
- Built: 1566
- Architect: Multiple
- NRHP reference No.: 69000332

Significant dates
- Added to NRHP: December 16, 1969
- Designated NHLD: December 16, 1969

St. Catherines Island is a sea island on the coast of the U.S. state of Georgia, 42 miles (68 km) south of Savannah in Liberty County. The island, located between St. Catherine's Sound and Sapelo Sound, is ten miles (16 km) long and from one to three miles (4.8 km) wide. It covers approximately 22,265 acres, with about half of the acreage being salt marsh, while the remaining acreage is wooded. There are fine beaches on the northeast and south sides. The island is owned by the Saint Catherines Island Foundation and is not open to the public, apart from the beach below the mean high water line.

== Physical geography ==
Although often called a barrier island, St. Catherines Island is one of the sea islands found along the Atlantic coast of the southeastern United States between the mouth of the Santee River in South Carolina and the mouth of the St. Johns River in northeastern Florida. While barrier islands typically are long ridges of sand constantly shifting under the influence of sea level, sand supply, wave energy, and storms, the sea islands have a more complex structure, including an older, Pleistocene age component facing the mainland, and a newer, Holocene age component on the seaward side. The older portions of the sea islands were islands when sea levels were high during the Pleistocene, and then became ridges on the mainland as sea levels fell during the Wisconsin glaciation. With the return of high sea levels a few thousand years ago, the ridges once again became islands and new barrier beaches accumulated on the seaward side of the old islands to form the current sea islands. As sea levels approached current levels, extensive marshes formed to the west of the islands some time between 3700 and 2100 BC.

The sea level rise among the sea islands was not smooth. The rise was rapid until about 7,000 years BP. It continued to rise more slowly, reaching about three m below present sea level around 5,300 BP. A two m rise in sea level occurred between then and 4,300 years BP. This was followed by a rapid drop in sea level of two m in the next 700 years. In the last 3,600 years the sea has risen slowly to its present level.

Sanger and Thomas suggest that a smaller island on the seaward side of St. Catherines existed for a while, protecting a tidal marsh on the eastern side of St. Catherines, of which a remnant, the McQueen marsh, still exists. The Pleistocene core of the island is surrounded by scarps. A central depression runs down the long axis of the Pleistocene core. Holocene deposits are located primarily on the east side and to the south of the Pleistocene core. Salt marshes largely fill the space between the island and the mainland. The Pleistocene portion of the island was originally covered by a maritime forest, which produces an abundant mast (primarily acorns and other tree nuts). Both resource areas would support hunter-gatherers. There are many artesian springs on the Pleistocene core of the island, and the soils have supported Maize agriculture.

== Shell rings ==
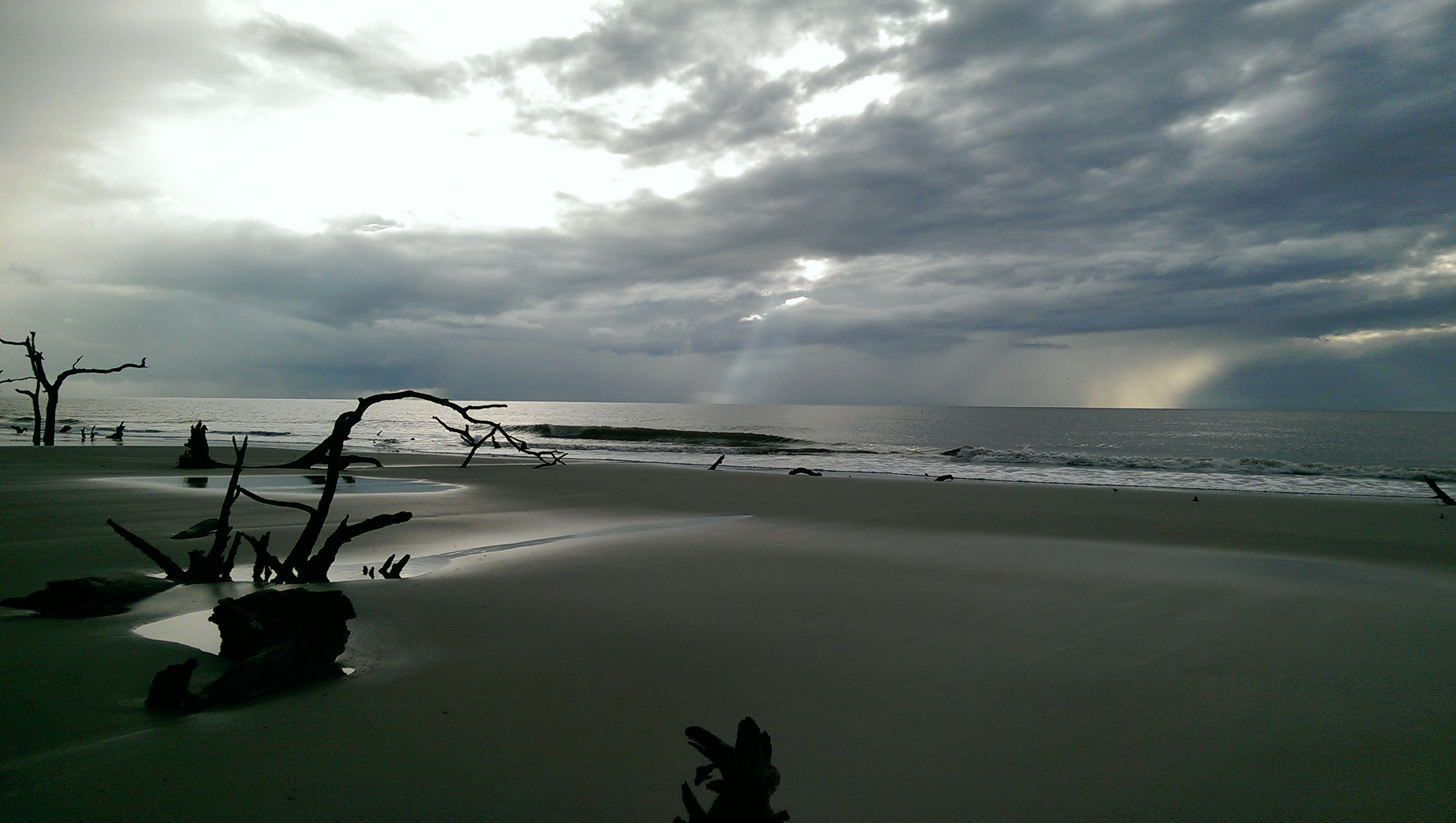
A beach on the island

Two Late Archaic period shell rings, the St. Catherines Shell Ring (previously known as the Long Field Crescent) and the McQueen Shell Ring, are located on St. Catherines Island. The St. Catherines Shell Ring is on the west side of the island, while the McQueen Shell Ring is on the east side, 2.3 km away. Both rings are on scarp margins of the Pleistocene core of the island. They are in the maritime forest, next to freshwater creeks, and both have easy access to saltwater creeks. The rings were constructed concurrently and completed around 2000 BC, with work on the McQueen ring possibly lasting about 50 years longer than on the St. Catherines ring. The rings are almost identical in structure. However, there are significant differences in the artifacts associated with the two rings.

=== St. Catherines Shell Ring ===
The Long Field Crescent (9LI231) was identified as a shell ring in 1979 and renamed the St. Catherines Shell Ring in 2006. The unmodified part of the ring is crescent-shaped, and up to 1.5 m high. St. Simons pottery sherds were found in the shell ring. Radio-carbon testing of material from the ring yielded median dates of 4,370 and 3,860 years Before Present (BP). The ring was used for many years, perhaps year-round. It was one of the features that contributed to St. Catherines Island being designated a National Historic Landmark. Excavations of the ring have found that it was originally round, about 70 m in diameter. The southern two-thirds of the ring was subject to extensive plowing in the first half of the 19th century, obscuring its surface appearance. The ring is only 25 cm high where it has been plowed. A ditch that marked the boundary of the Long Field separates the plowed and undisturbed portions of the ring.

The St. Catherines shell ring appears to have been constructed in two stages. A ring of shallow shell filled pits were found under the shell ring, but not in the central plaza or in the area surrounding the ring. Some of the pits showed evidence of burning. Many circular pits, up to more than one metre across, with straight sides and flat bottoms were found in the central plaza. The pits were filled with dark earth with little to no charcoal and no shells. Sanger and Thomas think the most likely origin of the holes was as postholes. Most of the dates from the pits under the shell ring lie in the range of 2540 to 2290 BC. The ring itself yielded radiocarbon dates in the range of 2260 to 1920 BC. Sanger and Thomas believe that the ring was constructed within a couple of centuries. Samples from the central plaza (charcoal and a hickory nut, as shells are absent) yielded a range from 2410 to 2210 BC.

Ceramic potsherds are common throughout the St. Catherines ring. More than 90 percent of the sherds are fiber-tempered ceramics classified as St. Simons. The remaining sherds of later types were found in upper layers or disturbed areas. Less than one percent of the St. Simons ceramics in the St. Caterines ring were decorated, primarily with simple marks. While stone tools are generally rare at archaeological sites in the sea islands and the adjacent coast, they are fairly common at the St. Catherines ring. Excavators have found 18 projectile points and a drill, as well as very small pieces interpreted as debris from tool reduction or reshaping. The majority of the points are identified as Savannah Stemmed. Most are also made from chert, likely from the Savannah River. More than 3,000 baked clay objects (distinct from pottery) have been found in the St. Catherines ring, as well as bone pins, shell tools, shell beads, and pearls.

=== McQueen Shell Ring ===
The McQueen Shell Ring (9LI648) was discovered in 2006. It is ring-shaped, almost exactly round, 70 m in diameter, with a 30 to 40 m diameter central plaza that is free of shell, and is 30 cm to one meter high. Several pits similar to those found in the St. Catherine ring were found in the central plaza of the McQueen ring. A burial pit containing human and non-human bone fragments was also found in the central plaza. Radio-carbon testing of shells in the ring yielded dates of 4270–3680 BP, while human bone fragments from the burial pit yielded dates of 4100–3980 BP. The dating of shells from one location on the ring indicates that the oldest shells, 2560 to 2190 BC, are at the top of the ring, and the youngest, 2120 to 1700 BC, are on the bottom. On the east side of the ring excavations revealed two layers of shell, separated by 3.5 cm of sand. Charcoal from the top of the upper layer was dated to 2280 to 1980 BC, while charcoal from the bottom of the upper layer was dated to 2200 to 1950 BC. A shell sample from the top of the lower layer was dated 2150 to 1870 BC. This apparent reversal of stratigraphic sequence has been found at other shell rings. A 3 m by 6 m mound of shells found buried in the central plaza was radiocarbon-dated to more than 2000 years after the ring was abandoned (AD 60–520 for the shells, and AD 1020–1190 for a piece of burnt wood on top of the shellheap).

As with the St. Catherines ring, ceramic potsherds are common throughout the McQueen ring, with more than 90 percent of the sherds being fiber-tempered St. Simons ware. Unlike with the St. Catherines ring, fourteen percent of ceramics in the McQueen ring were decorated with a variety of decorative marks. Stone tools have also been found at the McQueen ring, but a detailed analysis has not been published. In sharp contrast to the case at St. Catherines ring, only 15 baked clay objects have been found in the McQueen ring.

=== Relative dating ===
The two rings are very similar in size and construction. The dates for construction of the rings overlapped to a great extent. Construction of the St. Catherines ring began around 4800 BP, peaked in 4400 to 4200 BP, and ceased shortly after 3800 BP. Construction of the McQueen ring began around 4100 BP, peaked in 4200 to 3800 BP, and also ceased shortly after 3800 BP, although construction at the McQueen ring may have continued up to 50 years after it ceased at the St. Catherines ring.

== History ==
Archaeological investigations indicate that the island has been inhabited for at least 5,000 years. David Hurst Thomas states that the initial inhabitants settled first in the most productive areas of the Pleistocene core of the island. The population steadily increased until well after arrival of Europeans in the 16th century. While the increased population required more intensive exploitation of the resources of the island and surrounding waters, which would be expected to lead to overexploitation, Thomas observes that the white-tailed deer population remained viable on the island, with venison remaining an important part of the islanders' diet throughout. Fish and shellfish were also important components of their diet.

As of 2022, excavation of an approximately 4,000-year-old human grave site on St. Catherines Island is spearheaded by David Hurst Thomas and Matthew C. Sanger. Excavations at the grave site, which is surrounded by a large ring of seashells known as the McQueen shell ring, have uncovered copper objects closely corresponding to those found at hunter-gatherer sites in the Great Lakes region, suggesting that traders may have travelled all the way from the Midwest to St Catherines Island.

Thomas has directed systematic Spanish period mission excavations on St. Catherines Island for decades. These indicate that there were two stages of occupation (1587–1597, and 1604–ca. 1650) by Spanish missions on the island. They have revealed the remains of the churches, conventos (friars' quarters), a kitchen, wells, the churchyard, and part of the Indian settlement attached to the mission. Kathleen Deagan writes, "The work has provided detailed information about early Franciscan mission architecture and building construction, organization of space, diet, material culture, and economic strategies." A cemetery (campo santo) was found inside the remains of the church of Santa Catalina de Guale, where at least 431 persons were buried beneath the floor. It contained an assortment of associated grave goods, including crosses, Franciscan medallions, small medals, Jesuit finger rings, a cast figurine of the infant Jesus, and other religious and utilitarian objects.

There was a Guale settlement on St. Catherines Island by 1576, and it was established as the northernmost permanent Spanish outpost on the Atlantic Coast in 1587. Spanish colonies were planted as far north as Chesapeake Bay, but none lasted more than a year or two. During the 17th century, the mission of Santa Catalina de Guale, located on the island from 1602 to 1680, was the center of the Guale missionary province of Spanish Florida. When English raiders from Charles Town, Carolina, attacked the mission in 1680, Captain Francisco de Fuentes rallied his Spanish soldiers and Guale musketeers to defend the mission, but they were overwhelmed by the English.

Mary Musgrove, or Coosaponakeesa, daughter of a Muscogee woman and an Indian trader of English descent, obtained a grant for St. Catherines Island from the Spanish crown in 1759. In 1766 the island was leased by Button Gwinnett, a signer of the Declaration of Independence. It was run as a plantation for nearly a century, until the Civil War ended. During the Civil War, the island was granted to the Freedmen's Bureau by Sherman's Special Field Orders No. 15. On the island, the agent Tunis Campbell, dubbed "the most feared man in Georgia", established a government with schools. He also established a militia that worked to keep white people off the island. In the autumn of 1865, after the United States Congress repealed Sherman's Orders, African-American Union soldiers were sent to evict Campbell from his island, as he would not fire upon other blacks. Subsequently, Jacob Waldburg, following his pardon issued by President Andrew Johnson on 29 August 1865, reclaimed the island and plantation he owned prior to the civil war.

The 1893 Sea Islands Hurricane caused catastrophic destruction, sweeping seawater across the entire island. Only one person who remained on it during the storm survived, and all buildings were destroyed. In 1943, Edward John Noble bought the island, and used it to raise Angus cattle. In 1968, ten years after his death, the island was transferred to the Edward J. Noble Foundation. The island is now owned by the St. Catherines Island Foundation, and its interior is preserved for charitable, scientific, literary, and educational purposes. The foundation aims to promote conservation of natural resources, the survival of endangered species, and the preservation of historic sites, and to expand human knowledge in the fields of ecology, botany, zoology, natural history, archaeology, and other scientific and educational disciplines. Six ring-tailed lemurs were introduced on the island in 1985 as part of a captive breeding program by the New York Zoological Society (before it became the Wildlife Conservation Society); now there are dozens of this endangered species living there. They are habituated to humans and roam freely. St. Catherines Island was declared a National Historic Landmark and automatically placed on the National Register of Historic Places in 1969.

== See also ==
- Mary Musgrove
- Pedro Menéndez de Avilés
- List of National Historic Landmarks in Georgia (U.S. state)
- National Register of Historic Places listings in Liberty County, Georgia
