= Urriparacoxi =

Native American chief

- Reign: c. 1539 - unknown

Urriparacoxi, or Paracoxi, was the chief of a Native American group in central Florida at the time of Hernando de Soto's expedition through what is now the southeastern United States. "Urriparacoxi" was a title, meaning "war leader". There is no known name for the people he led, or for their territory.

== Encounter with de Soto ==
Hernando de Soto landed on the west coast of the peninsula of Florida in the summer of 1539 with a large contingent of men, with the intention of exploring and colonizing the country. The exact place at which de Soto landed has been controversial, but a number of historians accept Tampa Bay as the site.

Soon after landing de Soto encountered Juan Ortiz, a Spanish sailor who had been held captive by local chiefs for eleven years. Ortiz told de Soto of a chief called Urriparacoxi who lived inland, who had a lot of maize, and to whom the local chiefdoms, including Mocoso and Uzita, paid tribute. De Soto sent one of his lieutenants, Baltazar de Gallegos, with between 80 and 180 men (the chronicles of the expedition differ) to visit Urriparacoxi on June 20.

The people of Urriparacoxi's town abandoned it when the Spanish approached. The Spanish found fields of corn, beans and pumpkins at the town. Urriparacoxi refused to meet personally with de Gallegos, negotiating via messengers. He told de Gallegos that there was a large town, called Acuera, three days away, and another large town, Ocale, two more days beyond that. Urriparacoxi claimed that both towns had a lot of maize, and that Ocale kept turkeys in pens and herds of tame deer. He also told the Spanish that the people of Ocale had quantities of gold, silver and pearls.

De Soto left his base on the coast for Urriparacoxi's territory with the bulk of his army on July 15. Six days later he was joined by de Gallegos at a place called Luca (Milanich and Hudson tentatively place Luca near the present town of Lacoochee). From Luca de Soto's army proceeded to Ocale, and had no further contact with Urriparacoxi. Urriparacoxi disappears from the historical record after his encounter with de Soto's army.

== Location ==
The chronicles of the de Soto expedition variously place Urriparacoxi's town at 20, 25 or 30 leagues from the coast. Milanich and Hudson place Urriparacoxi's town about 25 leagues (66 miles (106 km)) northeast of eastern Tampa Bay, in southeastern Lake and southwestern Orange counties, near Lake Louisa, Lake Butler, Lake Tibet, and Big Sand Lake. Mounds near Lake Butler, some of which were excavated late in the 19th century, contained Spanish artifacts, at least some of which are compatible with the de Soto expedition. Urriparacoxi was the most powerful chief in the region. His territory might have reached as far west as Luca, but there is no evidence one way or the other, so de Soto and the bulk of his army may have never entered Urriparacoxi's territory.

== Title ==
"Urriparacoxi" was a Timucuan term for a war leader. "Paracousi" was Timucuan for "prince or war-prince", and "iri" (or "urri") was Timucuan for "war-counselor, war-prince, or warrior". While this may indicate that Urriparacoxi and his people spoke Timucuan, the title might have been borrowed by non-Timucuan speakers. Borrowing between different languages was common in the region. For example, the title "holata" for "chief" was used both in Timucua and in several Muskogean languages. Scholars have differed on the direction of borrowing. "Urri" or "iri", meaning "war" was borrowed by Muskogean languages from Timucua. Hann notes, however, that while "holata" was common in various languages in the southeastern United States, the use of "urriparacoxi" is otherwise unknown outside of Timucuan-speakers.

== Bibliography ==
- Hann, John H. (2003). Indians of Central and South Florida 1513-1763. Gainesville, Florida: University Press of Florida. ISBN 0-8130-2645-8.
- Milanich, Jerald T.; Hudson, Charles (1993). Hernando de Soto and the Indians of Florida. Gainesville, Florida: University Press of Florida. ISBN 0-8130-1170-1.
- Tebeau, Charlton W. (1980). A History of Florida (Revised ed.). Coral Gables, Florida: University of Miami Press. ISBN 0-87024-303-9.
