= Tocobaga =

Chiefdom in Northern America

Tocobaga chiefdom
Regions with significant populations
- Tampa Bay, Florida

Religion
- Native American

Related ethnic groups
- Mocoso, Pohoy, Uzita

Tocobaga (occasionally Tocopaca) was the name of a chiefdom of Native Americans, its chief, and its principal town during the 16th century. The chiefdom was centered around the northern end of Old Tampa Bay, the arm of Tampa Bay that extends between the present-day city of Tampa and northern Pinellas County. The exact location of the principal town is believed to be the archeological Safety Harbor site. This is the namesake for the Safety Harbor culture, of which the Tocobaga are the most well-known group.

The name "Tocobaga" is often applied to all of the native peoples of the immediate Tampa Bay area during the first Spanish colonial period (1513–1763). While they were culturally very similar, most of the villages on the eastern and southern shores of Tampa Bay were likely affiliated with other chiefdoms, such as the Pohoy, Uzita, and Mocoso. Study of archaeological artifacts has provided insight into the everyday life of the Safety Harbor culture.

Little is known about the political organization of the early peoples of the Tampa Bay area. The scant historical records come exclusively from the journals and other documents made by members of several Spanish expeditions that traversed the area in the 1500s.

The Tocobaga and their neighbors disappeared from the historical record by the early 1700s, as endemic diseases carried by European explorers decimated the local population. They had no medical acquired immunity to these new diseases. Survivors were displaced by the raids and incursions of other indigenous groups from the north. The Tampa Bay area was virtually uninhabited for over a century.

== Encounters with Spanish explorers in the sixteenth century ==
Estimated extent of Tocobaga influence at first contact with Spanish explorers

The Tampa Bay area was visited by Spanish explorers during Florida's early Spanish period. In 1528, an expedition led by Pánfilo de Narváez landed near Tampa Bay and soon skirmished with the indigenous population, probably at the principal town of the Tocobaga at the Safety Harbor site.

Several years later, the Hernando de Soto Expedition likely landed on the southern shore of Tampa Bay in 1539, (Note: The exact place(s) at which Narváez and de Soto landed is disputed. Bullen and Hann place Narvaez's landing on the south side of Tampa Bay, with a route north around the east side of the bay, well away from Tocobaga. Milanich suggests Narvaez landed on the Pinellas peninsula, and marched directly north through Tocobaga territory. The De Soto National Memorial marking de Soto's landing is on the south side of Tampa Bay. Bullen and Milanich argue that the descriptions of de Soto's initial travels fit that location better than proposed alternatives, such as Charlotte Harbor or the Caloosahatchee River. Hann simply says that the landing was on the south side of Tampa Bay. Neither expedition recorded the name Tocobaga.) and passed through the eastern part of Safety Harbor territory after occupying the village of Uzita.

Garcilaso de la Vega (known as el Inca), in his history of de Soto's expedition, relates that Narváez had ordered that the nose of the chief of Uzita be cut off, indicating that the two explorers had passed through the same area. Another town near Uzita encountered by de Soto was Mocoso, but evidence suggests that, while Mocoso was in the Safety Harbor culture area together with Uzita and Tocobaga, the Mocoso people spoke a different language, possibly Timucua. Neither Narvaez nor de Soto remained in the area for long, as they each traveled north in search of gold after several violent encounters with the Tocobaga and their neighbors.

The missionary expedition of Father Luis de Cancer visited the Tampa Bay area in 1549 to attempt to peacefully convert the locals to Christianity. He intended to build a relationship between the Spanish and indigenous Floridians in the aftermath of earlier visits by aggressive conquistadors. Despite being cautioned to avoid the Gulf Coast, Father Cancer's expedition came ashore just south of the mouth of Bahia Espiritu Santo (Tampa Bay) in May 1549. There they encountered apparently peaceful and receptive Natives who told them of the many populous villages around Tampa Bay. Father Cancer decided to continue north to visit these towns and was met with violent resistance. Most members of the expedition were killed or captured, and Father Cancer was clubbed to death soon after reaching modern day Pinellas County.

Hernando de Escalante Fontaneda, a shipwreck survivor who lived with the Natives of southern Florida from 1549–1566 and was rescued from the Calusa by Pedro Menéndez de Avilés, described Tocobaga, Abalachi (Apalachee) and Mogoso (Mocoço) as "separate kingdoms" from the Calusa. Ucita and Mocoço at the time of de Soto's visit were subject to a chief named Urriparacoxi or Paracoxi (also given as Urribarracuxi). (Note: "Paracoxi" ("Paracousi" in Laudonnière's account of the Saturiwa) meant "war chief" in the Timucuan language.) De Soto marched to the town of Paracoxi, which appears to have been inland from Tampa Bay, where he found maize being cultivated. (By contrast, the Safety Harbor people made little or no use of maize, and instead gathered most of their food and resources from the bountiful coastal waters.)

The name "Tocobaga" first appears in Spanish documents in 1567, when Pedro Menéndez de Avilés visited what was almost certainly the Safety Harbor site. Menéndez had contacted the Calusa and reached an accommodation with Carlos, the Calusa king. Menéndez married Carlos's sister.

As Carlos was anxious to gain an advantage over his enemy Tocobaga, Menéndez took Carlos and 20 of his warriors to Tocobaga by ship. Menéndez persuaded Tocobaga and Carlos to make peace. He recovered several Europeans and a dozen Calusa being held as slaves by Tocobaga. Leaving a garrison of 30 men at Tocobaga ( to encourage the people of the town to convert to Christianity), he returned Carlos and the other Calusa to their town. In January 1568, Spanish boats taking supplies to the garrison at Tocobaga found the town deserted, and all the Spanish soldiers dead.

== Later history ==
In 1608 an alliance of Pohoy and Tocobaga may have threatened Potano people who had converted to Christianity. In 1611 a raiding party from the two chiefdoms killed several Christianized Natives carrying supplies to the Spanish mission (Cofa) at the mouth of the Suwannee River. In 1612, the Spanish launched a punitive expedition down the Suwannee River and along the Gulf coast, attacking Tocobaga and Pohoy, and killing many of their people, including both chiefs. The Tocobaga were weakened by the Spanish attack, and the Pohoy became the dominant power in Tampa Bay for a while.

In 1677 a Spanish official inspecting the missions in Apalachee Province visited a village of Tocobaga people living on the Wacissa River one league from the mission of San Lorenzo de Ivitachuco. There is no record of when the Tocobaga settled on the Wacissa River, but they appear to have been there for a while. When the Spanish official criticized the Tocobaga for having lived in a Christian province "for many years" without having converted, they replied that no one had come to teach them about Christianity, but that some twenty of their people had converted on their death beds and been buried at the mission in Ivitachuco. The Tocobaga were engaged in transporting produce from Apalachee Province to St. Augustine, carrying it in canoes along the coast and up the Suwannee River and, probably, the Santa Fe River. Other people carried it overland the rest of the way to St. Augustine. The village was listed again in 1683, but it is not clear what happened when Apalachee Province was overrun by English Carolinian colonists and their Native allies in 1704. (Note: When the Spanish abandoned Apalachee province in 1704, some 800 surviving Indians, including Apalachee, Chatot and Yamasee, fled westward to Pensacola, along with many of the Spanish in the province. Some moved further west to French-controlled Mobile on the Gulf Coast. A few Apalachee from the Pensacola area returned to Apalachee province around 1718, settling near a fort that the Spanish had just built at San Marcos (St. Marks, Florida). Many Apalachee from the village of Ivitachuco moved to a site in Alachua County, and then to a location south of St. Augustine. Within a year most of them had been killed in raids. Some Tocobaga may have left with either group. In 1719, two Tocobaga men returned to San Marcos from Mobile, as they were unhappy with the treatment they had received from the French.) When the Spanish returned to San Marcos de Apalachee in 1718, they found a few Tocobaga living along the Wacissa River. The Spanish commander persuaded the Tocobaga to move to the mouth of the St. Marks River under the protection of a battery. In August that year 25 to 30 Pohoy attacked the Tocobaga settlement, killing eight and taking three away as captives. A small number of Tocobaga continued to live in the vicinity of San Marcos through the 1720s and 1730s.

The population of Tocobaga declined severely in the 17th century, due mostly to the spread of infectious diseases brought by the Europeans, to which the native people had little resistance, as they had no acquired immunity. In addition, all of the Florida tribes lost population due to the raids by the Creek and Yamasee around the end of the 17th century. Remnants of the Calusa, who lived to the south of the Tocobaga, were forced into extreme southern Florida. As Florida transitioned to British rule in 1763 following its defeat of France in the Seven Years' War, the Calusa emigrated with the evacuating Spanish, resettling with them in Cuba, possibly along with the remnants of the Tocobaga. In any case, the Tocobaga disappeared from historical records in the early 18th century.
