= Hutto/Martin Site =

Archaeological site in Florida, US

Coordinates: 29.0933°N 81.9020°W

The Hutto/Martin site is an archaeological site located in Marion County, Florida, located near the Ocklawaha River. Excavations at the site by Dr. Willet A. Boyer, III between 2006 and 2012 have led archaeologists to believe that it is the location of both a past Native American town and Spanish mission, associated with the Timucuan chiefdom of Acuera described in early contact and mission-era Spanish accounts from the sixteenth and seventeenth century.

== History ==
The earliest descriptions of the sixteenth-century chiefdom of Acuera, from the accounts of the Hernando de Soto entrada of 1539, describe the principal town of Acuera as being located within a day's travel of the town of Ocale on the northern side of the Withlacoochee River. As with all of the Timucuan tribes, the principal town was the political center of a chiefdom which controlled a larger territory with other settlements. In the case of the Acuera, their territory appears to have been what is today the Ocklawaha River Valley and the Ocala National Forest. The Acuera defeated and drove away the Spaniards from the de Soto expedition which attacked the chiefdom, one of the few Native American groups during the early part of the entrada to do so.

Later in the sixteenth century, after the establishment of St. Augustine in 1565, and the beginnings of Spanish missionization of the cultures of Florida, the female chief of the Acuera and a number of her principal leaders rendered obedience to the Spanish governor of Florida in 1597. By the 1620s, the mission of Santa Lucia de Acuera had been established in the principal town of the Acuera chiefdom, together with at least one other mission, San Luis, to the north. Mission Santa Lucia de Acuera was occupied from roughly 1627 to 1656. After the mission's establishment, the Acuera appear to have maintained much more of their cultural and religious traditions and beliefs than most of the other Native American chiefdoms missionized by the Spanish, and Santa Lucia de Acuera appears to have been a haven for fugitives from the Spanish labor draft as well as non-Catholic Native Americans from outside Florida. After the Timucuan Rebellion in 1656, the missions in Acuera territory were abandoned, though the Acuera appear to have maintained a relationship with the Spanish colonial government through at least the remainder of the seventeenth century.

== Archaeological Study of the Acuera Chiefdom and Discovery of the Hutto/Martin Site ==
Survey of the Ocklawaha River Valley during Boyer's initial fieldwork along the Ocklawaha River in 2006-2007 indicated that numerous sites associated with the later St. Johns archaeological culture appeared to date to the later precontact period, and were likely associated with the Acuera chiefdom. During the course of this fieldwork, one such site was located which had both Native American and colonial Spanish artifacts present, near the town of Moss Bluff. This site, recorded as the Hutto/Martin site (8MR3447), was considered the most likely candidate for the site of the principal town of the Acuera chiefdom and the site of Santa Lucia de Acuera. Subsequent excavations at the Hutto/Martin site between 2009 and 2010 uncovered mission-era Spanish structures as well as Native American residential structures, further suggesting it was the location of the Acuera chiefdom and Santa Lucia de Acuera mission.

The 2009-2010 excavations, while they provided evidence that the Hutto/Martin site was the site of Acuera, did not locate a mission church at the site. Accordingly, excavations were undertaken during the summer of 2012 in an area where Spanish structural materials, including forged nails, had been found during previous studies at the site.

=== Field methods and Findings ===
Shovel testing, metal detector testing, and water screening were used during these excavations. Metal detector testing was initially employed to determine the presence of any historic structures at the Hutto/Martin site. Afterwards, archaeologists used shovel testing in areas where artifacts were found in order to understand the boundaries of the site and denote if artifacts were positioned in situ. Other methods such as water screening were used to separate discovered materials from sediment for further analysis.

These excavations located a mission church structure, with burial pit features with associated human remains. Other artifacts recovered included Native American and Spanish artifacts dating to both the sixteenth and seventeenth centuries. Taken in conjunction with the previous archaeological discoveries at the site as well as the historical record of the Acuera chiefdom, the 2012 excavations at the site suggest that the Hutto/Martin site represents both the site of the seventeenth-century Santa Lucia de Acuera mission, and is almost certainly the location of the sixteenth-century town of Acuera as well.

== Analysis ==
Archaeologists held that the 2012 excavations support the idea of the Hutto/Martin site being the place of the Acuera town and Santa Lucia de Acuera mission. They pointed to features of the site such as its similar location and size, discovered mission structure, and large percentage of Spanish and Native American artifacts to advance this claim. They also brought attention to differences in ceramic styles found within the vicinity of the mission structure compared to the rest of the site. Throughout the rest of the site, St. Johns II style ceramics were found, which are associated with Native American assemblages. But in areas near the church, archaeologists uncovered Leon/Jefferson wares, which are tied to missionized Native American groups. Archaeologists proposed this may have suggested traces of people not from Acuera, or fugitives, whose past presence was known to have been within the town. Other aspects, such as the low burial population densities that were measured in association to the mission structure, were said to be indications of resistance to Catholic religion. This was also known of the Acuera people.

== Significance ==
Based on the archaeological evidence and 2012 excavations at the Hutto/Martin site, archaeologists determined that the site was indeed the location of the seventeenth-century Santa Lucia de Acuera Spanish mission and sixteenth-century Acuera town. Archaeologists also came to this conclusion by comparing records of Acuera, such as in the de Soto entrada. The Hutto/Martin site ultimately provides an understanding of the Native American cultures in this Florida region during the Spanish contact era. It also helps archaeologists further analyze interactions between the region's Native American groups and Spanish colonials.
