= Pohoy =

Chiefdom on Tampa Bay, Florida

Pohoy was a chiefdom on the shores of Tampa Bay in present-day Florida in the late sixteenth century and all of the seventeenth century. Following slave-taking raids by people from the Lower Towns of the Muscogee Confederacy (called Uchise by the Spanish and "Lower Creeks" by the English) at the beginning of the eighteenth century, the surviving Pohoy people lived in several locations in peninsular Florida. The Pohoy disappeared from historical accounts after 1739.

== Alternate names ==
The Spanish variously recorded the name of the chiefdom and people as Pohoy, Pojoy, Pojoi, Pooy, Posoy, and Pujoy. Jerald Milanich states that the name "Pohoy" is a form of Capaloey, the name of a chiefdom on Tampa Bay in the first half of the sixteenth century..

== Sixteenth century ==
Tampa Bay was the heart of the Safety Harbor culture area. People in the Safety Harbor culture lived in chiefdoms, consisting of a chief town and several outlying communities, controlling about 15 miles (24 km) of shoreline and extending 20 miles (32 km) or so inland. Ceremonial earthwork mounds were built in the chief towns. Chief towns were occasionally abandoned and new towns were built. There are fifteen or more Safety Harbor chief town sites known, most of which are located on a shoreline.

When the Spanish reached Tampa Bay early in the sixteenth century, they found four chiefdoms on the shores of the bay. The town of Tocobago was at the northern end of Old Tampa Bay (the northwest arm of Tampa Bay). Uzita controlled the south shore of Tampa Bay, from the Little Manatee River to Sarasota Bay. Mocoso was on the east side of Tampa Bay, on the Alafia River and, possibly, the Hillsborough River. Capaloey, was on Hillsborough Bay (the northeast arm of Tampa Bay), which may have included the Hillsborough River. Historian Jerald Milanich states that the name Pohoy is a form of Capaloey.

The de Soto expedition landed in Uzita territory in 1539. It passed through Mocoso territory, and further north along the Withlacoochee River. It noted the inland towns of Guacozo, Luca, Vicela, Tocaste, all of which may have been Safety Harbor culture settlements. The de Soto expedition is not known to have entered Capaloey territory. The Utiza and Mocoso chiefdoms disappeared within 35 years after the encounter with the de Soto expedition, and Tocobago dominated Tampa Bay when Pedro Menéndez de Avilés visited there in 1567.

== Seventeenth century ==
The name Pohoy first appears in historical accounts early in the seventeenth century. In 1608, an alliance of Pohoy and Tocobago may have threatened those Potano who had been converted to Christianity. In 1611 a raiding party from the two chiefdoms killed several Christianized Indians carrying supplies to the Spanish mission (Cofa) at the mouth of the Suwannee River. In 1612, the Spanish launched a punitive expedition down the Suwannee River and along the Gulf coast, attacking Tocobago and Pohoy; they killed many of the native people, including both chiefs.

The Spanish of that expedition referred to Tampa Bay as the "Bay of Espiritu Santo and Pojoy", Espiritu Santo being the name Hernando de Soto gave it in 1539. "Bay of Pohoy" or "Bay of Pooy" apparently was applied to the southern part of Tampa Bay. The Tocobago were weakened by the Spanish attack, and the Pohoy became the dominant power in Tampa Bay for a while.

By 1634 Pohoy was allied with or subject to the Calusa chiefdom. (That year the Spanish referred to the "province of Carlos, Posoy, and Matecumbe", i.e., Calusa, Pohoy, and the Florida Keys.) Pohoy and Calusa were described as hostile to the Spanish in 1675. At that time the town of Pohoy was said to be on a river six leagues from Tocobago, perhaps on the Hillsborough River or Alafia River.

A Spanish expedition down the coast from the mouth of the Suwannee River in 1680 sought to reach the Calusa domain. The Spanish were warned by the Pohoy chief to turn back. Due to increasingly strident warnings in the next few villages on the way to Calusa, the Spanish did retreat. This expedition described the Pohoy, but not the Calusa, as "docile". A Spanish expedition in 1699 that traveled overland from San Francisco de Potano (near present-day Gainesville) found the Tampa Bay area to be largely deserted. While the Spanish were told that there were many people in villages in the area, they did not see them. The expedition's report mentioned Pohoy several times, but the Spanish apparently did not visit the town.

== Alafay people ==
The Alafay people (also known as Alafaes, Alafaia, and Elafay) were associated with the Pohoy, probably as a sub-group. In the seventeenth century Pohoy territory included the area along the Alafia River. The Spanish expedition of 1680 reported that Elafay was the next town beyond Pohoy, with 300 people in Pohoy, and 40 in Elafay. The 1699 Spanish expedition reported having passed through an abandoned village named Elafay near Tampa Bay. In 1734 Don Antonio Pojoi was identified as the leader of the Alafaias Costas nation.

== Eighteenth century ==
Early in the eighteenth century, Pohoy and Tocobago Indians were living together in a village near the Spanish colonial town of St. Augustine. Alafae people were also recorded as living with other refugee groups here by 1717. Between 1718 and 1723, 162 Alafae were baptized there. In 1718 Pohoy people attacked a village of Tocobago at the mouth of the Wacissa River in the Province of Apalachee. In the 1720s and 1730s, Pojoy Indians were living together with Jororo, Amacapira (possibly related to the Pohoy) and later, Alafae people, in villages south of St. Augustine.

Many Native American people were reported to have died in an epidemic in 1727, with the survivors leaving the area. A new village of Pohoy, Alfaya and Amacapira, and a neighboring village of Jororo, had been established by 1731. Most of the Pohoy, Alafae, Amacapira, and Jororo Indians moved away again in 1734, in response to an attempt by the new governor of Florida to re-settle Indians in villages closer to St. Augustine and extract unpaid labor from them.

By the early eighteenth century, all of the indigenous groups in peninsular Florida were working with and looking to the Spanish authorities for protection from Uchise raiders. (The Uchise were the Muscogee people known as "Lower Creeks" by the British colonists.) The Spanish hoped that the Indians would help protect St. Augustine and Florida from encroachment by British colonists in the Southern Colonies.

Warfare broke out in 1738 among several of the native groups. In the 1730s the Pohoy held a number of Jororo slaves, and were being paid tribute by the Bomto or Bonito, who had ties to the Mayaca and Jororo. In 1739 the Bomto attacked a camp of the Pohoy and Amacapira, killing more than 20 people. Only one Pohoy man escaped. The Bomto spared the Jororo slaves in the camp.

The Pohoy were still allies or subjects of the Calusa, and the Calusa retaliated for the attack on the Pohoy by attacking the Bomto-allied Mayaca people living near Lake Okeechobee. The Spanish received reports that more than 300 people died in that battle. Surviving Pohoy ambushed a Bomto party headed to St. Augustine, killing several. Several of those Pohoy were in turn killed or carried off by Uchise warriors. The Pohoy and Amacapira (and the Bomto) disappeared from history after that.

== See also ==
- List of sites and peoples visited by the Hernando de Soto Expedition
