= Theodoros Griego =

16th-century Greek seafarer

- Θεόδωρος Γκριέγκο
- Born: unknown Aegean Sea, Ottoman Empire (present-day Greece)
- Died: unknown
- Other names: Dorotheos Theodoros; Don Theodoros; "a Greek Christian"
- Occupations: Mariner, explorer
- Known for: Considered the first Greek to reach lands of the modern United States
- Notable work: Participant in the Narváez expedition (1527–1528)

Theodoros Griego (Greek: Θεόδωρος ο Έλληνας) was a Greek seafarer from an Aegean island and an explorer of the Americas. He is considered the first Greek person to ever set foot in America, on April 14, 1528.

He appears in the campaign account authored by Álvar Núñez Cabeza de Vaca. His original name is said to have been Dorotheos Theodoros (Δωρόθεος Θεόδωρος). He is also referred to as “Don Theodore” or simply “a Greek Christian” in de Vaca's book, published in 1542 and revised in 1555.

During his journey, Theodoros reportedly traveled across parts of what are now the Southern United States, participating in early explorations that provided important, albeit limited, information about the region's geography, indigenous peoples, and natural resources. His presence in the expedition highlights the diverse backgrounds of the explorers who took part in the early European ventures into the Americas.

Although little is known about his personal life before or after the expedition, Theodoros’ mention in de Vaca's account has ensured that his role in history, especially as a pioneering Greek figure in American exploration, is recognized by historians and researchers interested in the contributions of non-Spanish participants in early 16th-century expeditions.

== Sources ==
- Jurgens, Jane (1999). "Greek Americans". In Jeffrey Lehman (ed.). Gale Encyclopedia of Multicultural America (2nd ed.). Detroit: Gale Group. ISBN 0-7876-3986-9.
