= Jungle Prada Site =

- U.S. National Register of Historic Places
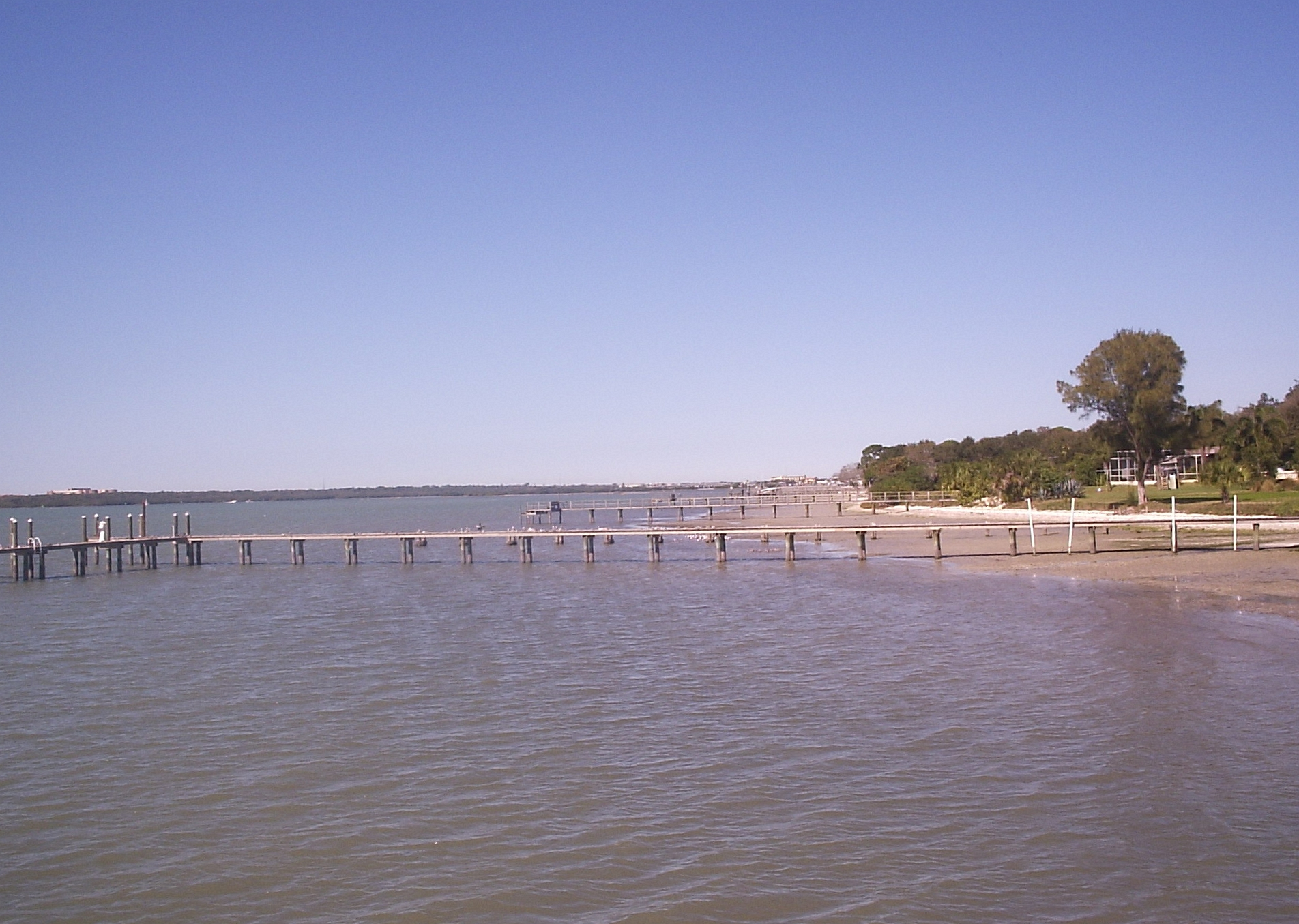
- Looking north from the fishing pier at Jungle Prada de Narvaez Park

- Location within Florida Location within the United States
- Location: St. Petersburg, Florida
- Coordinates: 27°47′19″N 82°45′08″W
- NRHP reference No.: 03000007
- Added to NRHP: February 4, 2003

The Jungle Prada Site (also known as Jungle Mound or Anderson-Narváez Site) is an archaeological site featuring Indigenous Tocobaga mounds and the location of the historical Narváez expedition landing. The Jungle Prada site spans public and private property, including the Jungle Prada de Narvaez city park, in St. Petersburg of Pinellas County, western coastal Florida, in the Southern United States.

The Jungle Prada Site was added, on February 4, 2003, to the National Register of Historic Places.

== History ==
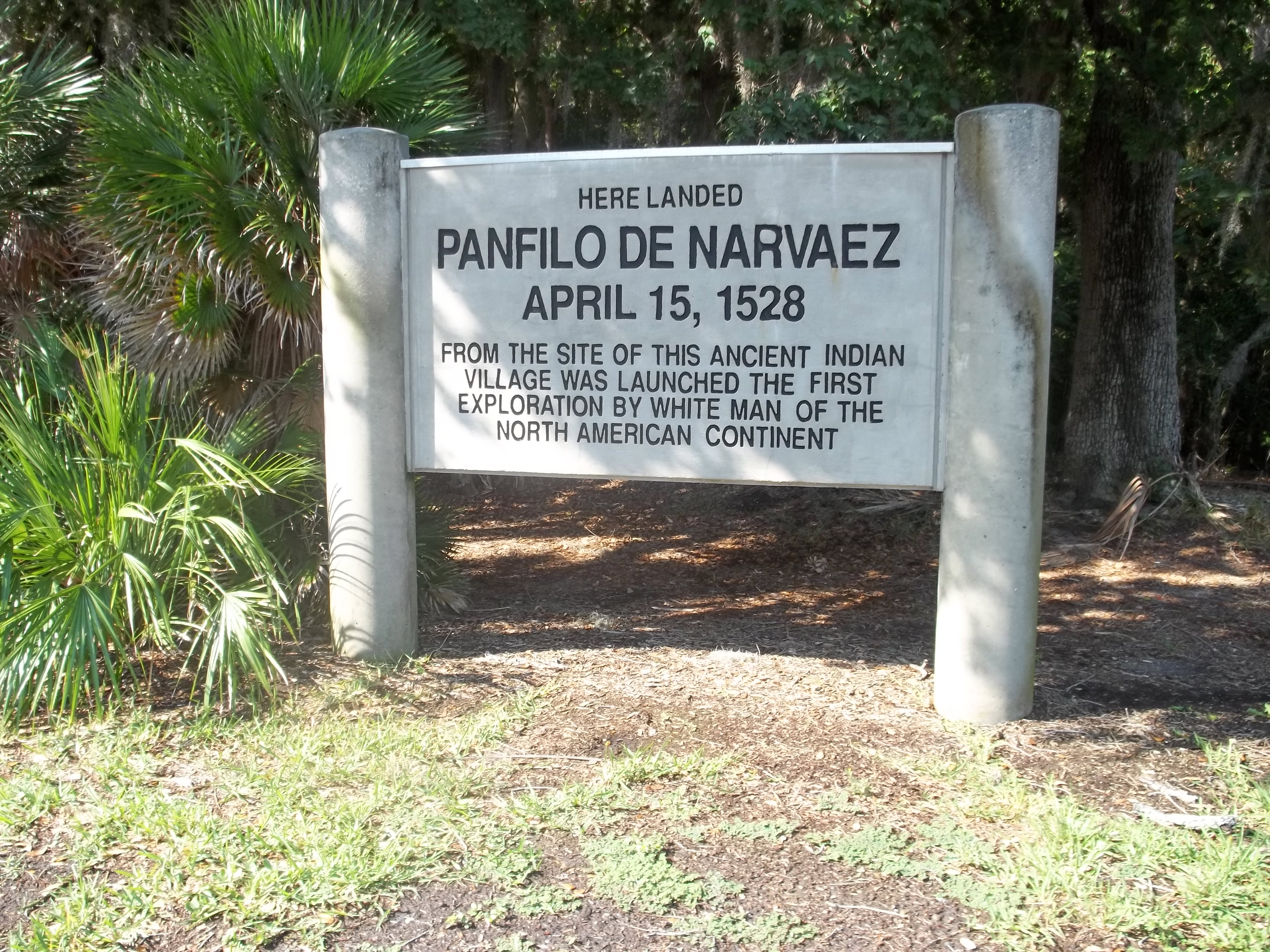
Narvaez marker in Jungle Prada Park

The Tocobaga tribe inhabited the Jungle Prada site for approximately 600 years, from 1000 to 1600 CE. Their village complex in the area once contained a series of mounds stretching up and down Boca Ciega Bay for more than three miles (4.8 km); however most of the mounds were dismantled and used as fill for 20th century urban development. The Jungle Prada site mounds that remain include a twelve-foot (three-point-seven-metre) tall plaza mound (likely used for ceremonial purposes) and a 23-foot (7.0 m) tall, 900-foot (270 m) long, 300-foot (91 m) midden mound, that stretches from the Jungle Prada de Narvaez public city park onto private property. The portion of the mounds that are on private property are considered "archeologically pristine."

The Diocese of St. Petersburg placed a marker at the Jungle Prada site, acknowledging it as the location of the first Catholic Mass in Florida.

== Location ==
The Jungle Prada site spans both public and private land. Portions of the Tocobaga mounds, as well as picnic tables, a fishing pier, and boat launch are located within the city park, and are maintained by the City of St. Petersburg. The better-preserved mounds, along with a small archeological museum, are located on private property and are accessible by guided tour. The Jungle Prada site is located on the eastern shore of Boca Ciega Bay, at Park Street North and Elbow Lane (17th Avenue) in St. Petersburg, Florida.

== See also ==
- Spanish colonization of the Americas
