= Juan Ortiz (captive) =

Spaniard held captive in Florida

Juan Ortiz was a Spanish sailor who was held captive and enslaved by Native Americans in Florida for eleven years, from 1528 until he was rescued by the Hernando de Soto expedition in 1539. Two accounts of Ortiz's eleven years as a captive, differing in details, offer a story of Ortiz being sentenced to death by a Native American chief two or three times, saved each time by the intervention of a daughter (and possibly other female relatives) of the chief, and finally escaping to a neighboring chiefdom, whose chief sheltered him. (Note: While all four of the accounts of the de Soto Expedition that have survived mention the rescue of Ortiz, only the accounts by the Gentleman of Elvas and by the Inca Garcilaso de la Vega provide any information about his captivity. The Gentleman of Elvas was a member of the de Soto Expedition, while the Inca wrote his account decades later, based on some now lost written accounts and on interviews with survivors of the expedition. Milanich and Hudson state that the Inca is unreliable on details of the expedition's itinerary, and note that some historians regard the Inca's account as "more a work of literature than a work of history". Hann warns that there are many errors in the account produced by the Inca.)

== Captivity ==
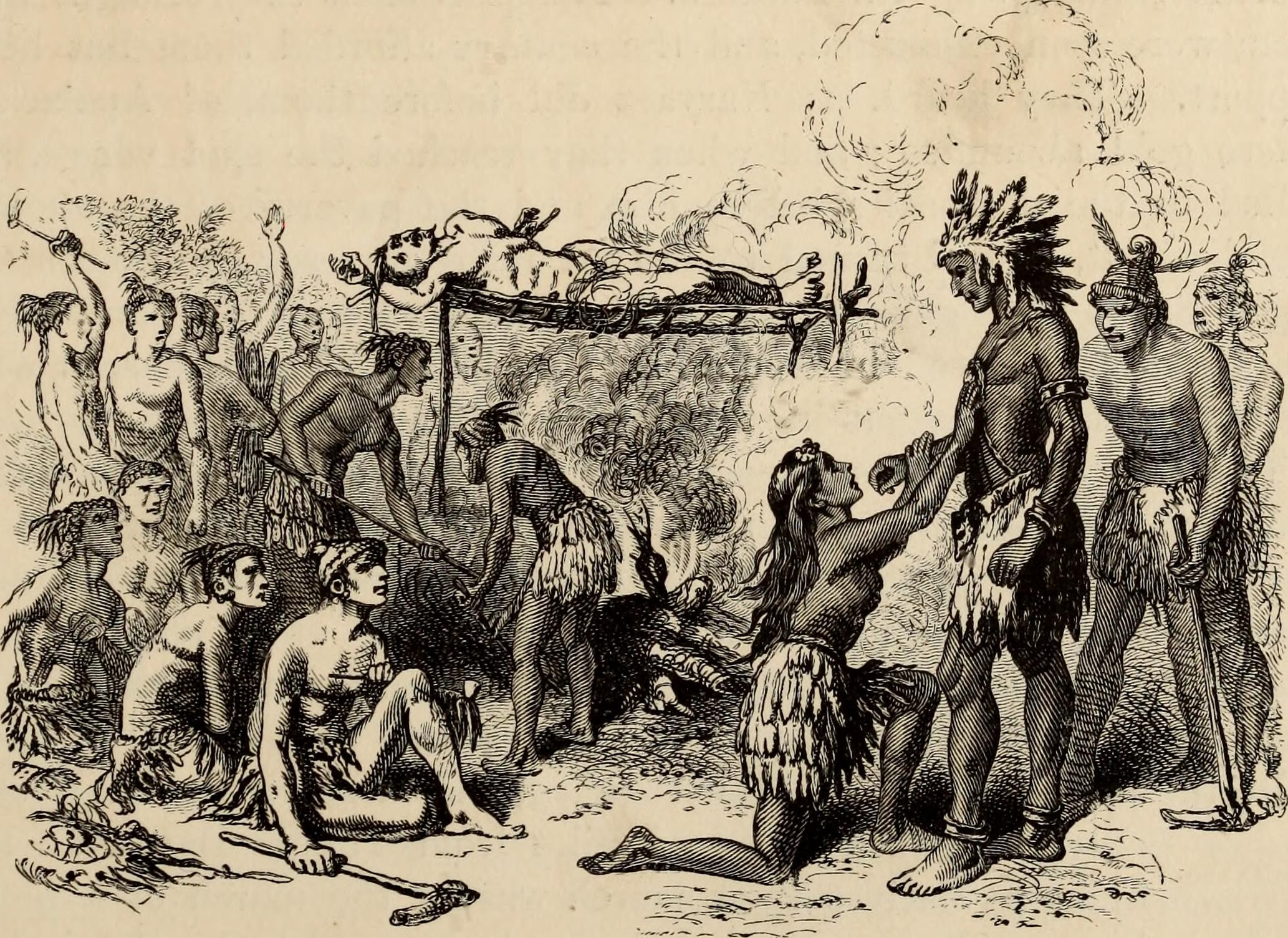
Juan Ortiz being sacrificed by burning, with the daughter of Chief Uzita pleading for his life

In 1528 Juan Ortiz was on a ship searching Tampa Bay for any sign of the Narváez expedition which had landed in Tampa Bay the year before. Ortiz and one or more companions were enticed on shore by some people who had what the Spanish thought was a message from Narváez. (The Spanish would not learn the fate of the Narváez expedition for another eight years, until Álvar Núñez Cabeza de Vaca and three other survivors reached a Spanish outpost in northwestern New Spain.) Ortiz and his companions were captured by the people on shore and abandoned by their shipmates. All but Ortiz were either killed while resisting capture or shortly after being taken to the town of Uzita (Note: The Gentleman of Elvas relates that a single companion of Ortiz was killed while fighting against their captors, while the Inca states that three companions were executed with arrows in the town plaza, and that Ortiz was saved from the same fate when the chief's wife and three daughters pleaded for his life. The chief and town are called Uzita by the Gentleman of Elvas and Hirrihiqua by the Inca. One of the other accounts of the expedition names the chiefdom of Orriygua as a neighbor of Uzita.). After Ortiz was taken to the town of Uzita (as told by the Gentleman of Elvas), or some time after Ortiz was spared from execution by being shot with arrows (per the Inca), the chief ordered Ortiz tied to a rack set over a fire. The chief's daughter (Note: The Inca says it was his wife and daughters.) begged the chief to spare Ortiz, arguing that Ortiz was not a danger to the chief.

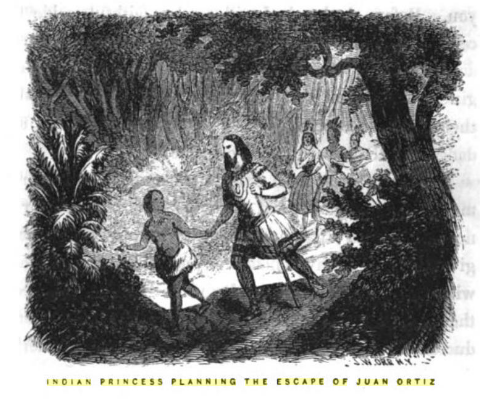
Chief Uzita's daughter helping Juan Ortiz to escape

After Ortiz's burns had been tended to, he was set to guard bodies placed in the charnel house of the town, to keep predators from taking the bodies away during the night. (Note: The chiefdoms of Tampa Bay, like many Native American groups, normally left bodies exposed in open sided structures until the flesh had decayed enough to be easily removed from the bones. The large bones were then bundled up and kept in a special structure or buried in a mound. Around Tampa Bay, the structures in which bodies were exposed were often on top of burial or temple mounds.) One night a wolf (Note: The Inca says it was a lion.) took the body of a young child that had recently died. Ortiz pursued the wolf in the night and killed it, recovering the child's body. The chief Uzita treated Ortiz better for a while after that.

Two or three years after Ortiz had been captured, the chiefdom of Mocoso attacked Uzita, burning the town. The town of Uzita was then moved to a new location, and the chiefdom's gods demanded that Ortiz be sacrificed. The daughter of Chief Uzita warned Ortiz that he was to be sacrificed and told him he should go to Mocoso, whose chief had asked for Ortiz to be given to him. The daughter led Ortiz out of the town at night, and showed him the path to Mocoso.

== Rescue and after ==
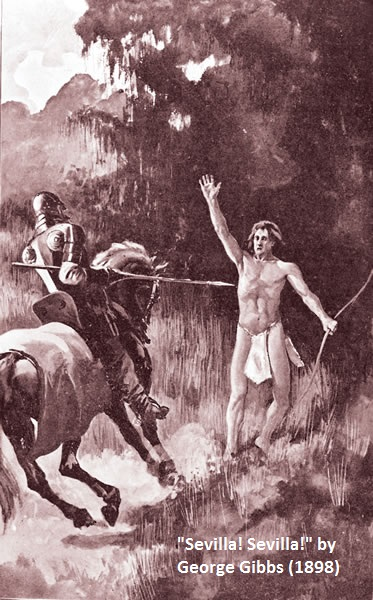
The discovery of Juan Ortiz by the de Soto Expedition

Juan Ortiz was found by the de Soto Expedition when they landed in Tampa Bay in 1539. After first landing at Uzita, de Soto and his men heard of a Christian living in a neighboring chiefdom. While searching for Ortiz, de Soto's men encountered ten or so Native Americans, and started to attack them. Ortiz was with the group being attacked, but he managed to make the Spanish understand that he was a Christian (one account says he did so by calling out "Sevilla", which was his home town). Ortiz then led the Spanish to the town of Mocoso, whose chief, also named Mocoso, had sheltered him for many years. Mocoso was friendly to de Soto, which created tension between Mocoso and other chiefdoms around Tampa Bay, including Orriygua, Neguarete, Capaloey and Uzita.

Ortiz could speak the languages of both Uzita and Mocoso (which were mutually unintelligible). The language of Mocoso was apparently a dialect of the Timucua language, which made Ortiz very useful to de Soto. As the expedition traveled up the Florida peninsula, it passed through chiefdoms that spoke various dialects of the Timucua language, until the expedition crossed the Aucilla River, and entered the Apalachee Province. From that point the expedition relied on Timucua speakers who could translate from other languages, with Ortiz then providing a translation into Spanish.

Juan Ortiz died sometime during the winter of 1541–1542, while the expedition was camped at the town of Autiamque in what is now Arkansas.

== Legend ==
The Inca's version of the story of Juan Ortiz and the daughter of Chief Hirrihigua has grown into a legend. The daughter of a chief has become "Princess Hirrihigua", and in some versions has acquired a name, "Uleleh". The Princess Hirrihigua Chapter of the Daughters of the American Revolution erected a marker in St. Petersburg, Florida, commemorating the story of Juan Ortiz and Princess Hirrihigua in 1960. A longer version of this legend, with the addition of the name "Uleleh", "The Story of Juan Ortiz and Uleleh", was published by a historical society in 1908. A children's book, Uleyli- The Princess & Pirate: Based on the true story of Florida's Pocahontas, was released in 2018 in both a black-and-white illustrated chapter book version and a full-color illustrated, abridged, junior graphic novel version. In these versions, the chief's daughter's name became "Princess Uleyli of Ucita in Hirrihigua Province" and the story is told from her perspective.

== John Smith and Pocahontas ==
Some scholars have speculated that John Smith's story of being saved from death at the hands of Powhatan by his daughter Pocahontas was inspired by the story of Juan Ortiz being saved by the daughter of Chief Uzita. Richard Hakluyt's translation into English of A Narrative of the Expedition of Ferdinand de Soto into Florida by the Gentleman of Elvas was published in London in 1609, several years before John Smith published his account of being saved by Pocahontas.
