= Uzita (Florida) =

Pre-Columbian settlement in Florida

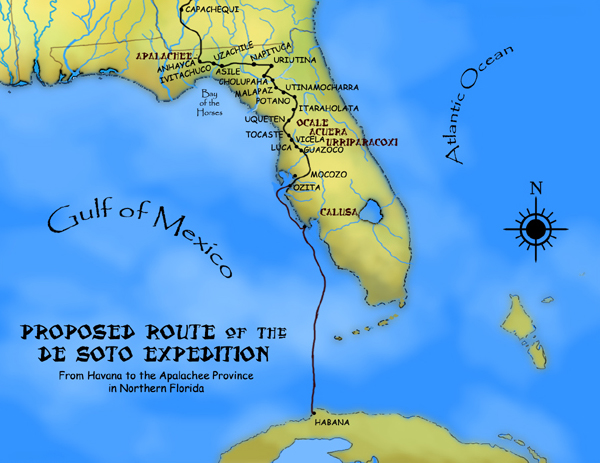
A proposed route for the first leg of the de Soto Expedition, based on Charles M. Hudson map of 1997

Uzita (Uçita) was the name of a 16th-century native chiefdom, its chief town and its chiefs. Part of the Safety Harbor culture, it was located in present-day Florida on the south side of Tampa Bay.

== History ==
The chief town was near the mouth of the Little Manatee River on the south side of Tampa Bay, Florida in the area of Hillsborough County that is now Ruskin, Florida. The territory of Uzita was said to extend from the Little Manatee River to Sarasota Bay. The Uzita people were part of the Safety Harbor culture.

The people of Uzita were the first inhabitants of Florida to be encountered by both the Narváez expedition in 1528 and the de Soto expedition in 1539. The town of Uzita was described as consisting of the chief's house on a mound, seven or eight other houses, and a "temple" (apparently a charnel house). The houses were made of wood and palm thatch, and probably housed a large number of people each. The Uzitans used bows and arrows. The Spanish described the bows as being very long. Some arrows were sharpened reeds that could pierce a shield, or splinter and penetrate chain mail, while others had fish bone or stone points. The Uzitans practiced human sacrifice.

Juan Ortiz, who had been sent on a small boat to search for the missing Narvaez expedition, was captured by the Uzitans. For several years the Uzitan set him to guard the bodies in the charnel house from wild animals at night. Utiza, the chief, planned to roast Ortíz over a grill, but the chief's daughter asked her father to spare him from sacrifice. When the chief later planned again to sacrifice Ortíz, the chief's daughter helped the Spaniard to escape to the neighboring chiefdom of Mocoso.

Uzita is not mentioned in Spanish records after the departure of the de Soto expedition. In the early 17th century the Spanish referred to the area where Uzita had been located as Pohoy.

== See also ==
- List of sites and peoples visited by the Hernando de Soto Expedition

== Sources cited ==
- Hann, John H. (2003). Indians of Central and South Florida - 1513-1763. Gainesville, Florida: University Press of Florida. ISBN 0-8130-2645-8.
- Milanich, Jerald T. (1995). Florida Indians and the Invasion from Europe. Gainesville, Florida. ISBN 0-8130-1636-3.
- Milanich, Jerald T.; Hudson, Charles (1993). Hernando de Soto and the Indians of Florida. Gainesville, Florida: University Press of Florida. ISBN 0-8130-1170-1.
