= Mocoso =

16th-century chiefdom in Florida

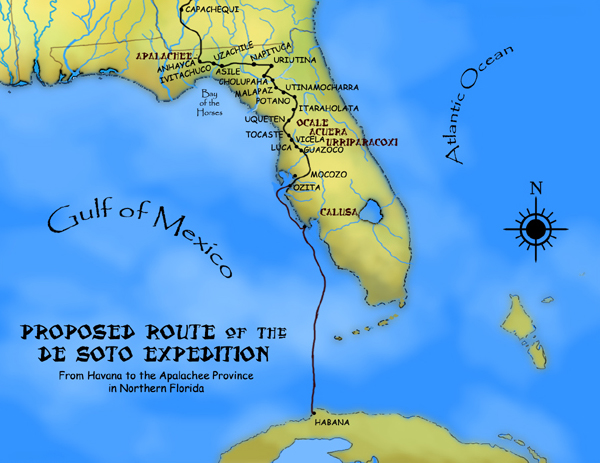
A proposed route for the first leg of the de Soto Expedition, based on Charles M. Hudson map of 1997

Mocoso (or Mocoço) was the name of a 16th-century chiefdom located on the east side of Tampa Bay, Florida near the mouth of the Alafia River, of its chief town and of its chief. Mocoso was also the name of a 17th-century village in the province of Acuera, a branch of the Timucua. The people of both villages are believed to have been speakers of the Timucua language.

The Mocoso of Tampa Bay lived in the area of the Safety Harbor culture. The Mocoso people were among the first inhabitants of Florida encountered by both the Narváez expedition in 1528 and the de Soto expedition in 1539. Hernando de Escalante Fontaneda, who was a captive of various tribes in Florida from about 1549 until about 1566, described Mocoso as a "kingdom by [it]self", i.e., not part of the Calusa domain. The de Soto expedition chroniclers recorded that Mocoso was subject to an inland chief named Paracoxi or Urriparacoxi, of a village of the same name. Paracoxi was a leadership title used some of the Eastern Timucua groups.

The de Soto expedition found Juan Ortíz, a Spaniard, living with the Mocoso. Ortiz had been captured by the Uzita while searching for the lost Narváez expedition, and had later escaped to Mocoso. Ortiz had learned the Timucua language and served de Soto as an interpreter as he traversed the Timucuan-speaking areas on his way to Apalachee.

The Mocoso painted their bodies red and wore plumes in their hair.

Hann argues that the Mocoso spoke a dialect of Timucua: the Mocoso spoke a different language than their neighbors at Uzita, Tocobago and Calusa. They tattooed their bodies, as did the Timucua, while there is no record of tattooing among other tribes around Tampa Bay. Juan Ortíz, who had lived with the Mocoso, spoke the Timucua language, and the Mocoso were subject to a chief with a Timucuan name.

The governor of Spanish Florida reported in 1614 that 300 Calusa war canoes attacked two towns in Mocoço Province near Tampa Bay, killing about 500 people, because the towns were Spanish allies. A village named Mocoso is recorded from the Acuera province in the 17th century. A native of that Mocoso, Diego Salvador, was a royal interpreter in Apalachee, speaking Spanish, Timucua and Apalachee; he served as a sergeant major in the Spanish Army. He may also have had close contacts with the Spanish governor of Florida. Hann suggests that the Mocoso on Tampa Bay had incurred the wrath of other tribes in the area by aiding the de Soto expedition and were forced to withdraw into the interior, ending up in Acuera. Hann also speculates that Diego Salvador's position may have been a reward for help that an ancestor had given de Soto.

== See also ==
- List of sites and peoples visited by the Hernando de Soto Expedition
