= Narváez expedition =

16th-century Spanish exploration in North America

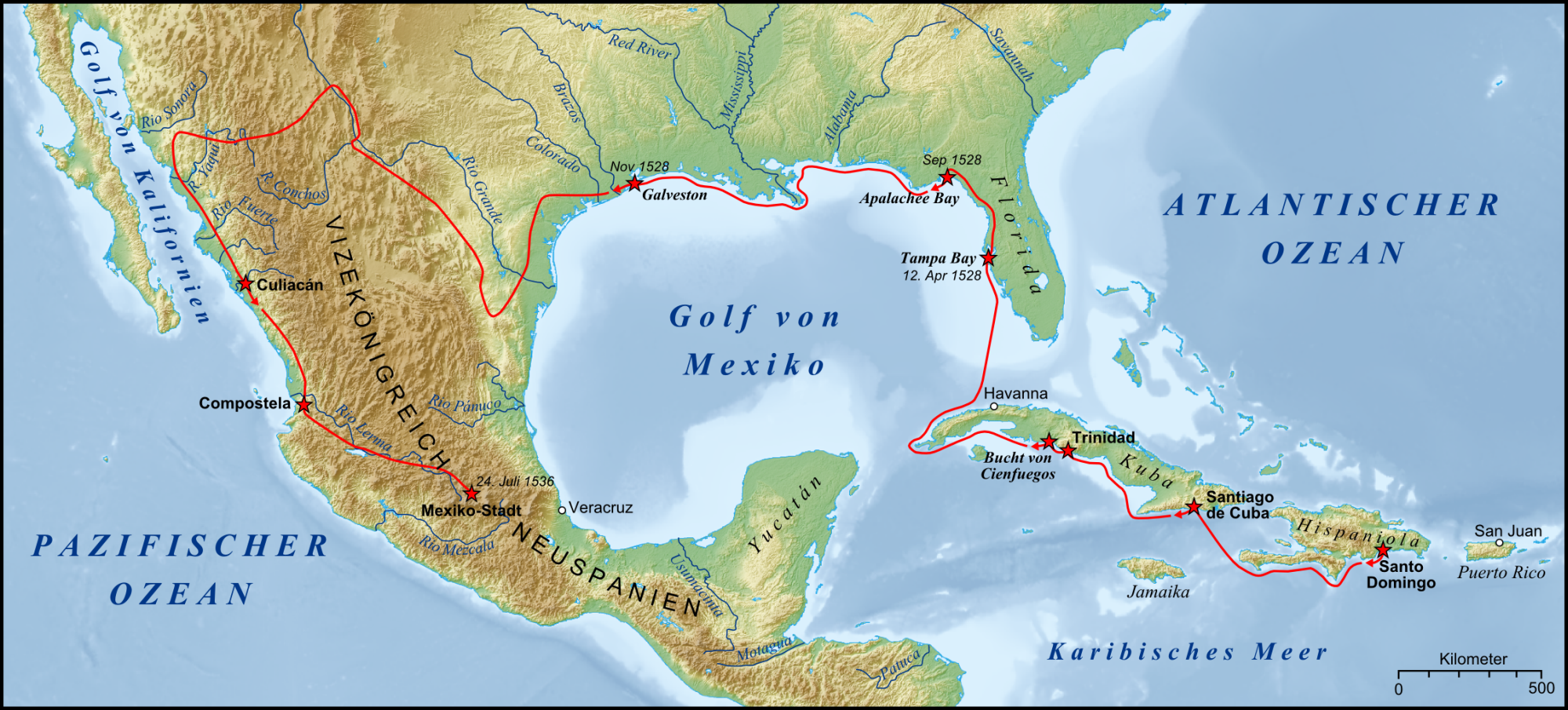
The approximate route of the Narváez expedition from Santo Domingo. From Galveston in November 1528, Cabeza de Vaca, Alonso del Castillo Maldonado, Andrés de Carranza and Esteban de Dorantes traveled for eight years on foot across the Southwest, accompanied by Indians, until reaching present-day Mexico City in 1536.

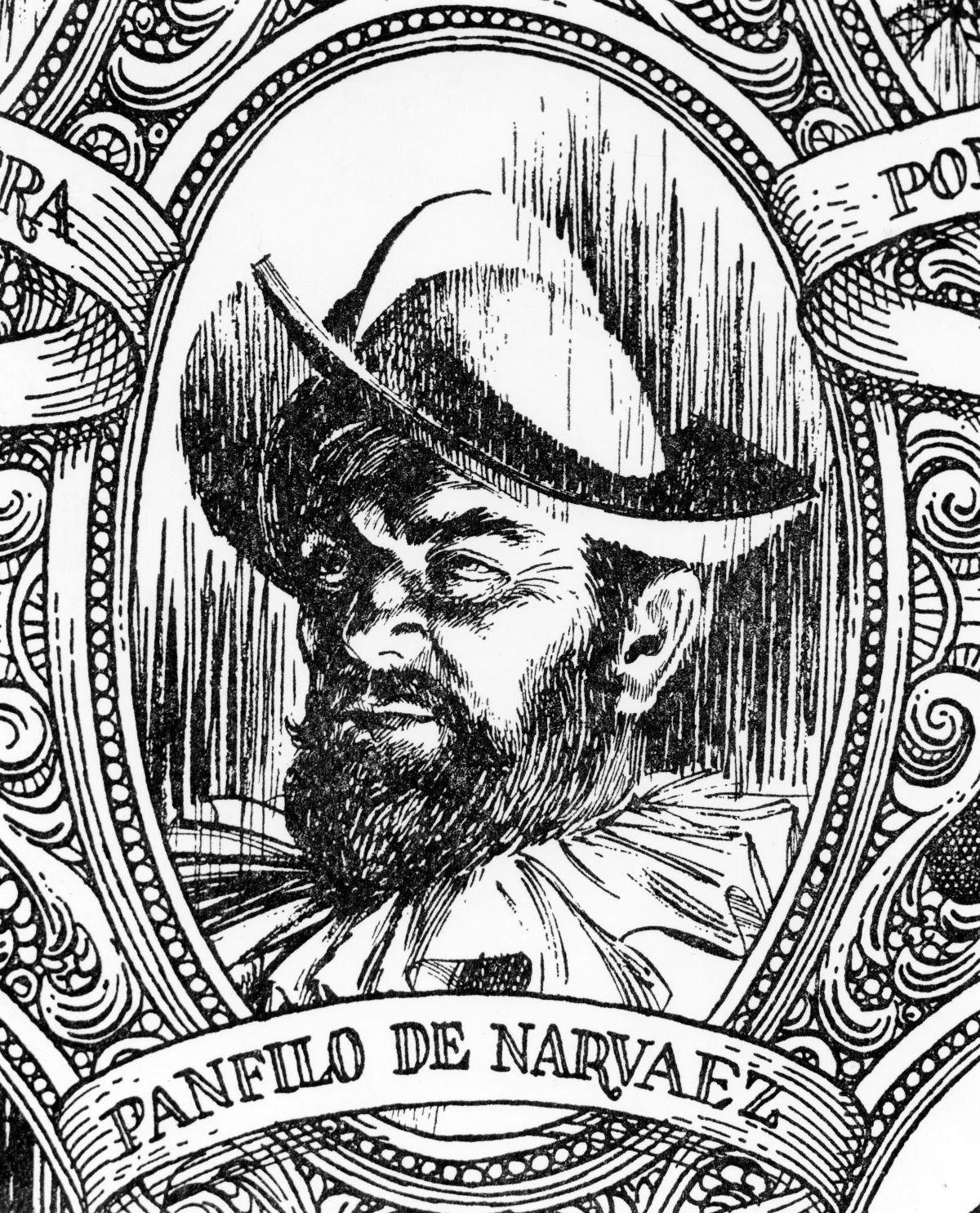
Pánfilo de Narváez

The Narváez expedition was a Spanish expedition started in 1527 that was intended to explore Florida and establish colonial settlements. The expedition was initially led by Pánfilo de Narváez, who died in 1528. Many more people died as the expedition traveled west along the unexplored Gulf Coast of the present-day United States and into the American southwest. Only four of the expedition's original members survived, reaching Mexico City in 1536. These survivors were the first known non-Native Americans to see the Mississippi River, and to cross the Gulf of Mexico and Texas.

Narváez's crew initially numbered about 600, including men from Spain, Portugal, Greece, and Italy. The expedition met with disaster almost immediately. Making stops at Hispaniola and Cuba on the way to La Florida, the fleet was devastated by a hurricane, among other storms, and lost two ships. They left Cuba in February 1528. Their intended destination was the Rio de las Palmas (near present-day Tampico, Mexico), with the purpose of founding two settlements. Storms, opposing currents, and strong winds forced them north to present-day Florida. After landing near Boca Ciega Bay, about 15 miles north of the entrance to Tampa Bay, Narváez and his pilots determined that their landing place was not suitable for settlement. Narváez ordered that the expedition be split, with 300 men sent overland northward along the coast and 100 men and ten women aboard the ships were also sent northward along the coast, as Narváez intended to reunify the land and seaborne expeditions at a supposed large harbor to the north of them that would be "impossible to miss". The land expedition and the ships never met, as no large harbor existed north of their landing location. As it marched northward, the land expedition encountered numerous attacks by indigenous forces and suffered from disease and starvation. By September 1528, following an attempt by the survivors to sail on makeshift rafts from Florida to Mexico, only 80 men survived a storm and were swept onto Galveston Island off the coast of Texas. The stranded survivors were enslaved by indigenous nations, and more men continued to die from harsh conditions.

Only four of the original party—Álvar Núñez Cabeza de Vaca, Alonso del Castillo Maldonado, Andrés Dorantes de Carranza, and Dorantes' enslaved Moroccan Estevanico—made it to Mexico (the 5th known survivor was Juan Ortiz, who lived with Native Americans north of Tampa until de Soto arrived in 1538), during which they wandered through what is now the southwestern United States and northern Mexico. They eventually encountered Spanish slave-catchers in Sinaloa in 1536, and with them, the four men finally reached Mexico City. Upon returning to Spain, Cabeza de Vaca wrote of the expedition in his La relación y comentarios ("The Account and Commentaries"), published in 1542 as the first written account of the indigenous peoples, wildlife, flora, and fauna of inland North America. It was published again by Cabeza de Vaca in 1555, this time to include descriptions of his subsequent experience as Governor of the Río de la Plata region in South America. A translation was later published under the title Naufragios ("Shipwrecks").

== Background ==
On December 25, 1526, Charles V, Holy Roman Emperor granted Pánfilo de Narváez a license to claim what is now the Gulf Coast of Mexico for the Kingdom of Spain. The contract gave him one year to gather an army, leave Spain, found at least two towns of one hundred people each, and garrison two additional forts anywhere along the coast. Narváez had to secure his own funding for the expedition. He recruited investors by marketing the promise of riches comparable to those recently discovered by Hernán Cortés in Mexico. He also called in many debts owed to him, and used this money to pay for major expenses of the expedition.

Appointed by the Spanish Crown as treasurer and sheriff, Álvar Núñez Cabeza de Vaca was to serve as the king's eyes and ears, and was second-in-command. He was to ensure the Crown received one fifth of any wealth acquired during the expedition. Other expedition members included Alonso de Solís as royal inspector of mines, Alonso Enríquez as comptroller, an Aztec prince called Don Pedro by the Spanish, and a contingent of Franciscan and diocesan priests led by Padre Juan Suárez (sometimes spelled Xuárez). Most of the expedition's 600 men were soldiers, chiefly from Spain and Portugal, including some of mixed African descent, and some 22 from Italy.

== The expedition ==
On June 17, 1527, the expedition departed Spain from the port of Sanlúcar de Barrameda at the mouth of the Guadalquivir River. The total force included about 450 troops, officers, and slaves. About 150 others were sailors, wives (married men could not travel without their wives to the Indies), and servants.

The first stop on the voyage was the Canary Islands, about a week's journey and 850 miles into the Atlantic. There the expedition resupplied such items as water, wine, firewood, meats, and fruit.

=== Hispaniola and Cuba ===
The explorers arrived in Santo Domingo (Hispaniola) sometime in August 1527. During the stay, troops began deserting. Although always a problem on such expeditions, the men may also have deserted because of hearing about the recent return of an expedition led by Lucas Vázquez de Ayllón, in which 450 of 600 men perished. Nearly 100 men deserted the Narváez expedition in the first month in Santo Domingo. The expedition stopped here to purchase horses, as well as two small ships for exploring the coastline. Although Narváez was able to buy only one small ship, he set sail once again.

The expedition arrived in Santiago de Cuba in late September. As Cuba was the home of Narváez and his family, he had many contacts through whom he could collect more supplies, horses, and men. After meeting with his wealthy friend Vasco Porcallo, Narváez sent part of the fleet to Trinidad to collect horses and other supplies from his friend's estate.

Narváez put Cabeza de Vaca and a captain named Pantoja in charge of two ships sent to Trinidad, while he took the other four ships to the Gulf of Guacanayabo. On about October 30, the two ships arrived in Trinidad to collect requisitioned supplies and seek additional crew. A hurricane arrived shortly after they did. During the storm, both ships sank, 60 men were killed, a fifth of the horses drowned, and all the new supplies acquired in Trinidad were destroyed.

Recognizing the need to regroup, Narváez sent the four remaining ships to Cienfuegos under the command of Cabeza de Vaca. Narváez stayed ashore in order to recruit men and purchase more ships. After nearly four months, on February 20, 1528, he arrived in Cienfuegos with one of two new ships and a few more recruits. The other ship he sent on to Havana. At this point, the expedition had about 400 men and 80 horses. The winter layover caused a depletion of supplies, and they planned to restock in Havana on the way to the Florida coast.

Among those hired by Narváez was a master pilot named Diego Miruelo, who claimed extensive knowledge of the Gulf Coast. Historians have debated for centuries his full identity and the extent of his knowledge. In any case, two days after leaving Cienfuegos, every ship in the fleet ran aground on the Canarreos shoals just off the coast of Cuba. They were stuck for two to three weeks, while the men depleted the already meager supplies. Not until the second week of March, when a storm created large seas, were they able to escape the shoals.

After battling more storms, the expedition rounded the western tip of Cuba and made its way toward Havana. Although they were close enough to see the masts of ships in port, the wind blew the fleet into the Gulf of Mexico without their reaching Havana. Narváez decided to press on with the journey and colonization plans. They spent the next month trying to reach the Mexican coast but could not overcome the Gulf Stream's powerful current.

=== Arrival in Florida ===
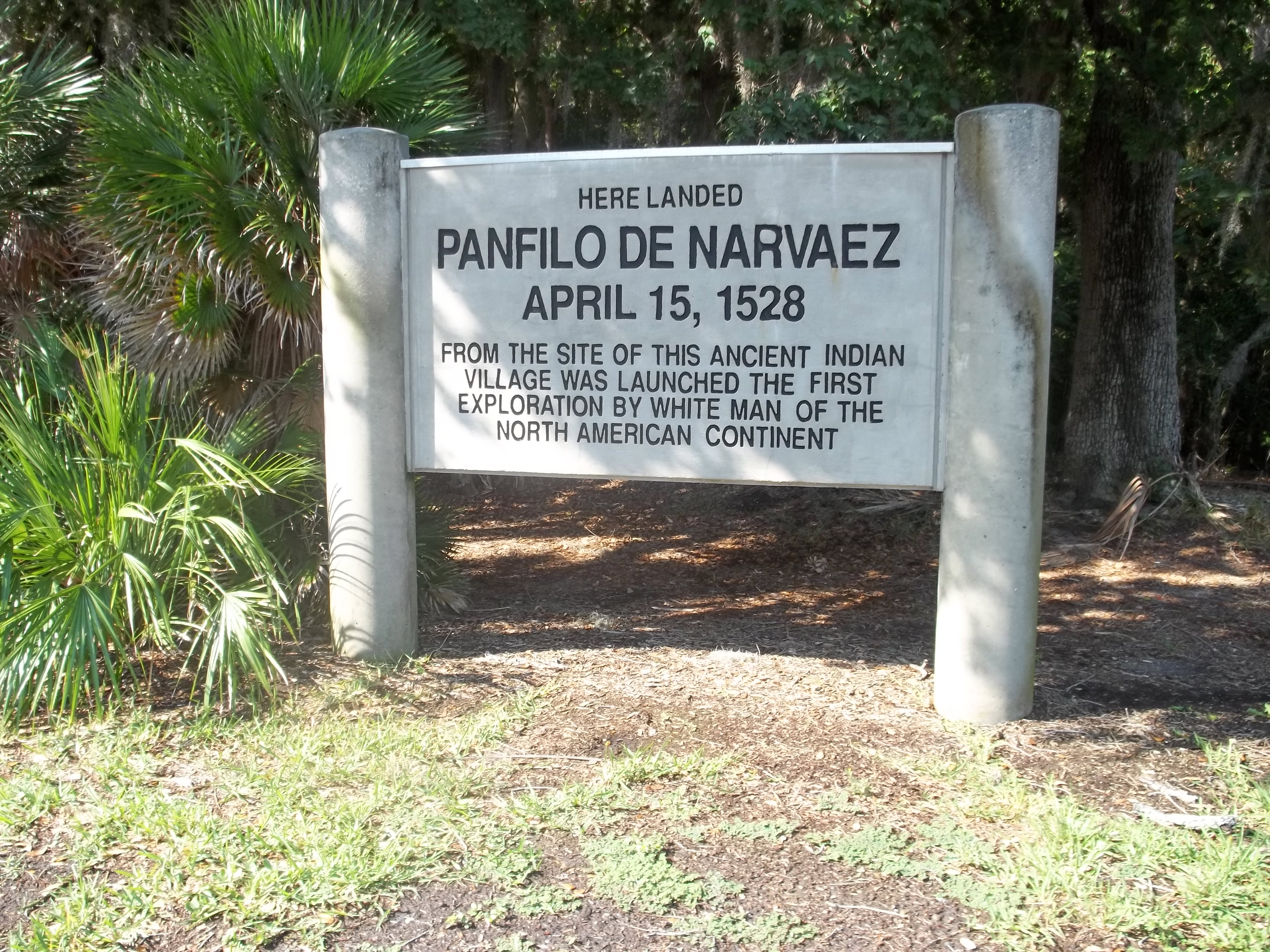
Marker at the Jungle Prada Site

On April 12, 1528, the expedition spotted land north of what is now Tampa Bay. They turned south and traveled for two days looking for what the pilot Miruelo described as a great harbor. During these two days, one of the five remaining ships was lost. Finally, after spotting a shallow bay, Narváez ordered entry. They passed into Boca Ciega Bay north of the entrance to Tampa Bay. They spotted buildings set upon earthen mounds, encouraging signs of culture, food, and water. The natives have since been identified as members of the Safety Harbor culture. The Spaniards dropped anchors and prepared to go ashore. Narváez landed with 300 men in Boca Ciega Bay at what is known as the Jungle Prada Site in present-day St. Petersburg.

The comptroller Alonso Enríquez was one of the first ashore. Making his way to the nearby native village, he traded items such as glass beads, brass bells, and cloth for fresh fish and venison. Narváez ordered the rest of the company to debark and establish a camp.

The next day, the royal officials assembled ashore and, with ritual, performed the formal declaration of Narváez as royal governor of La Florida. He read (in Spanish) the Requerimiento, which stated to any natives listening that their land belonged to Charles V by order of the pope. He also said that natives had the choice of converting to Christianity. If they converted, they would be loved and welcomed with open arms; if they chose not to, war would be made against them. The expedition ignored both pleas and threats by a party of natives the next day.

After some exploring, Narváez and some other officers discovered Old Tampa Bay. They headed back to the camp and ordered Miruelo to pilot a brigantine in search of the great harbor he had talked about. If he was unsuccessful, he should return to Cuba. Narváez never regained contact with Miruelo or any of the crew of the brig.

Meanwhile, Narváez took another party inland, where they found another village, perhaps Tocobaga. The villagers were using Spanish freight boxes as coffins. The Spanish destroyed these and found a little food and gold. The locals told them that there was plenty of both in Apalachee to the north. After returning to their base camp, the Spanish made plans to head north.

=== Narváez splits forces ===
On May 1, 1528, Narváez made the decision to split the expedition into land and sea contingents. He planned to have an army of 300 march overland to the north while the ships, with the remaining 100 people, sailed up the coast to meet them. He believed the mouth to Tampa Bay to be a short distance to the north, when in fact it was to the south. Cabeza de Vaca argued against this plan, but was outvoted by the rest of the officers. Narváez wanted Cabeza de Vaca to lead the sea force, but he refused. He later wrote it was a matter of honor, as Narváez had implied he was a coward.

The men marched in near-starvation for two weeks before coming upon a village north of the Withlacoochee River. They enslaved the natives and for three days helped themselves to corn from their fields. They sent two exploratory parties downstream on both sides of the river looking for signs of the ships, but found none. Narváez ordered the party to continue north to Apalachee.

Years later, Cabeza de Vaca learned what had become of the ships. Miruelo had returned to Old Tampa Bay in the brigantine and found all the ships gone. He sailed to Havana to pick up the fifth ship, which had been supplied, and brought it back to Tampa Bay. After heading north for some time without finding the party on land, commanders of the other three ships decided to return to Tampa Bay. After meeting, the fleet again searched for the land party for nearly a year before finally departing for Mexico. Juan Ortiz, a member of the naval force, was captured by the Uzita. He later escaped to Mocoso, where he lived until rescued by Hernando de Soto's expedition.

=== Meeting the Timucua ===
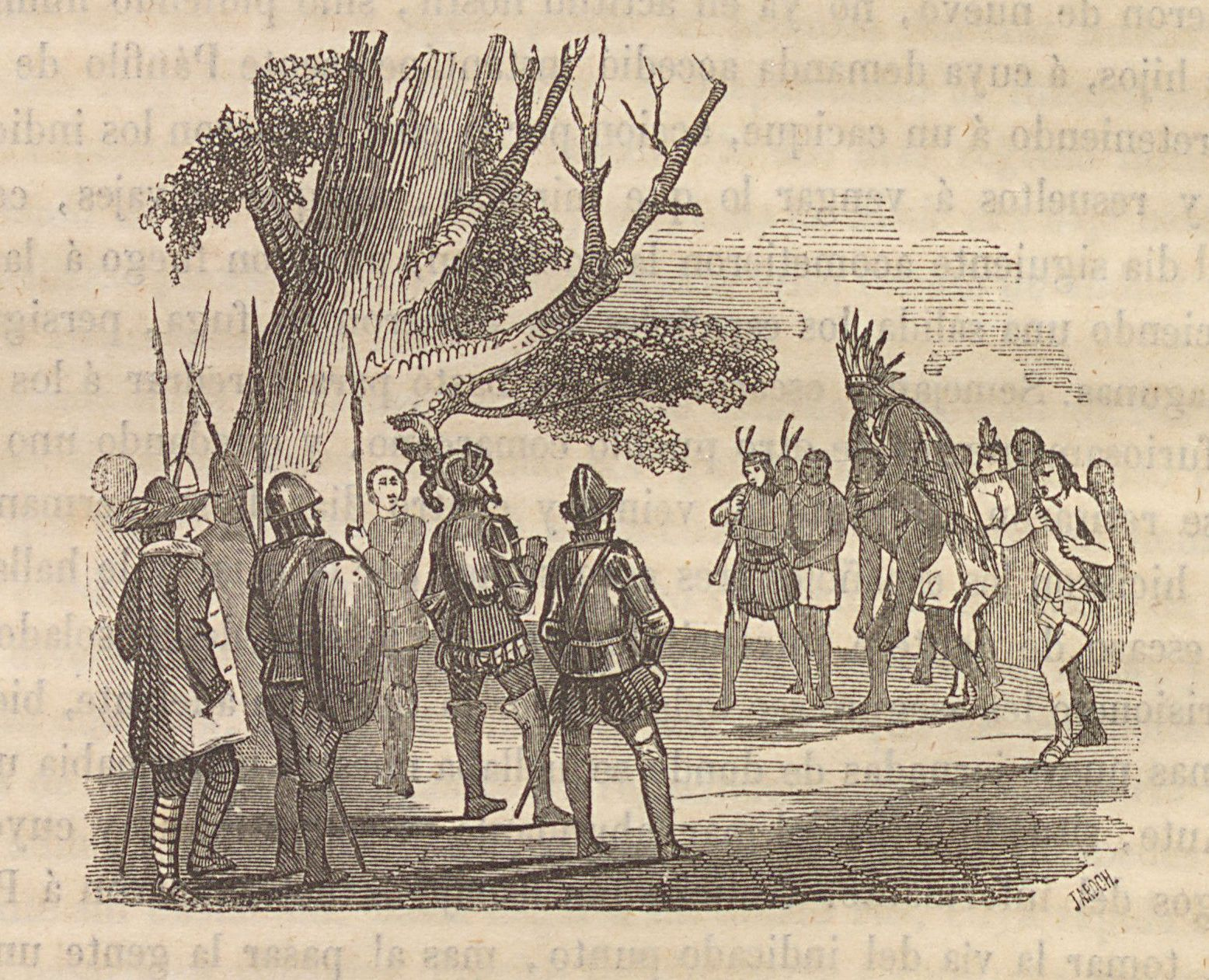
The Narváez expedition meets the Timucua Indians in 1528. Fanciful 1854 illustration

From scout reports, the Timucua knew the Spanish party was nearing their territory. They decided to meet the Europeans as they came near on June 18. Through hand signs and gestures, Narváez communicated to their chief, Dulchanchellin, that they were headed to Apalachee. Dulchanchellin appeared pleased by this (it turned out the Apalachee were his enemies).

After the two leaders exchanged gifts, the expedition followed the Timucua into their territory and crossed the Suwannee River. During the crossing, an officer named Juan Velázquez charged into it on his horse, and both drowned. His was the first non-shipwreck casualty of the expedition, and the men were disturbed by his death. The starving army cooked and ate his horse that night.

When the Spaniards arrived at the Timucua village on June 19, the chief sent them provisions of maize. That night, an arrow was shot past one of Narváez's men near a watering hole. The next morning, the Spaniards found the natives had deserted the village. They set out again for Apalachee. They soon realized they were being accompanied by hostile natives. Narváez laid a trap for the pursuing natives, and they captured three or four, whom they used as guides. The Spanish had no further contact with those Timucua.

=== Apalachee ===
On June 25, 1528, the expedition entered Apalachee territory. Finding a community of forty houses, they thought it was the capital, but it was a small outlying village of a much larger culture. The Spanish attacked, took several hostages including the village's cacique, and occupied the village. Although the villagers had none of the gold and riches Narváez was expecting, they did have much maize.

Soon after Narváez took the village, Apalachee warriors began attacking the Europeans. Their first attack was a force of 200 warriors, who used burning arrows to set fire to the houses the Europeans occupied. The warriors quickly dispersed, losing only one man. The next day a second force of 200 warriors, equipped with large bows, attacked from the opposite side of the village. This force also quickly dispersed and lost only one man.

After these direct attacks, the Apalachee changed to quick assaults after the Spanish started trekking again. They could fire their bows five or six times while the Spanish loaded a crossbow or harquebus, then fade away into the woods. They harassed the Spanish with guerrilla tactics continuously for the next three weeks. During this time, Narváez sent out three scouting missions in search of larger or wealthier towns. All three came back without good news. Frustrated by misfortune and failing health, Narváez ordered the expedition to head south. The Apalachee and Timucua captives told him that the people of Aute had a great deal of food, and their village was near the sea. The party had to cross a large swamp to reach the place.

For the first two days out of the village, the Spaniards were not attacked, but once they were up to their chests in water in the swamp, the Apalachee attacked them with a shower of arrows. Nearly helpless, the Spanish could neither use their horses nor quickly reload their heavy weapons, and they found their armor weighing them down in water. After regaining solid ground, they drove off the attackers. For the next two weeks, they made their difficult way through the swamp, occasionally under attack by the Apalachee.

When the Spanish finally reached Aute, they found the village already deserted and burnt. They harvested enough corn, beans, and squash from the garden to feed their party, many of whom were starving, wounded and sick. After two days, Narváez sent Cabeza de Vaca to look for an opening to the sea. He did not find the sea, but after half a day's march along the Wakulla River and St. Marks River, he found shallow, salty water filled with oyster beds. Two more days of scouting produced no better results, and the men returned to tell Narváez the news.

Narváez decided to go to the oyster beds for the food. With many of the horses carrying the sick and wounded, the Spanish realized they were struggling for survival. Some considered cannibalism to survive. During the march, some of the caballeros talked about stealing their horses and abandoning everyone else. Although Narváez was too ill to take action, Cabeza de Vaca learned of the plan and convinced them to stay.

After a few days stuck near the shallow waters, one man came up with a plan: he suggested reforging their weaponry and armor to make tools and to build new boats to sail to Mexico. The party agreed and started action on August 4, 1528.

They constructed a forge out of a log and used deerskins for the bellows. They cut down trees and made charcoal for the forge. Then they made hammers, saws, axes, and nails out of their iron gear. Caulking was made from the pitch of pine trees, and palmetto leaves were used as oakum. They sewed shirts together for sails. Occasionally they raided the Aute village, from which they stole 640 bushels of corn to sustain themselves during the construction. Twice, within sight of the camp, ten men gathering shellfish were killed by Apalachee raids.

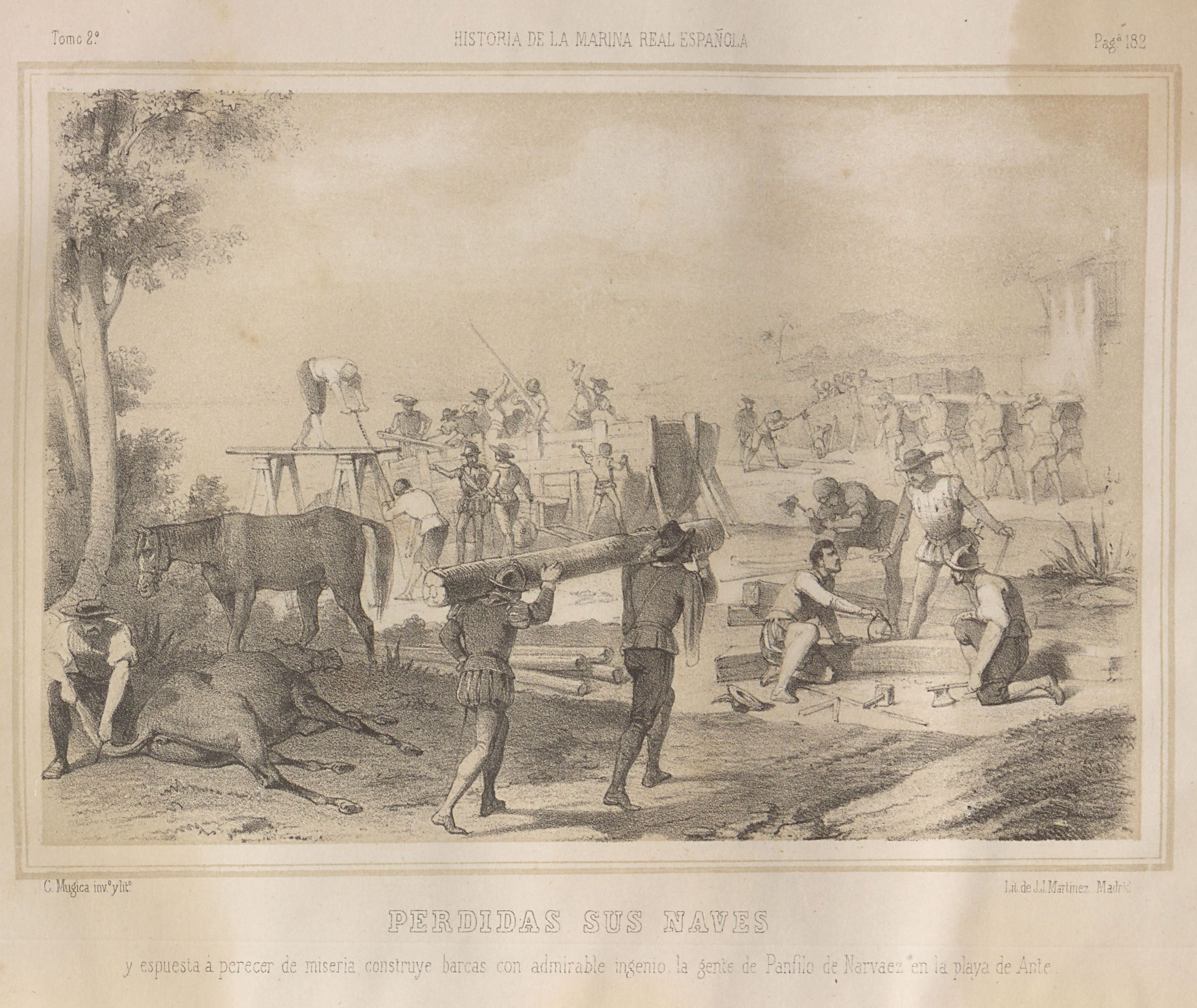
Narváez expedition in 1528, Apalachee Bay.

The men killed their horses for food and material while they were building the boats – one horse every three days. They used horsehair to braid rope and the skins for water storage bags. As horses were highly valued by the Spanish, especially the nobility, they named the bay, now known as Apalachee Bay, "Bahia de los Caballos" in honor of the sacrifice of the animals.

By September 20, they had finished building five boats. They sailed on September 22, 1528. After being ravaged by disease, starvation, and attacks by the various peoples they intended to conquer, 242 men had survived. About 50 men were carried by each boat, which were thirty to forty feet long and had a shallow draft, sail, and oars.

=== South Texas ===
Closely following the Gulf Coast, the boats proceeded to the west, but frequent storms, thirst and starvation reduced the expedition to about 80 survivors before a hurricane cast Cabeza de Vaca and his remaining men on the western shore of a barrier island. There they suffered hunger and disease, causing them to name the island the "island of misfortune," "island of doom," or "island of ill fortune" (variously translated). Historians believe they landed at present-day Galveston, Texas. However, other historians have pointed out that there are several inconsistencies between Cabeza de Vaca's description of the island and Galveston Island. As a result, many historians believe that it is more likely that Cabeza de Vaca and his companions actually landed at what is now Follet's Island, immediately southwest of Galveston Island. Narváez is believed to have been swept out to sea during a storm.

For the next four years, Cabeza de Vaca and a steadily dwindling number of his comrades lived in the complex indigenous world of South Texas, where tribes of different cultures and languages often lived in conflict with one another. Cabeza de Vaca wrote detailed anthropological notes on the customs and culture of the people he met, including a few tribes that have been tentatively identified by modern researchers, such as the Karankawa people along the Gulf Coast and the Tonkawa in central Texas. Most tribe names in the Relación, however, are not attested by any other written source and difficult to link to any tribes mentioned elsewhere.

=== Southwestern North America ===
By 1532, only four members of the original expedition survived: Alonso del Castillo Maldonado, Andrés Dorantes de Carranza, Álvar Núñez Cabeza de Vaca, and Estevanico, an enslaved Moor. They headed west and gradually south hoping to reach the Spanish Empire's outpost in Mexico, becoming the first men of Europe and Africa to enter Southwestern North America (present day Southwestern United States and Northwest Mexico). Their precise route has been difficult for historians to determine, but they apparently traveled across present-day Texas, perhaps into New Mexico and Arizona, and through Mexico's northern provinces near the Pacific Coast before turning inland.

In July 1536, near Culiacán in present-day Sinaloa, the survivors encountered fellow Spaniards on a slave-taking expedition for New Spain. As Cabeza de Vaca wrote later, his countrymen were "dumbfounded at the sight of me, strangely dressed and in the company of Indians. They just stood staring for a long time." The Spaniards accompanied the survivors to Mexico City. Estevanico later served as a guide for other expeditions. Cabeza de Vaca returned to Spain, where he wrote a full account, especially describing the many indigenous peoples they encountered. He later served the colonial government in South America.

== Representation in other media ==
The Moor's Account, a 2014 novel by Laila Lalami, is a fictional memoir of Estebanico, the Moroccan slave who accompanied Cabeza de Vaca as one of the four survivors of the expedition. He is known as the first black explorer of America. Lalami explains that nothing is known about him except for one line in Cabeza de Vaca's chronicle: "The fourth [survivor] is Estevanico, an Arab Negro from Azamor." It was a finalist for the 2015 Pulitzer Prize in fiction. A Land So Strange, a 2007 historical narrative by Andrés Reséndez, retells the journey for a modern audience using primary sources by Cabeza de Vaca and the official report. Esteban: The African Slave Who Explored America, a 2018 nonfiction biography by Dennis Herrick, dispels centuries of myths and inaccuracies about the African. The Gentle Conquistadors, a 1971 children's novel by Jeannette Mirsky and Thomas Morley, gives a somewhat fictionalized account of the expedition.

== See also ==
- Hernando de Soto, Narváez's successor
- Mocoso

== Sources ==
- Herdick, Dennis (2018). Esteban: The African Slave Who Explored America. Albuquerque: University of New Mexico Press. ISBN 978-0-8263-5981-0.
- Adorno, Rolena; Pautz, Patrick (1999-09-15). Álvar Núñez Cabeza de Vaca: His Account, His Life, and the Expedition of Panfilo de Narváez. Vol. 3 vol. Lincoln: University of Nebraska Press. ISBN 978-0-8032-1463-7.
- Gil-Osle, Juan Pablo. “Cabeza de Vaca’s Primahaitu Pidgin, O’odham Nation, and euskaldunak.” Journal of the Southwest 60.1 (2018): 252-68.
- Maura, Juan Francisco. Alvar Núñez Cabeza de Vaca: el gran burlador de América. Parnaseo/Lemir. Valencia: Universidad de Valencia, 2008
- Núñez Cabeza de Vaca, Álvar.
  - Enrique Pupo-Walker, ed. (1993-09-23) [1542]. Castaways. Translated by Frances Lopez-Morillas. Berkeley: University of California Press. ISBN 978-0-520-07063-9.
  - The Account: Álvar Núñez Cabeza de Vaca's Relación. Translated by Martin Favata; Jose Fernández. Houston: Arte Público Press. February 1993 [1542]. ISBN 978-1-55885-060-6.
- Oviedo y Valdez, Gonzalo Fernandez (1974). The Journey of the Vaca Party: The Account of the Narváez Expedition, 1528–1536, as Related by Gonzalo Fernández de Oviedo y Valdés. Translated by Basil Hedrick; Carroll L Riley. Carbondale, Illinois: University Museum Studies, Southern Illinois University.
- Schneider, Paul (2006-05-02). Brutal Journey: the epic story of the first crossing of North America. New York: Henry Holt and Company. ISBN 978-0-8050-6835-1.
- Varnum, Robin (2014). Alvar Nunez Cabeza de Vaca: American Trailblazer. University of Oklahoma Press. ISBN 9780806144979.
