= Charles M. Hudson =

American academic (1932–2013)

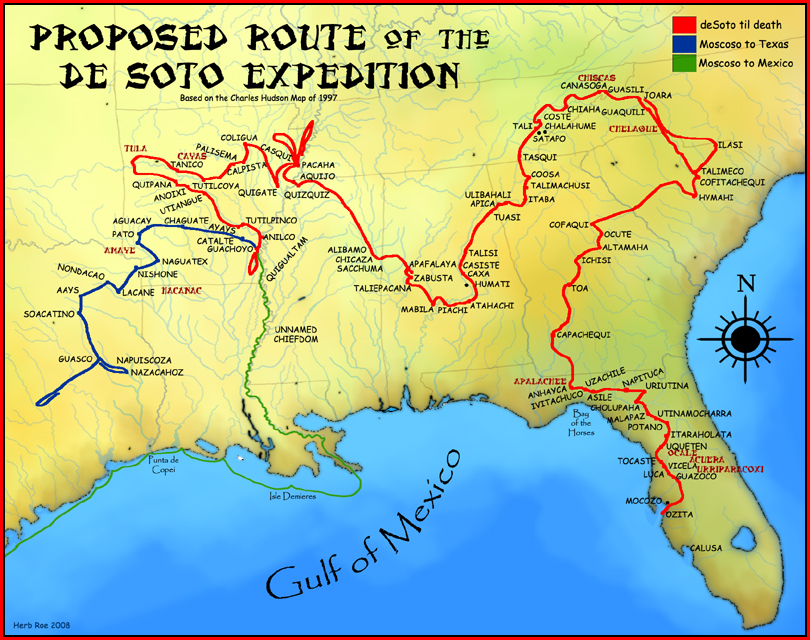
A map showing a proposed de Soto Expedition route, based on the 1998 Charles M. Hudson book Knights of Spain, Warriors of the Sun

Charles Melvin Hudson Jr. (1932–2013) was an anthropologist, a professor of anthropology and history at the University of Georgia. He was a leading scholar on the history and culture of Indigenous peoples of the Southeastern Woodlands of the present-day United States. He is known for his book mapping the expedition of Spanish explorer Hernando de Soto in the mid-16th century in the Southeast, based on both the expedition's records and sites identified through archeology and anthropology.

He also published books with detailed discussion of two 16th-century Spanish expeditions in the Southeast: Knights of Spain, Warriors of the Sun: Hernando De Soto and the South's Ancient Chiefdoms (1997) and The Juan Pardo Expeditions: Exploration of the Carolinas and Tennessee, 1566–1568 (2005).

== Life ==
Born in 1932, Hudson grew up on a farm in Owen County, Kentucky, and attended local schools.

He served in the U.S. Air Force during the Korean War. After the war, he used the G.I. Bill to attend the University of Kentucky, receiving a bachelor's degree in anthropology in 1958. He pursued graduate studies in anthropology at the University of North Carolina, Chapel Hill, earning an M.A. (1962) and a Ph.D. (1965).

Upon earning his doctorate, he became a faculty member in the anthropology department at the University of Georgia. He served there for 35 years as a professor of anthropology and history, retiring in 2007. In retirement, Hudson returned to Kentucky. He died at Frankfort on June 8, 2013.

== Scholarly work ==
Hudson published The Southeastern Indians (University of Tennessee Press, 1976), a comprehensive overview of the region's native peoples.

He was perhaps best known for his extensive research of Hernando de Soto's 1539–1543 expedition across the Southeast. In 1984, Hudson and fellow researchers Marvin T. Smith and Chester DePratter mapped the route taken by de Soto's expedition by using written accounts of expedition members, and matching them with geographic features and the results of continuing excavations of archaeological evidence of Indian settlements. Hudson and his colleagues argued that the sites of these settlements formed a chain across the Southeast that marked the path that would have been taken by the expedition.

His other works included Knights of Spain, Warriors of the Sun (University of Georgia Press, 1997), a detailed narrative account of the 16th century de Soto expedition, and The Juan Pardo Expeditions: Exploration of the Carolinas and Tennessee, 1566–1568 (2005), about a second expedition, during which the Spanish built six forts. In the 21st century, archeological evidence has been found for both Fort San Juan, and the chiefdom of Joara. Joara was the largest Mississippian culture chiefdom in present-day North Carolina.

A strong advocate of fostering close ties between the disciplines of anthropology and history, Hudson was one of the founders of the Southern Anthropological Society. He served as president of the organization in 1973–74. In 1993–94 he served as president of the American Society for Ethnohistory.

In his retirement, Hudson began writing historical novels.

== Quote ==
The problem of writing the social history of the Native peoples of the Southeast is formidable. One has to simultaneously represent both synchronic social and cultural systems and the diachronic change that transforms them. One has to both represent the exotic world of the Southeastern chiefdoms and the European world-system that impinged upon them as "storms brewed in other men's lands" and in time destroyed, dissolved, or enveloped by them. And we must do it with the merest fragments of archaeological and oral evidence. As cultural and social beings, the Native peoples of the Southeast have been fundamentally transformed by history several times over, as have we all. If the Native peoples of the Americas are ever to be more than moral fodder for various ideologies—whether left, right, or postmodern—they must find their proper place in the social history of the modern world. Since 1976 some progress has been made on this front by archaeologists, ethnohistorians, and historians, but much more remains to be done.

— Charles M. Hudson, 2000

== Works ==
- Hudson, Charles M., The Southeastern Indians. University of Tennessee Press. 1976. ISBN 0-87049-248-9
- Hudson, Charles M., Black Drink: A Native American Tea. University of Georgia Press. 1979. ISBN 0-8203-0462-X
- Hudson, Charles M., Knights of Spain, Warriors of the Sun: Hernando De Soto and the South's Ancient Chiefdoms, University of Georgia Press, 1997. ISBN 0-8203-1888-4
- Hudson, Charles M., Conversations with the High Priest of Coosa. University of North Carolina Press. 2003. ISBN 0-8078-5421-2
- Hudson, Charles M., and Carmen Chaves Tesser, The Forgotten Centuries. University of Georgia Press. 1994. ISBN 0-8203-1654-7
- Hudson, Charles M. (Editor), Red, White, and Black.
- Hudson, Charles M., The Juan Pardo Expeditions: Exploration of the Carolinas and Tennessee, 1566–1568. University of Alabama Press. 2005. ISBN 978-0-8173-5190-8
- Hudson, Charles M., The Packhorseman. University of Alabama Press. 2009. ISBN 978-0-8173-5540-1

== See also ==
- Mississippian culture
- Southeastern Ceremonial Complex
- Coosa chiefdom
