= List of people from Jacksonville, Florida =

The city of Jacksonville, Florida, has been home to many notable people, groups, and organizations. Those listed may have been born or raised in Jacksonville, been influenced by the city while living, working or retiring there, or lived in the metropolitan area.

== Civil rights leaders ==
Listed chronologically by year of birth:

- James Weldon Johnson (1871–1938), educator, lawyer, diplomat, songwriter, and civil rights activist; wrote The Autobiography of an Ex-Colored Man and the words to "Lift Every Voice and Sing"
- A. Philip Randolph (1889–1979), African-American civil rights activist
- MaVynee Betsch (1935–2005), Black activist and environmentalist for American Beach

== Religious leaders ==
Listed chronologically by year of birth:

- Cataline Simmons (1806–1883), first pastor of Bethel Baptist Institutional Church
- William John Kenny (1853–1913), bishop of Roman Catholic Diocese of St. Augustine
- Laura Adorkor Kofi (1893–1928), minister and activist of the Universal Negro Improvement Association and African Communities League
- George Moyer Alexander (1914–1983), fifth bishop of the Episcopal Diocese of Upper South Carolina
- Homer G. Lindsay, Jr. (1927–2000), influential preacher and former pastor of the nation's third largest Southern Baptist church
- Frank Cerveny (1933–2026), Episcopal bishop of Florida
- Robert Hodges Johnson (1934–2025), fifth bishop of Episcopal Diocese of Western North Carolina
- Jerry Vines (born 1937), president, Southern Baptist Convention, and former pastor of the nation's third-largest Southern Baptist church
- Neil Lebhar (born 1950), first bishop of the Gulf Atlantic Diocese
- John Howard (born 1951), Episcopal bishop of Florida
- George D. Young III (born 1955), fourth bishop of the Episcopal Diocese of East Tennessee
- Mac Brunson (born 1957), pastor of First Baptist Church of Jacksonville, First Baptist Church Dallas

== Political and government leaders ==
Listed chronologically by year of birth:

- Saturiwa (16th century), paramount chief of the Saturiwa chiefdom, comprising 30 Mocama Timucua villages in present-day Jacksonville
- Jean Ribault (1520–1565), French naval officer who led the first recorded expedition to the Jacksonville area
- René Goulaine de Laudonnière (c. 1529–1574), founder of Fort Caroline in modern Jacksonville, the first French settlement in North America
- Isaiah Hart (1792–1861), plantation owner and founder of Jacksonville
- Ossian B. Hart (1821–1874), 10th governor of Florida 1873–1874 and Florida Supreme Court Justice
- Francis P. Fleming (1841–1908), 15th governor of Florida 1889–1893
- Napoleon B. Broward (1857–1910), 19th governor of Florida 1905–1909; Jacksonville sheriff 1888–1894
- Duncan U. Fletcher (1859–1936), two-term mayor of Jacksonville and U.S. senator 1909–1936
- Claude L'Engle (1868–1919), United States representative from Florida
- St. Elmo W. Acosta (1875–1947), city commissioner, state legislator and parks commissioner
- Ion Farris (1878–1934), former speaker of the Florida House of Representatives and member of the Florida Senate
- John W. Martin (1884–1958), former Jacksonville mayor and 24th governor of Florida 1921–1925
- Emory H. Price (1899–1976), U.S. representative from Florida
- Fuller Warren (1905–1973), 30th governor of Florida 1949–1953
- Charles Edward Bennett (1910–2003), U.S. representative from 2nd/3rd congressional district 1949–1993
- W. Haydon Burns (1912–1987), 35th governor of Florida 1965–1967; Jacksonville mayor 1949–1965
- Dorcas Drake (1916–1993), Duval County judge and philanthropist
- Alan Stephenson Boyd (1922–2020), the first United States secretary of transportation
- Ed Austin (1926–2011), mayor of Jacksonville 1991–1995; state attorney 1969–1972, 1974–1991
- Willye Dennis (1926–2012), Florida House of Representatives: 15th District 1992–2009
- Edward L. Howard (1926–2011), Pennsylvania state senator: 10th District 1971–1986
- Claude R. Kirk, Jr. (1926–2011), 36th governor of Florida 1967–1971
- Lou Ritter (1926–2010), mayor of Jacksonville 1965–1967
- Hans Tanzler (1927–2013), mayor of Jacksonville 1967–1979
- Don Davis (1931–2008), Jacksonville City Council 1987–1999, state representative 1999–2008 and civic leader
- Lou Frost (1931–2008), lawyer and public defender 1968–2005
- Maurice M. Paul (1932–2016), United States District Court for the Northern District of Florida judge
- Don Fuqua (born 1933), U.S. representative from 9th/2nd congressional district 1963–1987
- Jake Godbold (1933–2020), former mayor of Jacksonville 1978–1987
- Frank F. Ledford, Jr. (1934–2019), former Surgeon General of the U.S. Army
- E. Pope Bassett (1935–2020), lawyer and member of the Florida House of Representatives from the 44th district
- Bill Birchfield (1935–2016), state legislator 1970–1974, lawyer, civic leader
- Tom Slade, Jr. (1936–2014), legislator, lobbyist, businessman
- Jim McMillan (born 1937), sheriff of Jacksonville 1986–1996
- James E. King (1939–2009), state representative 1986–1999; state senator 1999–2009
- Harry Shorstein (born 1941), lawyer and state attorney, 4th Judicial Circuit 1991–2008
- Tillie Fowler (1942–2005), U.S. representative: 4th congressional district 1993–2001; Jacksonville City Council: 1985–1992
- Nat Glover (born 1943), first African-American sheriff of Jacksonville 1995–2003
- Ander Crenshaw (born 1944), state representative 1972–1978; state senator 1986–1994; U.S. representative: 4th congressional district 2001–2017
- Mike Blouin (born 1945), U.S. representative for Iowa's Second Congressional District
- Tommy Hazouri (1945–2021), Jacksonville mayor 1987–1991 and state representative 1974–1986
- Corrine Brown (born 1946), U.S. representative 1993–2017
- John Rutherford (born 1952), sheriff of Jacksonville 2004–2015, U.S. representative 2017–present
- Angela Corey (born 1954), lawyer and state attorney, 4th Judicial Circuit 2009–2012
- John Delaney (born 1956), mayor of Jacksonville 1995–2003 and president of the University of North Florida 2003–2018
- Thom Tillis (born 1960), former speaker of the North Carolina House of Representatives and U.S. senator from North Carolina; brother of Rick Tillis
- Alvin Brown (born 1961), first African-American mayor of Jacksonville 2011–2015
- Kim Shepard (born 1964), member of the Florida House of Representatives
- Rick Tillis (born 1963), member of the Tennessee House of Representatives; brother of Thom Tillis
- Mark Green (born 1964), U.S. representative for Tennessee
- John Peyton (born 1964), Jacksonville mayor 2004–2011
- Jim Walsh (born 1964), state representative from Washington 2016–present, chair of the Washington State Republican Party 2023–present
- T. K. Waters (born 1970), sheriff of Jacksonville since 2022
- Ron DeSantis (born 1978), former U.S. representative for Florida's 6th Congressional District, 46th governor of Florida
- Angie Nixon (born 1984), member of the Florida House of Representatives

== Business and civic leaders ==
Listed chronologically by year of birth:

- Zephaniah Kingsley (1765–1843), major slaveholder and owner of Kingsley Plantation
- Anna Kingsley (1793–1870), former slave, common-law wife of Kingsley, who became a businesswoman and slaveholder
- Martha Reed Mitchell (1818–1902), philanthropist and socialite
- Henry Morrison Flagler (1830–1913), tycoon, real estate promoter, railroad developer and partner in Standard Oil
- Alice A. W. Cadwallader (1832–1910), philanthropist and temperance activist
- Alexander Darnes (c.1840–1894), born into slavery, gained his medical degree and became first black doctor of Jacksonville
- Minnie E. Neal (1858–1945), photographer and temperance leader
- Alfred I. duPont (1864–1935), industrialist, financier and philanthropist
- Abraham Lincoln Lewis (1865–1947), businessman and developer of American Beach, Florida
- Cora Crane (1865–1910), journalist, brothel owner known for her relationship with Stephen Crane, lived in the Jacksonville area from 1894
- Eartha M. M. White (1876–1974), African-American philanthropist and humanitarian
- Maxey Dell Moody (1883–1949), founder of M. D. Moody & Sons, Inc.
- Jessie Ball duPont (1884–1970), teacher and philanthropist
- Charles E. Merrill (1885–1956), co-founder of Merrill, Lynch & Company
- Ed Ball (1888–1981), businessman who ran the Alfred I. duPont Testamentary Trust for 46 years
- H. Terry Parker (1890–1970), philanthropist; co-founder of Gulf Life Insurance Co., vice president of A.B. Farquhar Company
- Leslie R. Nicholas (1902–1948), The Guardian Life Insurance Company of America executive and Pacific War veteran
- Louis Wolfson (1912–2007), Wall Street financier, race horse owner-breeder and philanthropist
- Maxey Dell Moody, Jr. (1913–1987), businessman and founder of MOBRO Marine, Inc.
- J. J. Daniel (1916–1990), lawyer, businessman and civic leader
- Claude Yates (1916–1988), Southern Bell executive and "father of Jacksonville Consolidation"
- Leslie Nicholas Jr. (1927–2007), Southern Bell executive
- Raymond K. Mason (1927–2020), CEO of Charter Company and protégé of Ed Ball
- Herb Peyton (born 1932), founder of Gate Petroleum and civic leader
- Lex Hester (1935–2000), city manager and key architect of Jacksonville's consolidated government
- Wayne Weaver (born 1935), shoe mogul and former owner of Jacksonville Jaguars (1993–2011)
- Stumpy Harris (1938–2021), eminent domain lawyer and major donor and supporter of the Florida Gators
- Preston Haskell (born 1938), founder and chairman, The Haskell Company; minority owner of Jacksonville Jaguars, civic leader
- Tom Petway (born 1940), businessman, Jacksonville Jaguars minority partner, civic leader
- Theodore Roosevelt IV (born 1942), businessman and great-grandson of President Theodore Roosevelt
- Maxey Dell Moody III (born 1944), businessman
- Donald Moran (born 1945), chief judge of 4th judicial circuit 1977–2014
- Dan Peña (born 1945), businessman and motivational speaker
- Steve Pajcic (born 1946), lawyer, state representative, Florida Gubernatorial candidate and philanthropist
- Gary Pajcic (1947–2006), athlete, lawyer and philanthropist
- Elizabeth Edwards (1949–2010), attorney, law professor and wife of Senator John Edwards
- Shahid Khan (born 1950), entrepreneur and owner of the Jacksonville Jaguars
- John Palumbo (born 1958), motivational speaker, businessman and salesman
- John Michael Phillips (born 1975), attorney, motivational speaker and news commentator

== Artists, architects, photographers and designers ==
- Henry John Klutho (1873–1964), Prairie School architect who influenced redevelopment of Jacksonville following the Great Fire of 1901
- Victor Earl Mark (1876–1948), architect
- Sanford Augustus Brookins (1877–1968), architect, builder, and businessperson; active in the neighborhoods of Sugar Hill, Durkee Gardens, and Riverside
- Augusta Savage (1892–1962), sculptor associated with the Harlem Renaissance
- Denham Fouts (1914–1949), prostitute, socialite and literary muse
- Taylor Hardwick (1925–2014), architect of Jacksonville schools, businesses and parks
- David Johnson (1926–2024), photographer of San Francisco's Fillmore District, first African-American student of Ansel Adams
- Mildred Thompson (1935–2003), painter, printmaker and sculptor
- Carey Cavanaugh (born 1955), professor and former ambassador/peace mediator
- Diana Eng (born 1983), fashion designer and contestant on Season 2 of Project Runway
- Arthur Cogswell (1930–2010), an architect known for his work in Modernist architecture

== Writers ==
Listed chronologically by year of birth:

- Harriet Beecher Stowe (1811–1896), author and abolitionist, best known for Uncle Tom's Cabin
- Stephen Crane (1871–1900), author of The Red Badge of Courage, lived in Jacksonville for a few weeks in 1896 and 1897; the stay inspired "The Open Boat"
- Zora Neale Hurston (1891–1960), author and anthropologist, known for Their Eyes Were Watching God, lived in Jacksonville during several periods from 1904
- Frank G. Slaughter (1908-2001), physician and author whose books sold more than 60 million copies.
- Pat Frank (1908–1964), journalist and novelist
- Stetson Kennedy (1916–2011), author, folklorist and human rights activist who infiltrated the Ku Klux Klan, exposing its secrets to authorities and the outside world
- Madeleine L'Engle (1918–2007), author of A Wrinkle in Time
- E. L. Konigsburg (1930–2013), Newbery-winning novelist
- Rebecca Heflin (born 1963), women's fiction and romance novelist
- Charles Martin (born 1969), New York Times-bestselling author
- Deesha Philyaw (born c. 1971), author of The Secret Lives of Church Ladies
- Dawnie Walton (born 1976), journalist and author of The Final Revival of Opal & Nev
- Greg Wrenn (born c. 1980), poet and nonfiction writer

== Scientists and scholars ==
- Arthur Pratt Warner (1870–1957), aviator, inventor
- Mazie O. Tyson (c. 1900–1975), geographer, college professor
- John Archibald Wheeler (1911–2008), theoretical physicist
- John R. Platt (1918–1992), professor of physics and biophysics at the University of Chicago
- Philip Don Estridge (1937–1985), "father of the IBM PC," led development of original IBM Personal Computer
- Norman E. Thagard (born 1943), NASA astronaut
- George Smoot (1945–2025), Nobel Prize for Physics laureate, born in Yukon, an incorporated ghost town in Jacksonville
- Michael Persinger (1945–2018), neuroscientist, psychologist and noted philanthropist
- Susana Urbina (born 1946), psychologist, professor at the University of North Florida
- Jack D. Keene (born 1947), James B. Duke Professor of Molecular Genetics and Microbiology at Duke University
- Michael D. Reynolds (1954–2019), astronomy professor, author and educator
- Charles T. Meide (born 1971), maritime archaeologist and director of LAMP at the St. Augustine Lighthouse
- Kevin Folta (born 1967), professor of horticultural sciences at the University of North Florida

== Athletes ==
Listed chronologically by year of birth:

- Bob Gandy (1893–1945), MLB outfielder
- Paul Schreiber (1902–1982), MLB pitcher and coach
- Coley Wallace (1927–2005), heavyweight boxer and actor
- Tom Scott (1930–2015), NFL linebacker
- Don Bessent (1931–1990), MLB pitcher
- John Chaney (1932–2021), basketball coach
- Dennis Viollet (1933–1999), men's soccer coach
- Al Frazier (1935–2018), college all-American and NFL football player
- LeeRoy Yarbrough (1938–1984), NASCAR driver
- Al Denson (born 1942), NFL wide receiver
- Bob Hayes (1942–2002), 1964 Olympic gold medalist (2) sprinter; Hall of Fame NFL wide receiver
- Joseph Dube (1944–2025), Olympic medalist 1968 Summer Olympics and world champion 1969 World Weightlifting Championships
- Sam Davis (1944–2019), offensive guard
- Tug McGraw (1944–2004), MLB pitcher; father of Tim McGraw
- Ron Sellers (born 1947), NFL wide receiver
- Ken Burrough (1948–2022), NFL wide receiver
- Harold Carmichael (born 1949), NFL wide receiver
- Larry Brown (born 1949), NFL tight end
- Ray Nettles (1949–2009), Canadian Football League Hall of Fame linebacker
- Artis Gilmore (born 1949), Hall of Fame basketball player
- Boobie Clark (1949–1988), NFL fullback
- Ed Jenkins (born 1950), NFL wide receiver
- Jack Youngblood (born 1950), NFL Hall-of-Fame defensive end
- Tom Sullivan (1950–2002), NFL running back
- Truck Robinson (born 1951), NBA power forward and coach
- Noah Jackson (born 1951), NFL offensive lineman
- Mark McCumber (born 1951), professional golfer
- Greg Coleman (born 1954), NFL punter
- Ron Meeks (born 1954), CFL player and NFL coach
- Derrick Gaffney (born 1955), NFL wide receiver
- Fred Funk (born 1956), professional golfer
- Terry LeCount (born 1956), NFL wide receiver
- Ron Duguay (1957–2026), NHL player and WHA coach
- Calvin Muhammad (born 1958), NFL wide receiver
- Patty Moise (born 1960), NASCAR driver
- Vince Coleman (born 1961), MLB left fielder
- Glenn Davis (born 1961), MLB first baseman
- "Merciless" Ray Mercer (born 1961), WBO World Heavyweight Champion 1991 and Olympic gold medalist
- Norris Coleman (born 1961), NBA forward
- Nancy Hogshead-Makar (born 1962), national and 1984 Olympic gold medalist swimmer
- Mike Oliphant (born 1963), NFL running back
- Vijay Singh (born 1963), professional golfer
- Bryan Barker (born 1964), NFL punter
- Otis Smith (born 1964), NBA player and GM
- Willie Smith (born 1964), NFL player
- Joel Davis (born 1965), Major League Baseball pitcher
- Alvin Heggs (born 1967), NBA player
- Rena Mero (born 1967), Rena Greek aka "Sable," WWE wrestler and actress
- Rick Wilkins (born 1967), MLB catcher
- Steve Lofton (born 1968), NFL cornerback with four teams
- Chandra Cheeseborough ( born 1969), Olympic Gold Medalist Sprinter, Coach
- James Haley (born 1969), Olympic modern pentathlete
- Gary Alexander (born 1969), basketball player
- Dexter Jackson (born 1969), IFBB pro bodybuilder, 2008 Mr Olympia and nine-time Arnold Classic Champion
- Edgar Bennett (born 1969), NFL running back
- Shawn Jefferson (born 1969), NFL wide receiver and coach
- Martin Lopez Zubero (born 1969), Olympic swimming gold medalist
- Dee Brown (born 1969), NBA player
- Jim Furyk (born 1970), professional golfer
- David Duval (born 1971), professional golfer
- Chipper Jones (born 1972), MLB third baseman
- Nate Campbell (born 1972), professional boxer and lightweight title holder
- Derrick Alexander (born 1973), NFL defensive end
- Brian Dawkins (born 1973), Hall of Fame NFL safety
- Chris Terry (born 1975), NFL center
- Sam Cowart (born 1975), NFL linebacker
- Paul Rigdon (born 1975), MLB pitcher
- Micah Ross (born 1975), NFL wide receiver
- Rahim Abdullah (born 1976), NFL and CFL player
- Travis Tomko (born 1976), "TomKo," TNA professional wrestler
- Ryan Freel (1976–2012), MLB infielder and outfielder
- Michael Burke (born 1977), soccer player and coach
- Laveranues Coles (born 1977), NFL wide receiver
- Rod Gardner (born 1977), NFL wide receiver
- Daniel Hollie (born 1977), WWE professional wrestler
- Lito Sheppard (born 1977), NFL cornerback
- Travis Chapman (born 1978), MLB third baseman
- Elijah Burke (born 1978), TNA professional wrestler
- Roosevelt Williams (born 1978), NFL cornerback
- Travis Taylor (born 1978), wide receiver for six NFL teams
- Matt Lehr (born 1979), guard for six NFL teams
- Khalid Abdullah (born 1979), NFL and CFL linebacker
- Michael Jennings (born 1979), NFL wide receiver
- Chris Barnwell (born 1979), MLB infielder
- Ryan Jorgensen (born 1979), MLB player
- Dez White (born 1979), NFL wide receiver
- Jabar Gaffney (born 1980), NFL wide receiver
- Jonathan Papelbon (born 1980), MLB pitching
- Rashean Mathis (born 1980), NFL cornerback
- Brett Myers (born 1980), MLB relief pitcher
- Ben Nowland (born 1980), Arena Football League player
- Brian Buscher (born 1981), MLB third baseman
- Bubba Dickerson (born 1981), professional golfer
- Amer Delic (born 1982), professional tennis player
- Lionel Gates (born 1982), NFL running back
- Ciatrick Fason (born 1982), NFL running back
- Darren O'Day (born 1982), MLB pitcher
- Guss Scott (born 1982), NFL safety
- Leon Washington (born 1982), NFL running back
- Brian Clark (born 1983), former NFL and CFL wide receiver
- Jamaal Fudge (born 1983), NFL safety
- Howie Kendrick (born 1983), MLB player
- Stephen Nicholas (born 1983), NFL linebacker
- Christian Gaddis (born 1984), NFL center
- Reggie Lewis (born 1984), NFL and CFL cornerback
- Dee Webb (born 1984), NFL cornerback
- Daniel Murphy (born 1985), MLB infielder
- Bobby Cassevah (born 1985), MLB pitcher
- Clarence Denmark (born 1985), NFL and CFL wide receiver
- Marcus Thomas (born 1985), NFL defensive tackle
- Billy Butler (born 1986), MLB player
- Sha'reff Rashad (born 1986), NFL safety
- Tony Carter (born 1986), NFL cornerback
- Derwin Kitchen (born 1986), basketball player
- Josh Sitton (born 1986), NFL offensive guard
- Riley Skinner (born 1986), football quarterback
- Tim Tebow (since age three; born 1987 in the Philippines), 2007 Heisman Trophy winner, Florida Gators, NFL quarterback, former professional baseball player
- Byron Hardmon (born 1981), former University of Florida football player, football coach
- Gerard Ross (born 1987), NFL player
- Jaime Harper (born 1987), football player
- Kelly Kelly (born Barbara Jean Blank in 1987), actress, model, former WWE professional wrestler, former WWE Divas Champion
- Mike Clevinger (born 1990), MLB pitcher
- John Brown (born 1992), basketball player
- Brian Ferlin (born 1992), NHL forward
- Hayden Hurst (born 1993), former University of South Carolina player, NFL tight end, former professional baseball player
- Reggie Northrup (born 1993), former Florida State University linebacker, NFL player, professional MMA fighter
- Ryan Murphy (born 1995), Olympic swimming gold medalist
- Grayson Allen (born 1995), NBA guard
- Zack Bryant (born 1997), Israeli Basketball Premier League point guard
- Bubba Thompson (born 1998), MLB player
- Mac Jones (born 1998), NFL quarterback
- Djordje Mihailovic (born 1998), soccer player and 2024 Olympian
- Nassir Little (born 2000), NBA player

== Entertainers ==
Listed chronologically by year of birth:

- Merian C. Cooper (1893–1973), Hollywood director, producer and writer, King Kong
- Rosalie King-Simpson (1902–1997), stage actress and singer
- Professor Backwards (1910–1976), comedian who made 23 appearances on the Ed Sullivan Show
- Ruth Hall (1910–2003), actress
- William Tuttle (1912–2007), Hollywood makeup artist for over 300 movies and television shows
- Frankie Manning (1914–2009), dancer and choreographer
- Meinhardt Raabe (1915–2010), actor, played the Coroner Munchkin in The Wizard of Oz; resided at Penny Farms Retirement Community
- Dorothy Shay (1921–1978), chanteuse, "The Park Avenue Hillbillie"
- David Jack Holt (1927–2003), child actor, groomed to be the male Shirley Temple
- Wanda Hendrix (1928–1981), actress, married World War II hero Audie Murphy
- Leonard Jackson (1928–2013), actor, starred on PBS shows Sesame Street and Shining Time Station
- Dave Madden (1931–2014), actor, known for starring in the 1970s sitcom The Partridge Family, in which he played the group's manager, Reuben Kincaid
- Paula Kelly (1943–2020), dancer and actress best known for Sweet Charity and The Andromeda Strain
- Gene Deckerhoff (born 1945), the voice of the Tampa Bay Buccaneers and Florida State Seminoles
- Patrika Darbo (born 1948), television actress, Days of Our Lives
- Ken Fallin (born 1948), caricaturist
- Richard Chaves (born 1951), actor, known for playing "Poncho" in Predator
- Henriette Allais (born 1954), model, Playboy Playmate March, 1980
- Michael Emerson (born 1954), film, television, and stage actor
- Rex Smith (born 1955), actor and singer, The Pirates of Penzance
- Linden Ashby (born 1960), actor, known for playing Johnny Cage in Mortal Kombat and Sheriff Noah Stilinski in the MTV series Teen Wolf
- Donna Deegan (born 1962), television news anchor, current mayor of Jacksonville
- Leanza Cornett (1971–2020), 1993 Miss America, television actress
- Al Letson (born 1974), radio host; host of National Public Radio's Reveal
- Nichole Van Croft (1973–2018), model, Playboy Playmate October, 2000
- Kat Candler (born 1974), film writer, producer, and director
- Rahman Johnson (born 1976), radio personality, politician
- Lil Duval (born 1977), comedian
- Jennifer Rovero (born 1978), model, Playboy Playmate July, 1999
- Emily Swallow (born 1979), film and television actor
- Aaron Staton (born 1980), film and television actor
- Daniel Breaker (born 1980), stage actor
- Jessica Morris (born 1980), television actress, One Life to Live
- Yoanna House (born 1980), fashion model, winner of cycle 2 of America's Next Top Model
- Patrick Heusinger (born 1981), film, television, and stage actor
- Tiffany Selby (born 1981), model, Playboy Playmate July, 2007
- Whitney Thompson (born 1987), fashion model, winner of tenth cycle of America's Next Top Model
- Ashley Greene (born 1987), actress, best known as Alice Cullen in Twilight
- Ned Fulmer (born 1987), YouTuber, ex-host of The Try Guys
- RJ Cyler (born 1995), actor
- Brittany Chrishawn Moore (born 199?), film producer, screen writer, human rights activist
- Tyriq Withers (born 1998), film and television actor, former YouTuber

== Musicians and composers ==
Listed chronologically by year of birth:

- Frederick Delius (1862–1934), English composer, wrote Florida Suite; studied music in Jacksonville, lived nearby
- John Rosamond Johnson (1873–1954), musical composer, brother of James Weldon
- Blind Blake (1896–1934), influential blues guitarist
- George Paxton (1914–1989), big band jazz leader, saxophonist, composer, producer
- Billy Daniels (1915–1988), big band singer, actor
- Jackie Davis (Benjamin Jackson Porter 'Jackie' Davis) (1920-1999), Hammond jazz organist, singer, actor (Caddy Shack), international entertainer
- Samuel Jones (1924–1981), jazz bassist and cellist
- Ray Charles (1930–2004), blind, soulful singer
- Luther Dixon (1931–2009), record producer and songwriter
- Jack Sheldon (1931–2019), bebop and West Coast jazz trumpeter, singer and actor
- Pat Boone (born 1934), popular 1950s singer, actor and teen idol
- Nick Todd (1935–2023), pop singer
- Jo Ann Campbell (born 1938), country and pop singer, actress
- Johnny Tillotson (1938–2025), pop singer, songwriter, actor
- Scott McKenzie (1939–2012), rock and roll singer
- Gary U.S. Bonds (born 1939), R&B singer
- Alan Jabbour (1939–2017), old-time fiddler and folklorist
- J.R. Cobb (1944–2019), guitarist and songwriter; member of Classics IV and Atlanta Rhythm Section
- Jackie Moore (1946–2019), R&B singer
- Claude "Butch" Trucks (1947–2017), drummer of Allman Brothers Band
- Ronnie Van Zant (1948–1977), singer-songwriter, founder of Southern rock band Lynyrd Skynyrd
- Rick Dees (born 1950), radio disc jockey, recorded novelty hit "Disco Duck"
- Danny Joe Brown (1951–2005), songwriter and former singer for the band Molly Hatchet
- Gary Rossington (1951–2023), guitarist, songwriter and founding member of Southern rock band Lynyrd Skynyrd
- Allen Collins (1952–1990), guitarist, songwriter and founding member of Southern rock band Lynyrd Skynyrd
- Donnie Van Zant (born 1952), lead singer of Southern rock band .38 Special
- Johnny Van Zant (born 1959), lead vocalist for Lynyrd Skynyrd since reforming in 1987
- Glenn Jones (born 1962), R&B and gospel singer
- Marcus Roberts (born 1963), jazz pianist, composer, arranger, bandleader, and teacher
- Vic Chesnutt (1964–2009), folk rock singer-songwriter
- Fred Durst (born 1970), lead singer, founder of Nu metal band Limp Bizkit
- James MacDonough (born 1970), former Iced Earth and Megadeth bass player
- Greg Eklund (born 1970), drummer of Everclear
- Scooter Ward (born 1970), singer, founder of post-grunge/alternative metal band Cold
- Jeremy Marshall (born 1971), bassist for the band Cold
- Terry Balsamo (born 1972), lead guitar for the band Evanescence
- Rogue (born 1972), lead singer for the goth/electropop band The Crüxshadows
- Kelly Hayes (born 1973), lead guitarist for the band Cold
- Scott Borland (born 1977), former keyboard player for the band Limp Bizkit
- Sam Rivers (1977–2025), bass player for the band Limp Bizkit
- Sam McCandless (born 1978), drummer for the band Cold
- Ryan Key (born 1979), lead singer of the punk rock band Yellowcard
- Derek Trucks (born 1979), child prodigy on guitar, member of Allman Brothers Band and Derek Trucks Band
- Ben Cooper (born 1982), singer-songwriter, Electric President and Radical Face
- Shannon Wright, singer-songwriter
- Asia Cruise (born 1990), contemporary R&B singer
- YK Osiris (born 1998), singer-songwriter
- Julio Foolio (1998–2024), rapper
- Yungeen Ace (born 1998), rapper
- Nardo Wick (born 2001), rapper
- SpotemGottem (born 2001), rapper

Listed chronologically by year the band was formed:

- Classics IV (1965), pop rock
- The Allman Brothers Band (1969), Southern rock
- Lynyrd Skynyrd (1970), Southern rock
- Blackfoot (1972), rock/Southern rock
- Molly Hatchet (1975), Southern rock
- .38 Special (1975), rock
- 69 Boyz (1993), hip hop
- Limp Bizkit (1994), nu-metal
- Inspection 12 (1994), pop punk
- Quad City DJ's (1995), hip hop
- Cold (1996), post-grunge
- Yellowcard (1997), pop punk
- Swirl 360 (1998), pop rock
- Skyliner (2000), power metal
- Burn Season (2001), hard rock
- Evergreen Terrace (2001), melodic hardcore
- JJ Grey & Mofro (2001), southern rock, blues, soul
- Shinedown (2001), rock
- Greyfield (2001), pop punk
- Whole Wheat Bread (2003), punk rock
- Casey Jones (2003), hardcore
- Electric President (2003), indie/electronic
- Radical Face (2003), experimental/folk/indie
- The Red Jumpsuit Apparatus (2003), rock
- Astronautalis (2003), hip hop
- The Summer Obsession (2006), pop rock
- Black Kids (2006), indie rock
- Fit For Rivals (2008), rock
- Tedeschi Trucks Band (2010), rock, blues rock, blues, soul
- The Black Pine (2014), indie/alternative rock

== Serial killers ==
Listed chronologically by year of birth:

- Henry Lee Lucas (1936–2001), serial killer
- George Ronald York (1943–1965), executed spree killer
- Paul John Knowles (1946–1974), serial killer nicknamed the "Casanova Killer"
- Ottis Toole (1947–1996), serial killer and probable murderer of Adam Walsh
- Paul Durousseau (born 1970), serial killer nicknamed the "Killer Cabbie"

== Fictional characters ==
- Olivia Dunham, protagonist of the FOX series Fringe
- Jason Mendoza, a principal character in the NBC series The Good Place
