= Hurricane Dora (1964) =

Category 4 Atlantic hurricane in 1964

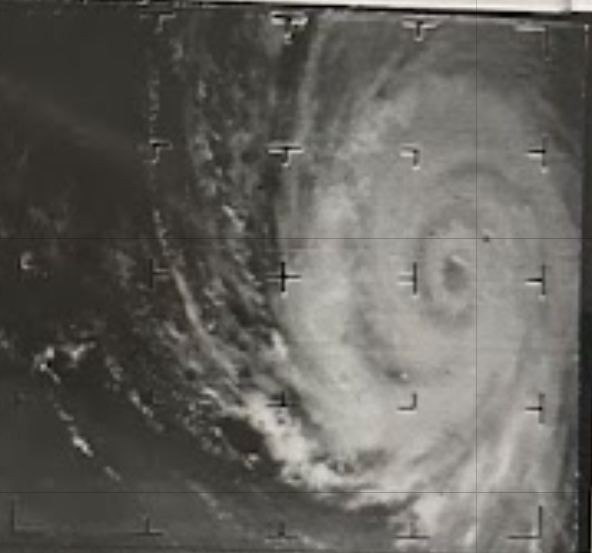
- Satellite image of Dora on September 6th

Meteorological history
- Formed: August 28, 1964
- Extratropical: September 13, 1964
- Dissipated: September 15, 1964

Category 4 major hurricane
- 1-minute sustained (SSHWS/NWS)
- Highest winds: 130 mph (215 km/h)
- Lowest pressure: 942 mbar (hPa); 27.82 inHg

Overall effects
- Fatalities: 5 total
- Damage: $280 million (1964 USD)
- Areas affected: Bahamas, East Coast of the United States (especially Florida), Atlantic Canada
- IBTrACS
- Part of the 1964 Atlantic hurricane season

Hurricane Dora was the first tropical cyclone on record to make landfall over the Atlantic coast of North Florida at hurricane intensity. The sixth tropical storm and second hurricane of the 1964 season, Dora developed from a tropical wave near the coast of Senegal on August 28. The depression intensified into Tropical Storm Dora late on August 31. It then curved northwestward and continued to strengthen. By late on September 2, Dora became a Category 1 hurricane. Intensification slowed somewhat, with Dora becoming a Category 2 hurricane on September 4 and then a Category 3 hurricane the following day. Deepening further, the storm briefly peaked as a Category 4 with maximum sustained winds of 130 mph (215 km/h) on September 6. Dora soon weakened to a Category 3 hurricane and then a Category 2 hurricane while curving westward early the following day.

Dora maintained Category 2 intensity over the next few days, except for several hours on September 9. While approaching the northeast coast of Florida, Dora's motion became erratic, making a few cyclonic loops. Early on September 10, the hurricane made landfall near St. Augustine, Florida, with winds of 110 mph (175 km/h). Dora quickly weakened to tropical storm intensity over land on September 11 and then briefly drifted over southwestern Georgia, until turning northeastward later the next day. Upon merging with a cold front, Dora became extratropical cyclone over coastal South Carolina on September 13. Early on September 14, the extratropical storm emerged into the Atlantic Ocean over the Outer Banks of North Carolina and accelerated, striking Newfoundland on September 15 before being absorbed by another extratropical system.

Along the First Coast of Florida, tides reached up to 10 ft (3 m) above mean sea level. Strong winds lashed the region, with sustained wind of 125 mph (200 km/h) observed in St. Augustine. In Jacksonville, approximately 156,000 customers lost power, while about 19% of phones in Duval County were out of service. Much of the damage in the Jacksonville area occurred to older buildings and those located in coastal areas. Additionally, sections of the city experienced wind-induced river flooding in the vicinity of the St. Johns River. Heavy rainfall damaged many unharvested crops and inundated numerous roads and bridges, isolated some communities for several days. Throughout Florida, Dora demolished 74 dwellings and damaged 9,374 others, while 14 mobile homes were destroyed and 218 others suffered severe impact. About 50 farm buildings and 423 small businesses suffered major damage or destruction. Three deaths and at least $230 million in damage occurred. In Georgia, the storm damaged about 1,135 homes and obliterated 5 others. Additionally, 18 trailers suffered major impact, while 43 small businesses were destroyed or experienced severe damage. The state reported one death and at least $9 million in damage. Dora impacted a few other states the East Coast of the United States, but to a much lesser degree. One death occurred in Virginia. Overall, Dora caused $280 million in damage, which is equivalent to $2.6 billion in 2022 USD, and five deaths.

== Meteorological history ==
Map plotting the storm's track and intensity, according to the Saffir–Simpson scale Map key Saffir–Simpson scale Tropical depression (≤38 mph, ≤62 km/h) Tropical storm (39–73 mph, 63–118 km/h) Category 1 (74–95 mph, 119–153 km/h) Category 2 (96–110 mph, 154–177 km/h) Category 3 (111–129 mph, 178–208 km/h) Category 4 (130–156 mph, 209–251 km/h) Category 5 (≥157 mph, ≥252 km/h) Unknown Storm type Tropical cyclone Subtropical cyclone Extratropical cyclone, remnant low, tropical disturbance, or monsoon depression

Hurricane Dora was first identified as a broad area of low pressure on August 28, 1964, that moved off the west coast of Africa into the Atlantic Ocean near Dakar, Senegal. Traveling west-southwestward, the system brushed the Cape Verde Islands on the next day. By August 31, images from the eighth Television Infrared Observation Satellite (TIROS VIII) depicted a developing storm with a central dense overcast, banding features and cirrus outflow. Observations from ship Mormacscan, which passed closest to the storm, indicated decreasing barometric pressures and wind gusts up to 40 mph (65 km/h). As part of a review of the cyclone during the Atlantic hurricane reanalysis project in 2019, the depression intensified into Tropical Storm Dora around 18:00 UTC on August 31. This was based on an extrapolation of reconnaissance aircraft flight data on September 1, which observed sustained winds of 59 mph (95 km/h). Shortly thereafter, the Weather Bureau in San Juan, Puerto Rico, issued the first advisory on the storm, with the center estimated to be roughly 850 mi (1,370 km) east of Trinidad.

After advisories began on September 1, Dora turned northwestward and continued to intensify. Several reconnaissance missions into the storm indicated that it attained hurricane status during the afternoon of September 2, which the official Atlantic hurricane database lists as 18:00 UTC. Although contemporary reports indicated that Dora quickly became a major hurricane, the 2019 reanalysis of Dora concluded that remained a Category 1 hurricane on the modern-day Saffir–Simpson hurricane scale until late on September 4 and did not intensify into a Category 3 hurricane until about 24 hours thereafter.

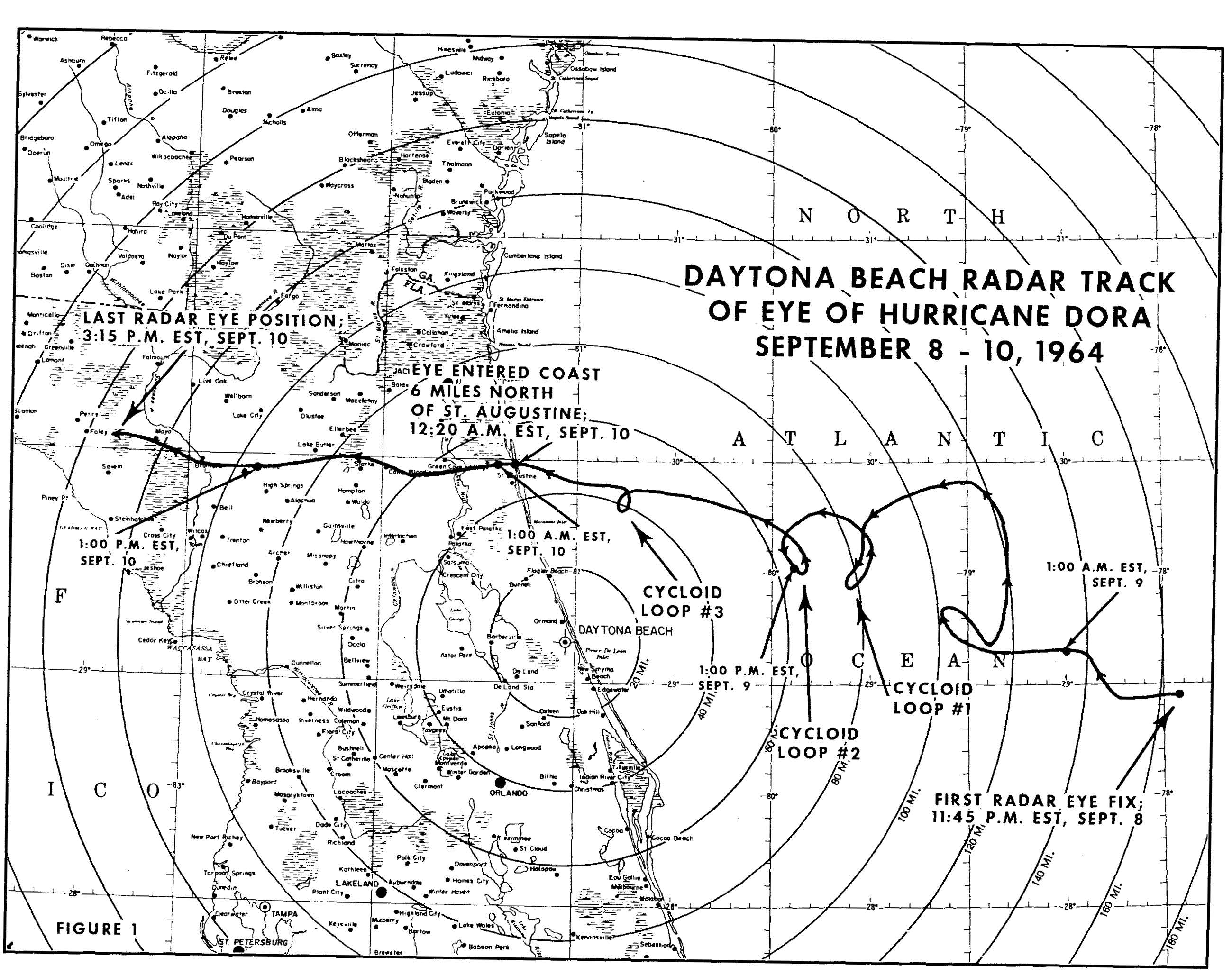
Enlarged track of Hurricane Dora detailing its erratic track prior to landfall

At the time, meteorologists expected the storm to maintain a northwesterly course and be steered over open waters by a trough associated with Hurricane Cleo to the west. However, Dora avoided the trough and instead gradually turned westward September 6. That day, the hurricane attained its peak intensity as a Category 4-equivalent storm with winds estimated at 130 mph (215 km/h) and a minimum atmospheric pressure of 942 mbar (27.82 inHg). While executing the turn, Dora steadily weakened as its low-level inflow was disrupted, falling to Category 3 intensity around 12:00 UTC on September 6 and then to Category 2 status by early the next day. While initially thought to have re-intensified into a Category 3 hurricane on September 8, the 2019 reanalysis on Dora indicated that the storm remained no stronger than a Category 2 hurricane for the remainder of its duration.

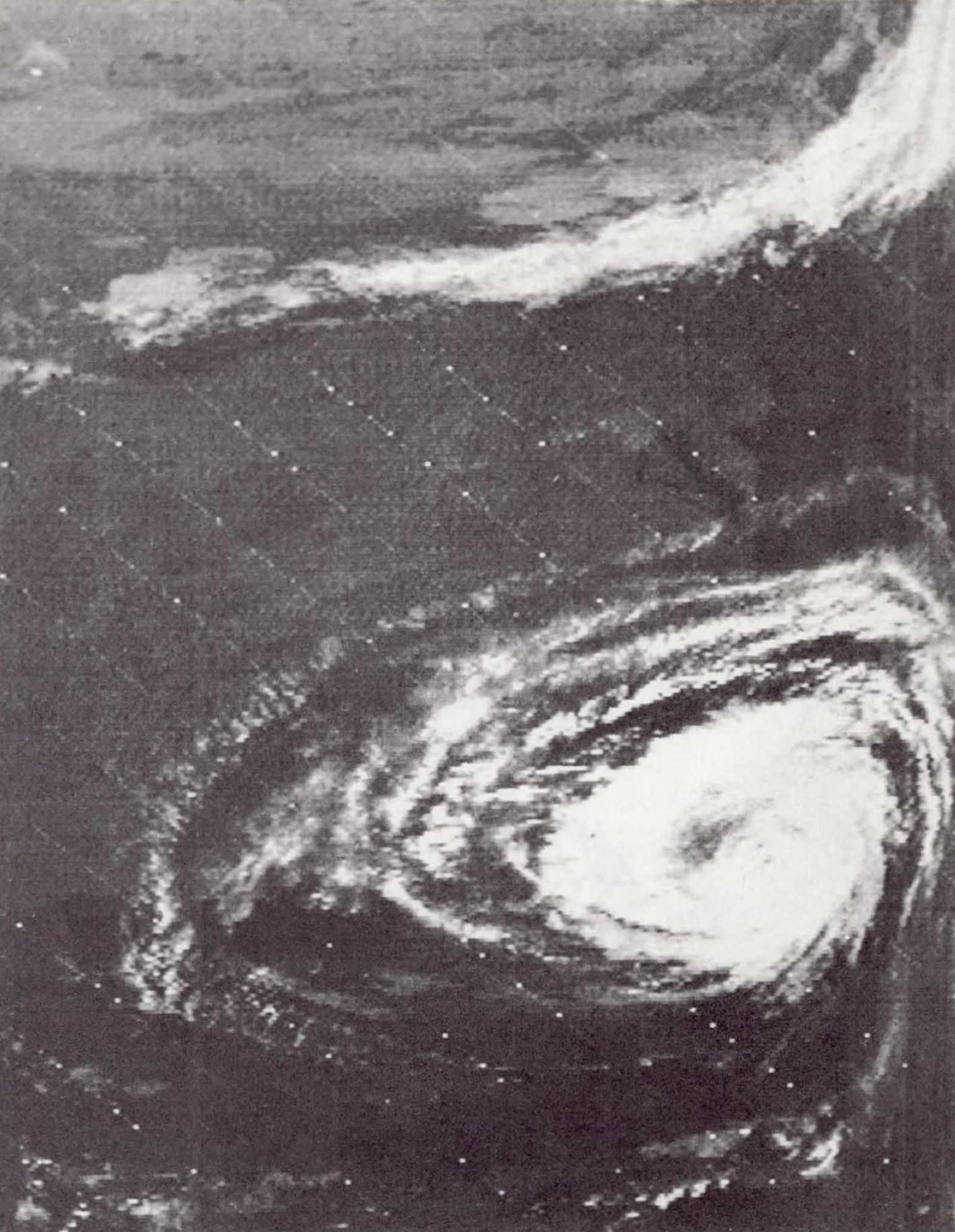
Nimbus 1 Satellite image on September 9, showing Hurricane Dora approaching the east coast of Florida

Tracking westward towards Florida, Dora's forward movement decreased and became erratic as it neared the coast. Early on September 9, the storm abruptly turned southeastward before moving north for several hours. Throughout the remainder of the day, Dora executed three distinct cyclonic loops while maintaining a general westward motion. The cyclone weakened to a Category 1 hurricane intensity early on September 9, possibly due to an eyewall replacement cycle, but re-strengthened into a Category 2 hurricane at 18:00 UTC while passing over the Gulf Stream. This resulted in its central pressure decreasing 9 mbar (hPa; 0.27 inHg) in a few hours. As Dora neared North Florida in the early hours of September 10, the diameter of its eye decreased from about 28 mi to 8 mi (44 to 13 km). Around 06:00 UTC on September 10, the storm made landfall near St. Augustine, as a strong Category 2 hurricane with sustained winds of 110 mph (175 km/h). Dora became the only hurricane to strike the First Coast region during the 20th century. The cyclone quickly weakened after moving ashore, losing hurricane status within 12 hours, and turned to the north just west of Tallahassee on September 11. Early on the following day, Dora briefly became almost stationary over southwest Georgia, before a cold front caused it to accelerate northeastward. Dora also began merging with the cold front, leading to its transition into an extratropical cyclone over coastal South Carolina around 12:00 UTC on September 13. The extratropical remnants emerged into the Atlantic along the Outer Banks of North Carolina early the following day and continued northeastward, striking Newfoundland late on September 15, shortly before being absorbed by another extratropical system.

== Preparations ==
=== Caribbean ===
Upon Dora's classification on September 1, a small craft advisory was issued for the Leeward Islands and the northern Windward Islands.

=== United States ===
As Dora approached Florida, gale warnings were issued for the northeast section of the coastline. As Dora moved inland, gale warnings were issued from Sarasota to Pensacola. In addition, small craft for much of the Gulf Coast to the west coast of Florida, and later in the Mid-Atlantic were advised to remain in port until the storm subsided.

== Impact ==
=== Leeward Islands ===
The storm remained far enough from the Leeward Islands to cause little impact. On Saint Kitts, sustained winds reached 23 mph (37 km/h) and gusts peaked at 32 mph (51 km/h). Additionally, the United States' Weather Bureau office in San Juan, Puerto Rico, noted that "some slight erosion of beaches may have occurred due to heavy surf on September 3 and 4."

=== United States ===
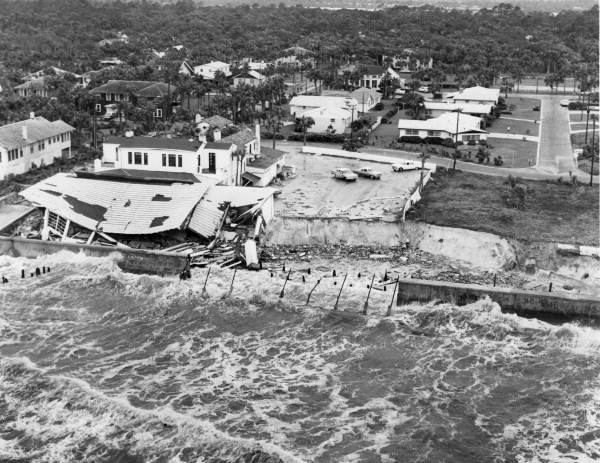
Damage caused by storm surge in Atlantic Beach

Overall, Dora was responsible for five deaths and $280 million in damage in the United States, much of which occurred in Florida. Within Florida and Georgia combined, the hurricane injured nearly 1,500 persons, with 72 of those people requiring hospitalization. Dora demolished at least 79 dwellings, 14 trailers, 2 farm buildings, and destroyed or severely damaged 205 boats and 466 small businesses. Additionally, Dora rendered major damage to at least 492 residences, 236 trailers, and 48 farm buildings, as well as minor damage to 10,017 residences. Approximately 13,476 families in the two states experienced losses relating to the storm.

==== Florida ====
Along the coast of Florida, tides reached up to 10 ft (3.0 m) above mean sea level. The hurricane also produced storm surge and abnormally high tides on the Gulf Coast of Florida, especially from Tampa Bay to St. Marks, where tides between 2 and 6 ft (0.61 and 1.83 m) were observed. Residents were forced to evacuate their homes. Strong winds lashed northeastern Florida, with sustained wind of 125 mph (200 km/h) observed in St. Augustine. Many locations north of Daytona Beach received sustained winds of at least 100 mph (160 km/h). Because of the slow movement of Dora, some places experienced the worst of the storm for as much as 24 hours. Many areas of North Florida received at least 10 in (250 mm) of rainfall, damaging many unharvested crops and inundating numerous roads and bridges, which isolated some communities for several days. Throughout Florida, 74 dwellings were flattened and 9,374 received damage, while 14 mobile homes were destroyed and 218 others suffered severe impact. About 50 farm buildings and 423 small businesses were severely damaged or demolished.

===== First Coast =====
Jacksonville was one of the most severely impacted cities. Approximately 156,000 customers were left without electricity, while about 19% of phones in Duval County were out of service. The power supply for Jacksonville and surrounding towns was lost for six days. Much of the damage in the Jacksonville area occurred to older buildings and those located in coastal areas. Additionally, sections of the city experienced wind-induced river flooding in the vicinity of the St. Johns River. Along the coast, Atlantic Beach and Jacksonville Beach were lashed by storm surge, which flooded low-lying areas and swept away houses and roads. One street in the latter was inundated with about 6 ft (1.8 m) of water. Three homes were destroyed and 3,992 suffered damage, while 5 mobile homes were demolished and 25 experienced impact, overall in Duval County.

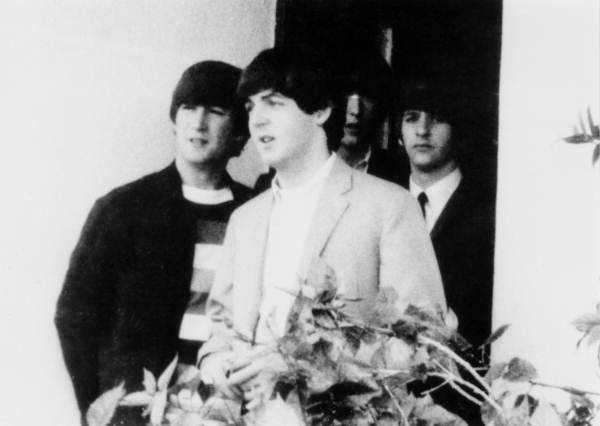
The Beatles at their hotel in Key West

The storm was also one of the factors that nearly led to the cancellation of a Beatles concert at Gator Bowl Stadium in Jacksonville on September 11; other reasons included that the Beatles would not perform with a segregated audience, the American Guild of Variety Artists forced the Fab Four to pay union dues, and that a group of filmmakers attempted to create bootleg footage of the concert. Those issues were eventually resolved. Initially, the Beatles planned to fly to Jacksonville after their concert in Montreal on September 8, but the storm forced their plane to be diverted to Key West. Just hours before the concert began, the Beatles arrived at Imeson Field. More than 20,000 fans attended the concert, though thousands of others could not attend due to power outages in the city. Because winds were still gusting up to 45 mph (72 km/h), Ringo Starr's drums were nailed to the stage.

In American Beach, which was once an African-American beach community established by Abraham Lincoln Lewis, many of its historical buildings were damaged or destroyed. Additionally, several homes and businesses were also affected or demolished. Some homes were swept away in Fernandina Beach, while the foundations of several other dwellings were threatened. Approximately 40 residences were damaged or destroyed. At Fort Clinch, located near the northern tip of Amelia Island, the exterior of the fort was severely impacted by erosion. Throughout Nassau County, Dora destroyed about 50 homes and damaged 500 others, while 25 small businesses were either demolished or suffered major impact.

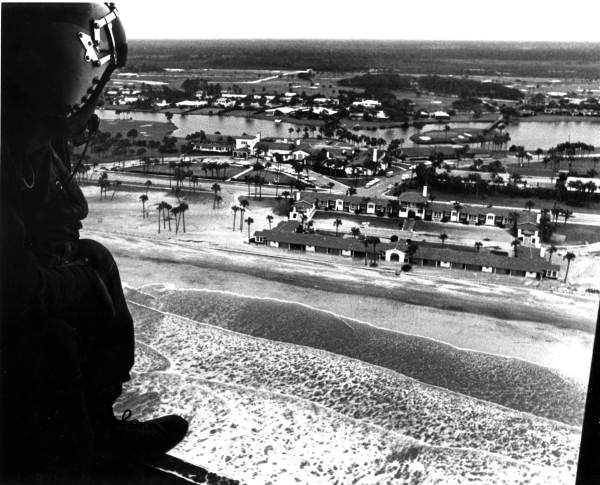
Aerial view of Ponte Vedra Beach

In St. Johns County, 14 beach homes and 2 car garages were destroyed by erosion between Vilano Beach and southern Ponte Vedra Beach. A number of other dwellings were damaged. Waves inundated many areas of St. Augustine with a few inches to as much as several feet of water. The heaviest impact occurred at the bay front, in Davis Shores, and along the San Sebastian River. At Slave Market Square, floodwaters were "hip deep", while floodwaters outside the Monson Motor Lodge was described as "hubcap deep". The St. Augustine Record office was submerged, while some motel lobbies along the Matanzas River were flooded with 30 in (760 mm) of water. Additionally, Castillo de San Marcos was surrounded by water. Winds unroofed some homes and downed giant, centuries old oak trees. Much of the city was left without electricity. Damage in St. Augustine totaled about $5 million. The pier and boardwalk at St. Augustine Beach were majorly damaged, as well as a section of State Road A1A, causing it to be closed to traffic. Approximately 1,027 homes and 19 others were destroyed, while 20 businesses suffered major losses or were demolished in St. Johns County alone.

High tides were also reported Flagler County, especially at Flagler Beach. About half of the municipal pier was destroyed, with some of its debris scattered over State Road A1A. In addition to the debris, washouts forced the road to be temporarily closed. Impact to private property was mainly limited to lost shingles, flooded yards, and a few downed trees. Seedling cabbage plants may have been completely ruined. Damage in the county was minor, reaching approximately $500,000. Tides of about 8 ft (2.4 m) along the St. Johns River in Palatka threatened to wash away the eastern side of the memorial bridge. Extensive erosion occurred elsewhere in Putnam County along the river. A 75 ft (23 m) yacht was beached at a county commissioner's riverfront home. Then-State Road 309 was flooded in the vicinity of Georgetown. Some trees were downed and a few classrooms suffered water leaks at St. Johns River Junior College in Palatka, but damage overall was minor. Approximately 1,800 people were left without telephone service in Palatka, Pomona Park, and Welaka.

===== Interior North Florida and Florida Panhandle =====
West of the Jacksonville area, the storm brought heavy rainfall, with over 10 in (250 mm) of precipitation falling in a 10,000 sq mi (26,000 km^{2}) area. In Bradford County, impacts from Dora included major damage to 2 homes and 15 farm buildings and minor damage to 18 homes, as well as significant damage or destruction to 1 small business. Eight dwellings in Union County experienced minor damage. Columbia and Hamilton counties reported minor damage to 30 homes in the former and 5 homes in the latter. In Madison County, 18 homes suffered minor damage. In Taylor County, the city of Perry was flooded, with water entering more than 100 homes. As a result, an estimated 500 people fled the town. Farther south, freshwater flooding and storm surge affected Steinhatchee. High water left State Road 51 – the only highway to and from Steinhatchee – closed for a few days. Throughout Taylor County, the storm damaged 300 homes to some degree, 25 severely. A total of 30 mobile homes suffered major impact. Additionally, 10 small businesses and 30 boats experienced major damage or destruction.

Civil defense authorities ordered evacuations for people residing along a 50–65 mi (80–105 km) stretch of the Suwannee River. Precipitation from the hurricane peaked at 23.73 in (603 mm) in Mayo, including 14.62 in (371 mm) that fell in a 24‑hour period. Consequently, flooding inundated many roads in Lafayette County, including U.S. Route 27 and State Road 51, causing school sessions to be canceled for several days. Much of the town of Mayo was inundated. Thirteen homes were damaged in the county, while four mobile homes received major impacts. Flooding in Cross City impacted businesses, homes, and roads, causing approximately 200 families to evacuate. Damage in the city totaled about $2 million. Throughout Dixie County, Dora inflicted major damage on one trailer and two dwellings and minor damage on one hundred other dwellings. Ten boats also received substantial impacts or were destroyed. Neighboring Levy County reported significant impacts to one home and four trailers, as well as minor impacts to twelve homes.

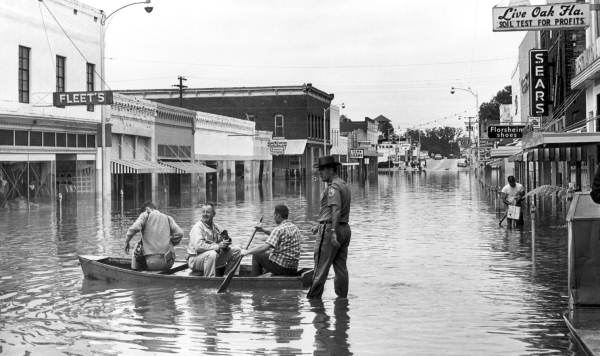
Flooding in Live Oak

At Live Oak, 18.62 in (473 mm) of precipitation was observed over the course of four days, forcing 300–400 households to evacuate. Flooding left the town almost completely isolated, with all highways leading into Live Oak closed. Portions of the downtown business district became inundated with more than 10 ft (3.0 m) of water, while floodwaters may have reached as high as 30 ft (9.1 m) above ground in parts of the town. Some homes floated away, while others were flooded with water above their second-story windows. In a few neighborhoods, only the tops of the chimneys remained visible, while many residents became stranded on their rooftops and required rescue by boats. The storm also interfered with the operation of local sewage plants, although the mayor noted that the water supply remained potable. One person died directly as a result of the storm from a drowning in Live Oak. Throughout Suwannee County, 100 homes suffered major damage, while 219 other dwellings experienced minor damage and 5 mobile homes received severe impacts. Additionally, seven farm buildings were extensively damaged and 80 small businesses suffered either destruction or significant effects.

Dozens of dwellings and 25 homes at Highland Court Manor and Lincoln Estates were invaded by water in Gainesville. Several residences on Northwest 10th Avenue also flooded. In Gainesville, Florida, Hogtown Creek flooded and many homes in surrounding neighborhoods, including Woodland Terrace and Gold Club Manor experienced flooding that lasted for days. Along with the flooding, power was lost for a long while. while another 25 dwellings experienced water damage in High Springs after the Santa Fe River overflowed. A trailer park on Archer Road was inundated waist-deep. At Clear Lake, the rising body of water threatened several homes. A 25,000 US gal (95,000 L; 21,000 imp gal) fuel tank at Stengel Field emerged from the ground due to saturation. At the University of Florida, the half-basements of Anderson, Flint, Matherly, and Tigert halls were flooded, though classes remained in session while crews pumped out the water. Throughout the city, saturation downed trees, some of which fell on power lines, roads, and houses. Damage in Gainesville alone exceeded $300,000. Overall, the storm damaged 225 dwellings and 36 mobile homes in Alachua County, while 4 businesses received major damage or were destroyed.

In Ocala, 11.7 in (300 mm) of rain fell since September 1, about 11.46 in (291 mm) in association with Dora. A few blocks were closed in the city due to flooding. One lane along Route 441 was inundated at Orange Lake. Throughout Marion County, flooding submerged 15 to 20 county roads. Additionally, Interstate 75 was flooded between Route 27 and County Road 318, resulting in the closure of that section of the highway. The storm inflicted minor damage on 18 homes and severe impacts on 8 other residences in Marion County. In Citrus County, nearly everyone evacuated from the small community of Homosassa, where about 900 people lost electricity. Floodwaters in the town of Crystal River reached 4 in (0.10 m) deep inside city hall, while the Port Paradise Hotel reported about 4 ft (1.2 m) of water in its lobby.

===== Central Florida southward =====
In New Smyrna Beach, two concrete decks at the beach were swept away. More than 200 ft (61 m) of sand was lost at the Coast Guard station. Strong winds downed power lines and trees, which struck six homes. Sixty-three dwellings in Daytona Beach were damaged and over 1,000 sq ft (93 m^{2}) of the roof at Daytona Beach International Airport was lost. One house burned down in Glenwood, a community between DeLeon Springs and DeLand, after the owner forgot to extinguish a kerosene lantern before falling asleep. In DeLand, winds uprooted many trees and caused power and telephone service outages. The winds and rainfall ranging from 6 to 7 in (150 to 180 mm) caused some losses of oranges and grapefruits. A total of 5 homes experienced significant damage in Orange City, while 8 other suffered light impacts. In western Volusia County, one dwelling was destroyed and twenty-nine suffered major impact, while one hundred twenty-seven homes experienced minor damage. Additionally, 15 trailers were significantly impacted. The hurricane destroyed 1 home, caused major damage to 19 homes, and inflicted minor damage to 397 homes in eastern Volusia County. Also in that section of the county, 5 mobile homes experienced substantial damage and 12 boats were either destroyed or severely damaged.

In Seminole County, wind damage was mainly limited a to downed power lines, electrical poles, and trees, some of which fell on homes and blocked streets, particularly in Altamonte Springs, Geneva, and Sanford. Two deaths occurred on September 9 when a helicopter being evacuated from the storm crashed near Sanford, killing two Navy personnel. Throughout Seminole County, 461 homes suffered minor damage and 8 mobile homes received minor damage. Additionally, 26 farm buildings were severely damaged and 12 boats were either extensively damaged or destroyed. In Brevard County, the storm caused minor flood damage to homes in Titusville. A few power lines and telephone lines were downed by the wind. A loss of 10% of grapefruit crops and 2%–3% of oranges in the county. Throughout southern Brevard County, Dora caused major damage to 4 homes and minor damage to 24 others. The cyclone also destroyed 4 mobile homes and inflicted major damage to 14 others. Additionally, 10 small businesses were either demolished or received extensive damage. In Indian River County, a total of 45 homes suffered light damage. Farther south, storm surge and above normal tides caused the loss of about 10 to 12 ft (3.0 to 3.7 m) of sand in Fort Pierce. Winds in the area left some power outages and toppled a steel, concrete sign at a courthouse.

==== Georgia ====
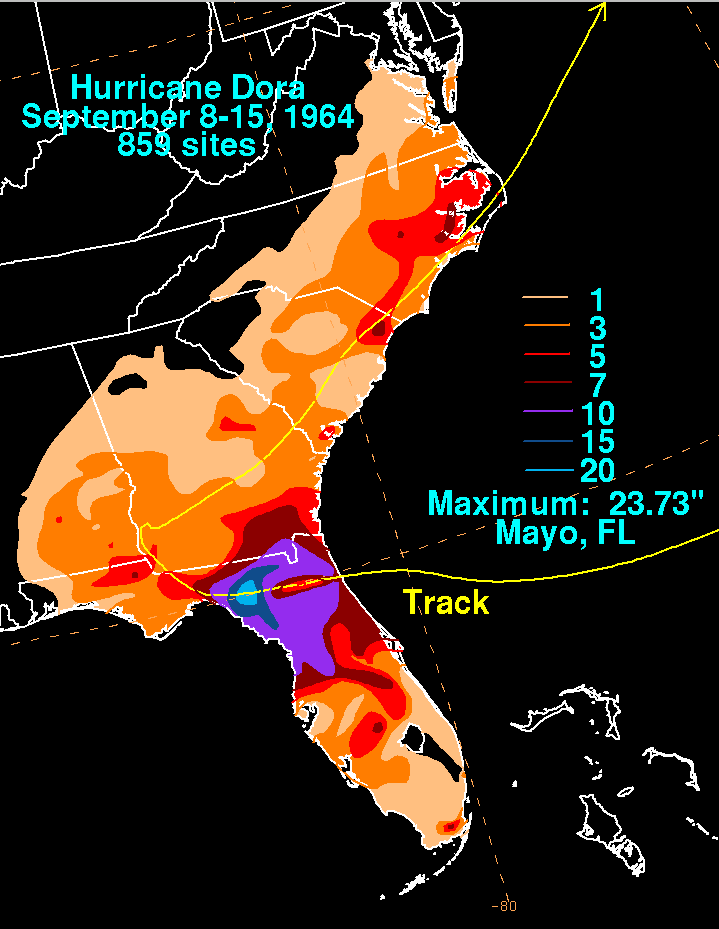
Map of rainfall from Hurricane Dora in the Southeastern United States

Some locations in Georgia also experienced hurricane-force winds and heavy rainfall from the storm, particularly in the southeastern portion of the state. Winds estimated at 90 mph (140 km/h) were experienced on the coastal islands, while gale-force winds were observed as far north as Savannah and as far west as Waycross. Hundreds of trees were toppled, which downed trees and power lines, with some areas experiencing a near complete loss of electricity. The storm also brought heavy rainfall, with some areas observing more than 10 in (250 mm) of rain, while much of the southern half of Georgia experienced more than 3 in (76 mm) of precipitation. Storm surge and higher tides resulted in erosion and coastal flooding. On Jekyll Island, two motels lost portions of their roofs and a ferris wheel was destroyed. Extensive erosion also occurred on the island. Damage on Jekyll Island was conservatively estimated at $1 million. At least five homes were swept away on St. Simons Island, while sections of the pier and seawall were demolished. The F.J. Torras Causeway, a bridge connecting Sea Island and St. Simons Island to Brunswick, was flooded.

Many streets in Brunswick were covered with 1 to 3 ft (0.30 to 0.91 m) of water, leaving them impassible. In one section of the city, about 100 homes were deroofed, while 25 other homes in another section were severely damaged. An estimated 35%-40% of dwellings were damaged to some degree in Brunswick. Many trees, and power lines were downed, limiting communication between the islands and the mainland to radio networks. Portions of Route 17 south of Brunswick was washed out. One man drowned in the Little Satilla River near Brunswick while attempting to secure his boat. Glynn County suffered over $3.6 million in damage. Soil erosion caused by heavy rainfall in Waycross resulted in extensive damage to buildings and streets. Throughout Georgia, the storm structurally impacted about 1,135 homes and obliterated five others. Additionally, 18 trailers suffered major impact, while 43 small businesses were destroyed or experienced severe damage. Although many pastures were flooded, impact on agriculture was minor. Overall, the storm left at least $9 million in damage in Georgia.

=== Elsewhere in North America ===
Winds and rains generated by Dora in South Carolina damaged some utility lines in the vicinity of Columbia. Gale-force winds in the Charleston metropolitan area damaged some buildings and home and uprooted trees. Much of Horry County observed at least 5 in (130 mm) of precipitation, including a peak total of 8.25 in (210 mm) in Conway. Floods swept away a small home in the city. Several streams overflowed between Conway and Loris, which destroyed a small bridge. Offshore, the storm spawned three or four waterspouts to the southwest of Myrtle Beach. In North Carolina, heavy rainfall in the northeastern portions of the state left a beachfront highway inaccessible for about 48 hours and caused water damage in several coastal homes. Winds left sporadic damage, including to corn crops. A tornado in Brunswick County destroyed two homes and damaged four homes, a boat, and a boat trailer.

Rains produced by the storm in Virginia caused flooding in Norfolk, inundating low-lying roads. Norfolk Municipal Airport also closed due to floodwaters along the roads leading to it. One indirect death occurred there due to a person suffering a heart attack while attempting to secure a boat Flooding in the Buckroe Beach neighborhood of Hampton, causing about 40 residents to evacuate to Kecoughtan High School, while winds downed trees and power lines. On Assateague Island, which is split between Virginia and Maryland, steady rainfall for approximately 36 hours left about 2 ft (0.61 m) of water on intersections at lower elevations.

The remnants of Dora dropped about 2 to 3 in (51 to 76 mm) of precipitation along the Atlantic coast of Nova Scotia. In Newfoundland, over 100 ships sought shelter at the St. John's harbor. The central portions of the province experienced heavy rainfall and winds up to 59 mph (95 km/h).

== Aftermath ==
Following the storm, President Lyndon Johnson toured the devastated area with Florida governor Farris Bryant, U.S. senators Spessard Holland and George Smathers, Jacksonville mayor and Democratic nominee for governor Haydon Burns. President Johnson also personally assessed the damage in coastal Georgia, including at Brunswick and St. Simons Island. In the flooded areas, the Red Cross delivered typhoid serum by helicopter.

The name "Dora" had replaced "Donna" on the hurricane lists, and it was retired from the Atlantic hurricane lists and replaced with "Dolly" for the 1968 season.

== See also ==
- 1898 Georgia hurricane
- List of retired Atlantic hurricane names
- List of Florida hurricanes (1950–1974)
