= Central Life Insurance Company of Florida =

American company (1922–1991)

- Formerly: Central Life Insurance Co., Central Life Insurance Company of Tampa
- Company type: Private
- Industry: Insurance
- Founded: 1922
- Founder: Mary McLeod Bethune, George Schroeder Middleton, L. A. Howell, T. L. Lowrie, S. J. Johnson, C. H. Norton, W. D. Potter
- Defunct: August 27, 1991
- Fate: Involuntarily dissolved
- Headquarters: 400 North Boulevard, Tampa, Florida, U.S.

Central Life Insurance Company of Florida (1922 – 1991) was an American insurance company founded by prominent African Americans in Tampa, Florida, U.S.. Established during the Jim Crow era of segregation and discrimination, the company loaned money to Black–owned businesses.

== History ==
Company founders included Mary McLeod Bethune, George Schroeder Middleton, L. A. Howell, T. L. Lowrie, S. J. Johnson, C. H. Norton (dentist), and W. D. Potter. Bethune served as president from 1951 until her death in 1955. In 1978, Edward D. Davis was president.

Central Life Insurance Company of Florida was headquartered at 1400 North Boulevard in Tampa, Florida, and had a former office at Harrison Street and Central Avenue in Tampa; and a former office in Jacksonville, Florida, located at 316 West State Street. Other branch offices for Central Life Insurance Company of Florida included Bradenton, Daytona Beach, Lakeland, Miami, Ocala, Orlando, Panama City, Pensacola, St. Petersburg, Tallahassee, and West Palm Beach.

== Closure and legacy ==
Central Life Insurance Company of Florida was shut down by Florida state regulators on August 27, 1991. The company had failed to modernize, which led to issues financially and with insurance regulators. One of the insurance company's potential investors had failed to provide backing, and around the same time another of their potential investors was accused of defrauding other insurance companies in Florida and had his assets seized by the state.

One of Central Life Insurance Company of Florida's founders, George Schroeder Middleton, had a Black high school named after him in 1934, George Schroeder Middleton Senior High School (now George S. Middleton High School).

The Mary McLeod Bethune Papers: The Bethune Foundation Collection contain resources related to the history of the Central Life Insurance Company of Florida, as well as the Robert W. and Helen S. Saunders papers at the University of South Florida Libraries.

== See also ==
- Afro-American Life Insurance Company
- Atlanta Life Insurance Company
