= Ervin's Rest =

Historic house in Florida, United States

- U.S. National Register of Historic Places
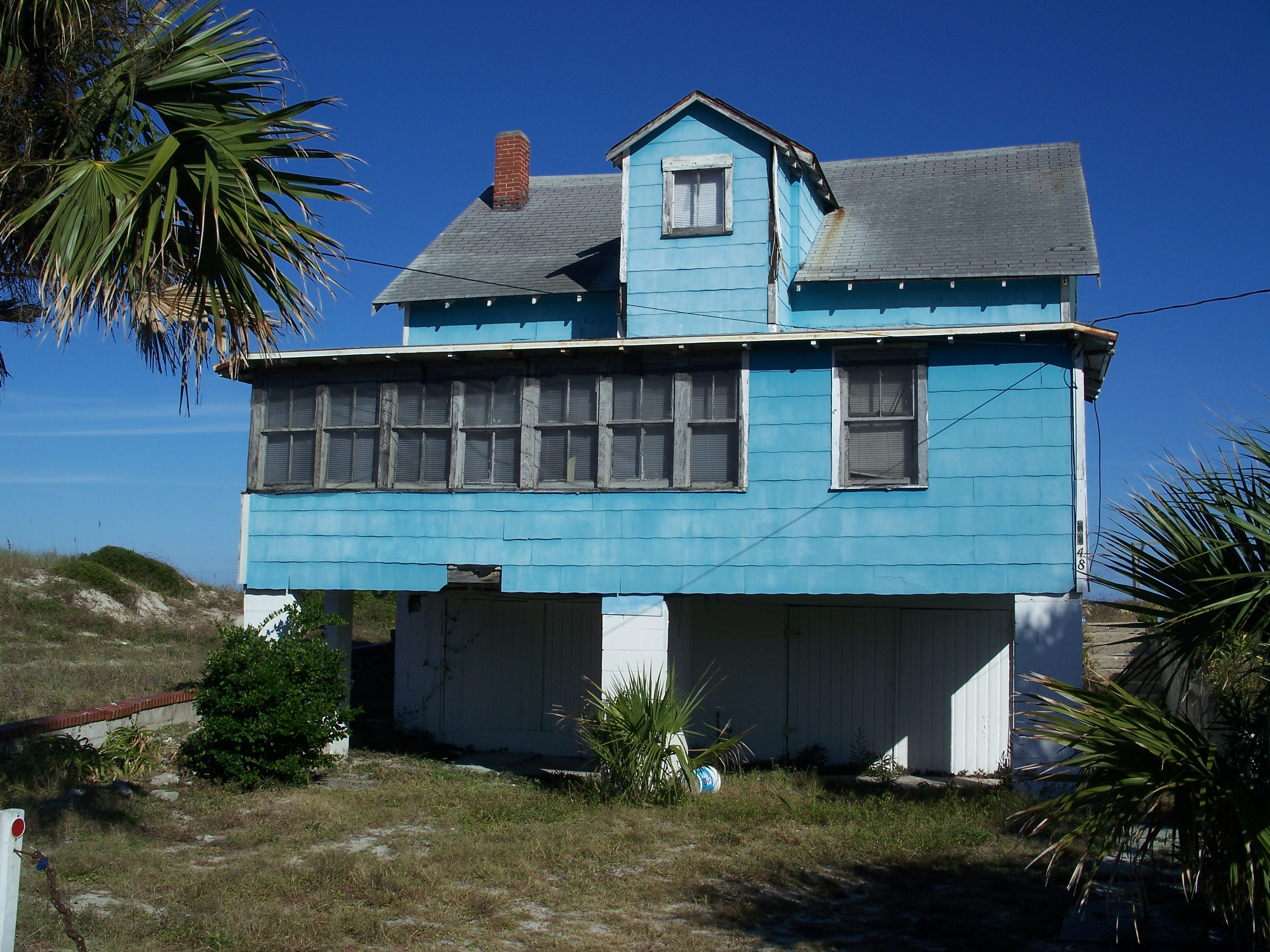

- Location within Florida Location within the United States
- Location: American Beach, Florida
- Coordinates: 30.57512°N 81.44408°W
- NRHP reference No.: 98000376
- Added to NRHP: April 23, 1998

Ervin's Rest (also known as the Louis Dargan Ervin House) is a historic site in American Beach, Florida. It is located at 5448 Gregg Street. On April 23, 1998, it was added to the U.S. National Register of Historic Places.

== Gallery ==
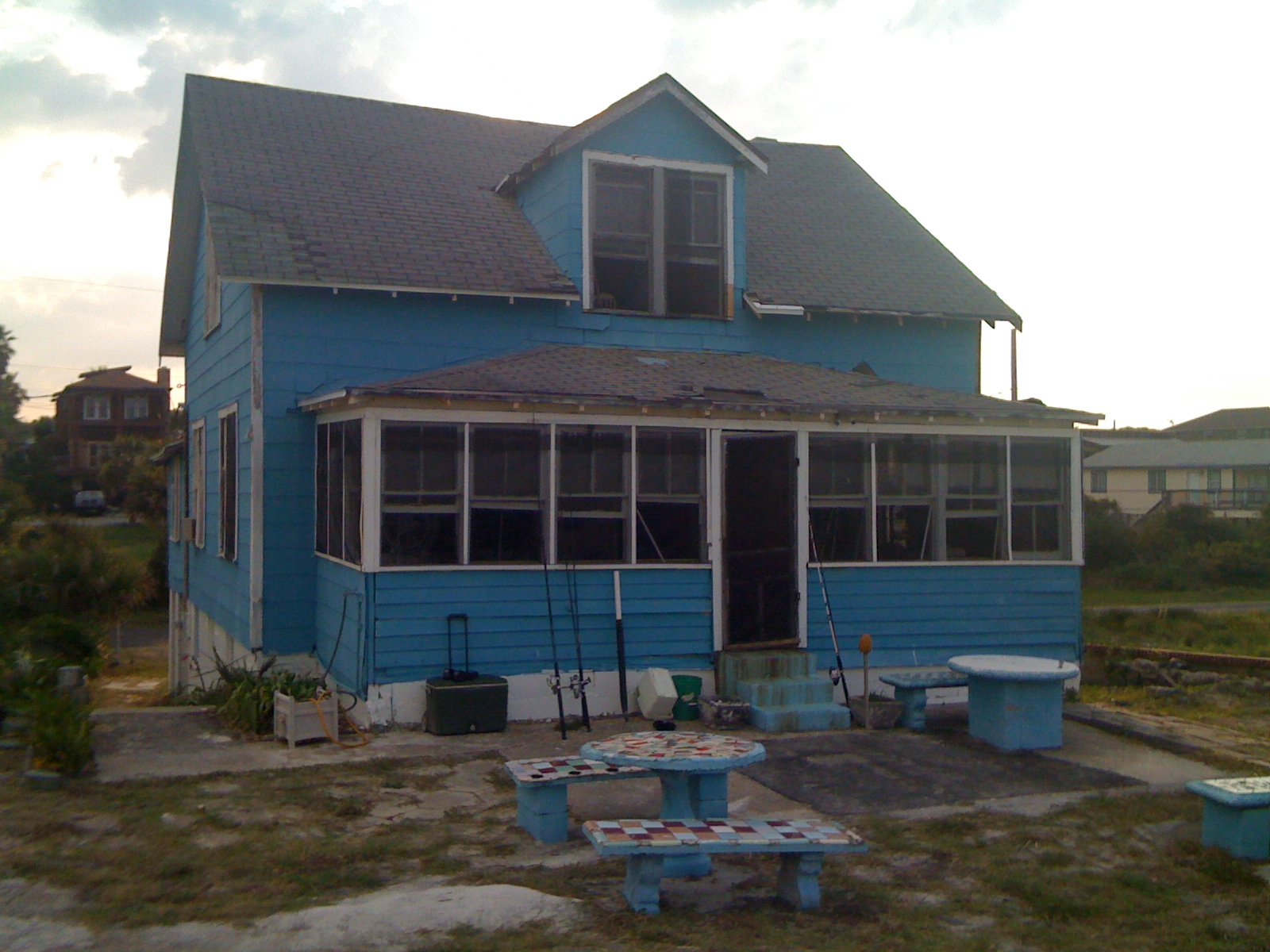

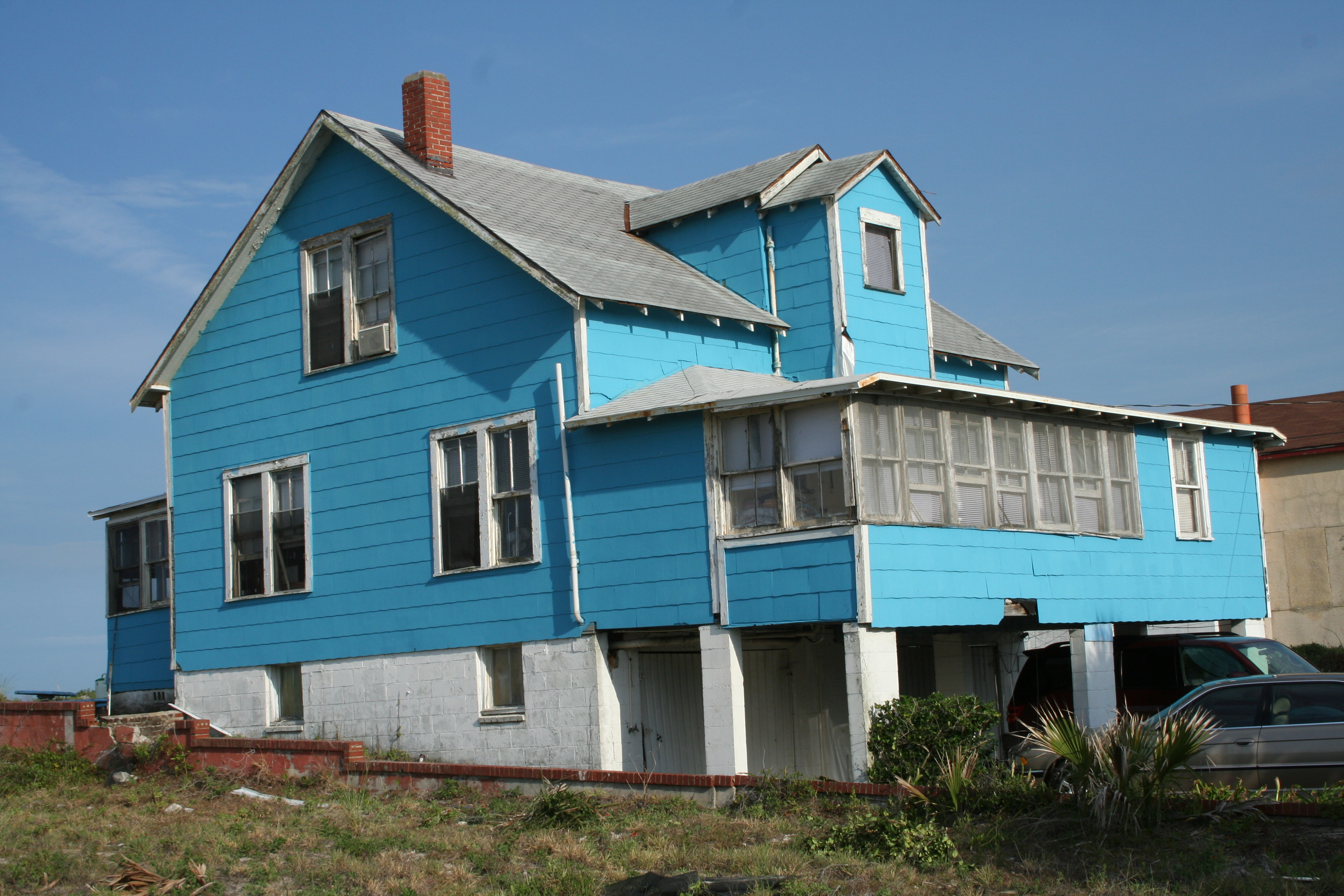

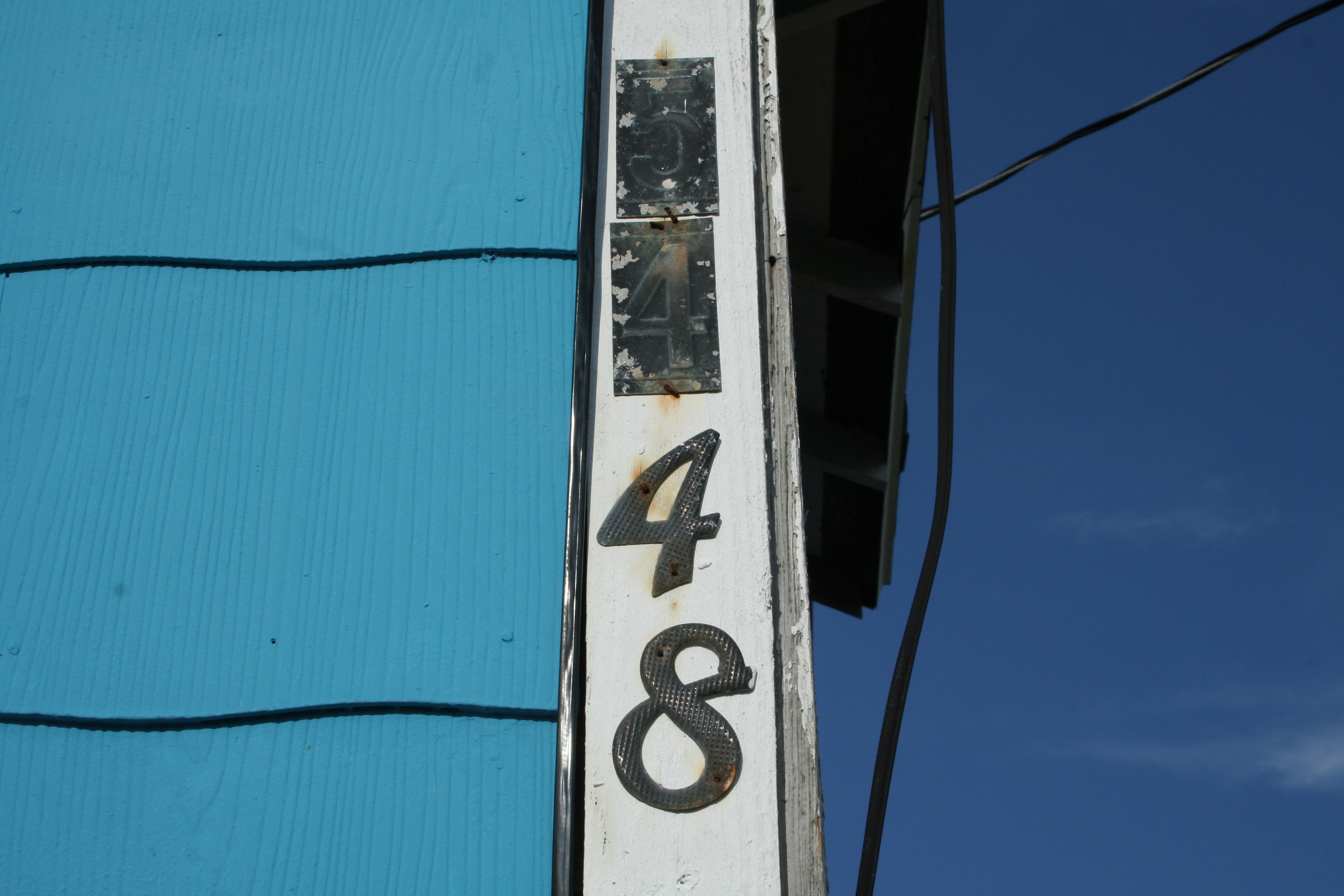

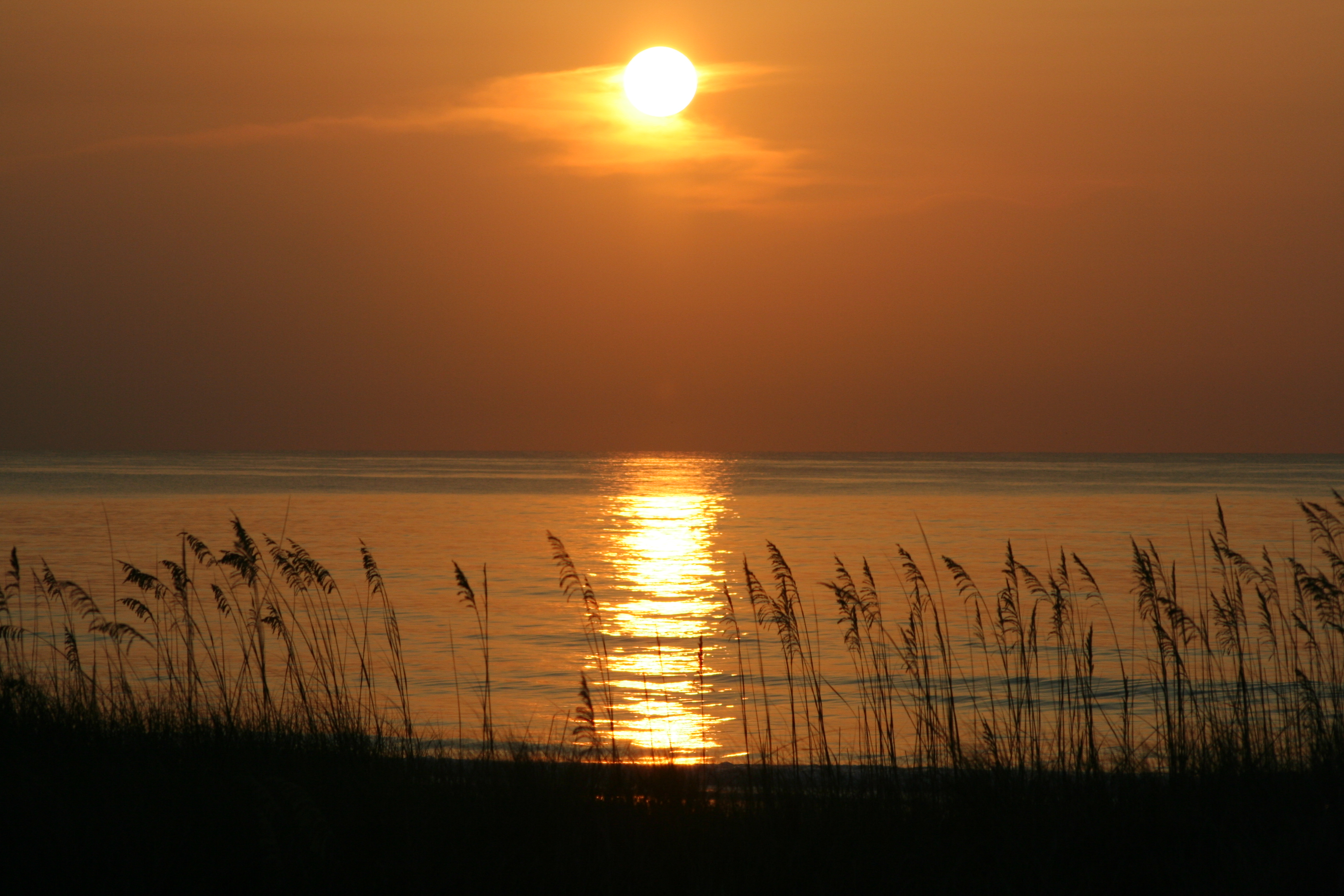

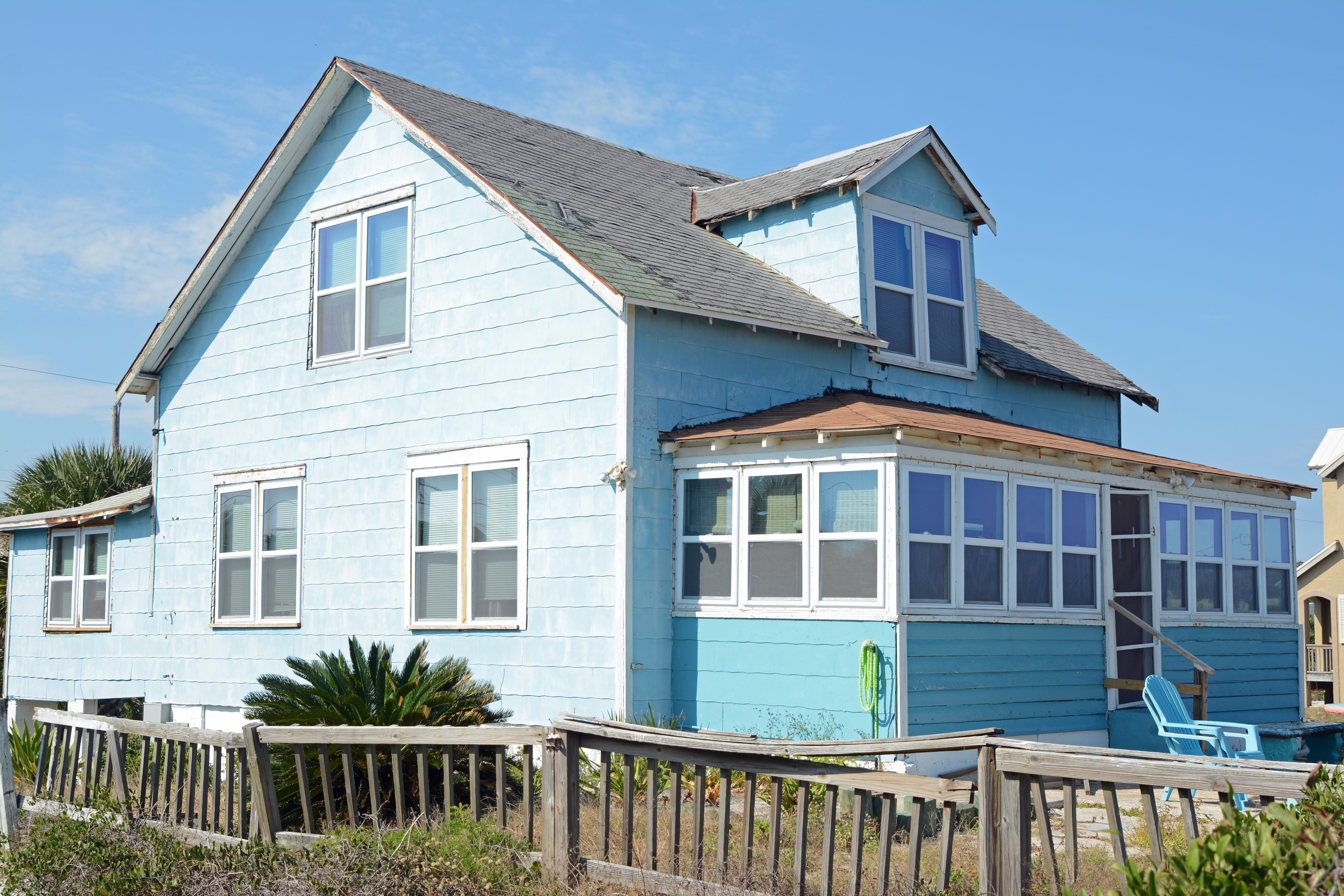
In 2015, after windows replaced

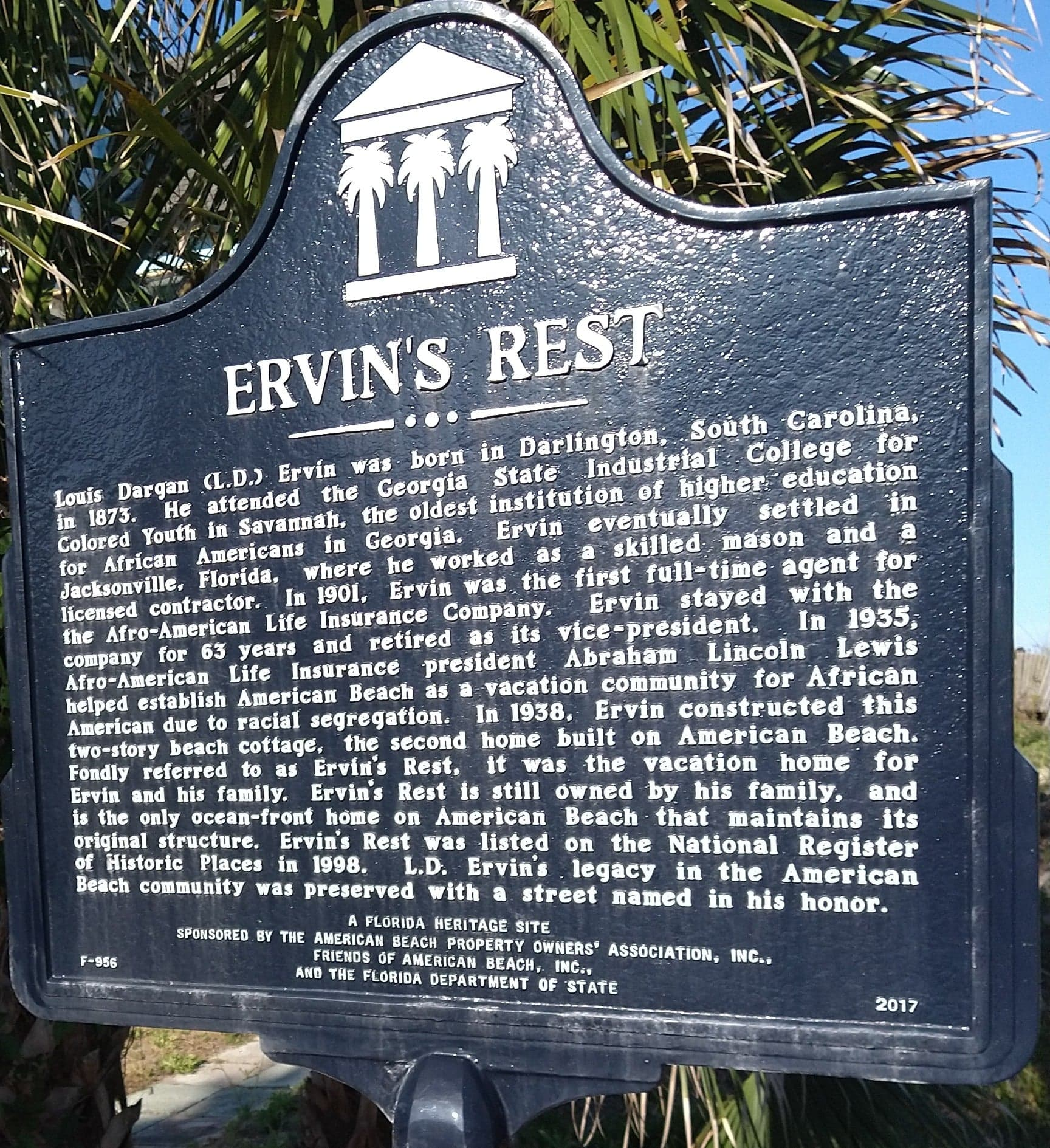
Historical marker
