= Hippard House =

Historic house in Florida, United States

- U.S. National Register of Historic Places
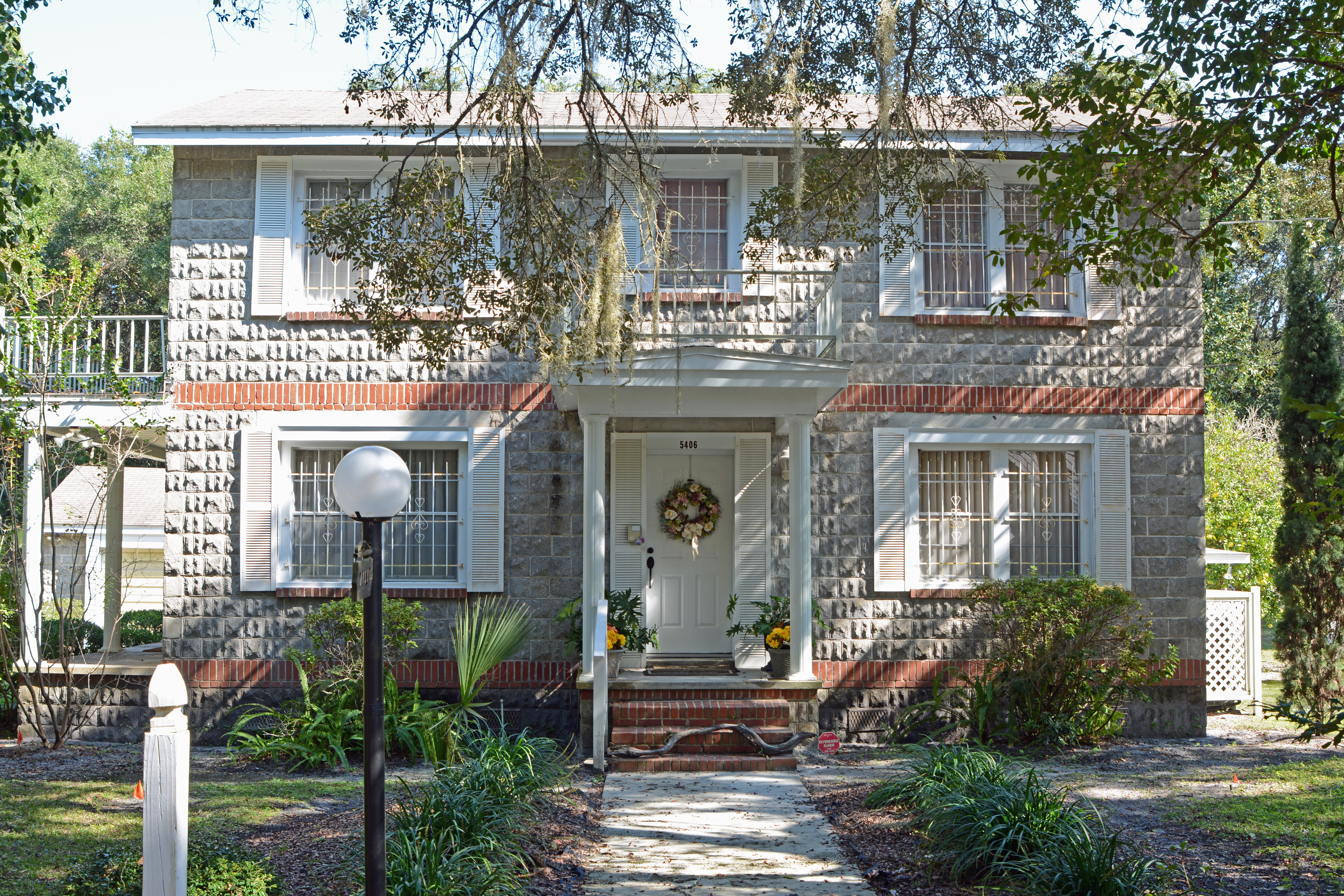

- Location within Florida Location within the United States
- Location: American Beach, Florida
- Coordinates: 30.57604°N 81.44669°W
- Architectural style: Colonial Revival
- NRHP reference No.: 01001087
- Added to NRHP: October 12, 2001

The Hippard House (also called Martha's Hideaway) is a historic site in American Beach, Florida. It is located at 5406 Ervin Street. On October 12, 2001, it was added to the U.S. National Register of Historic Places.
