= Afro-American Life Insurance Company =

Defunct American business

- Industry: Life insurance
- Founded: 1901
- Founder: Abraham Lincoln Lewis
- Defunct: 1990
- Headquarters: Jacksonville, Florida

The Afro-American Life Insurance Company was a historic business based in Jacksonville, Florida. It was founded in 1901 by Abraham Lincoln Lewis and his business associates. The company specialized in helping Black Americans obtain life insurance and mortgages.

== Background ==
Up until the creation of this insurance company, black Americans found it difficult to purchase life insurance, which was unaffordable to most blacks at the time. The insurance company also served as a financial institution as well. The company is responsible for the creation of American Beach in Nassau County, Florida.

With strong competition from other insurance companies in the mid-20th century, the Afro-American Life Insurance Company closed in 1990. The building located at 101 East Union Street, which housed the company has been renovated and served as the offices for Congresswoman Corrine Brown and other businesses.

== See also ==
- Central Life Insurance Company of Florida
