= MaVynee Betsch =

American environmentalist

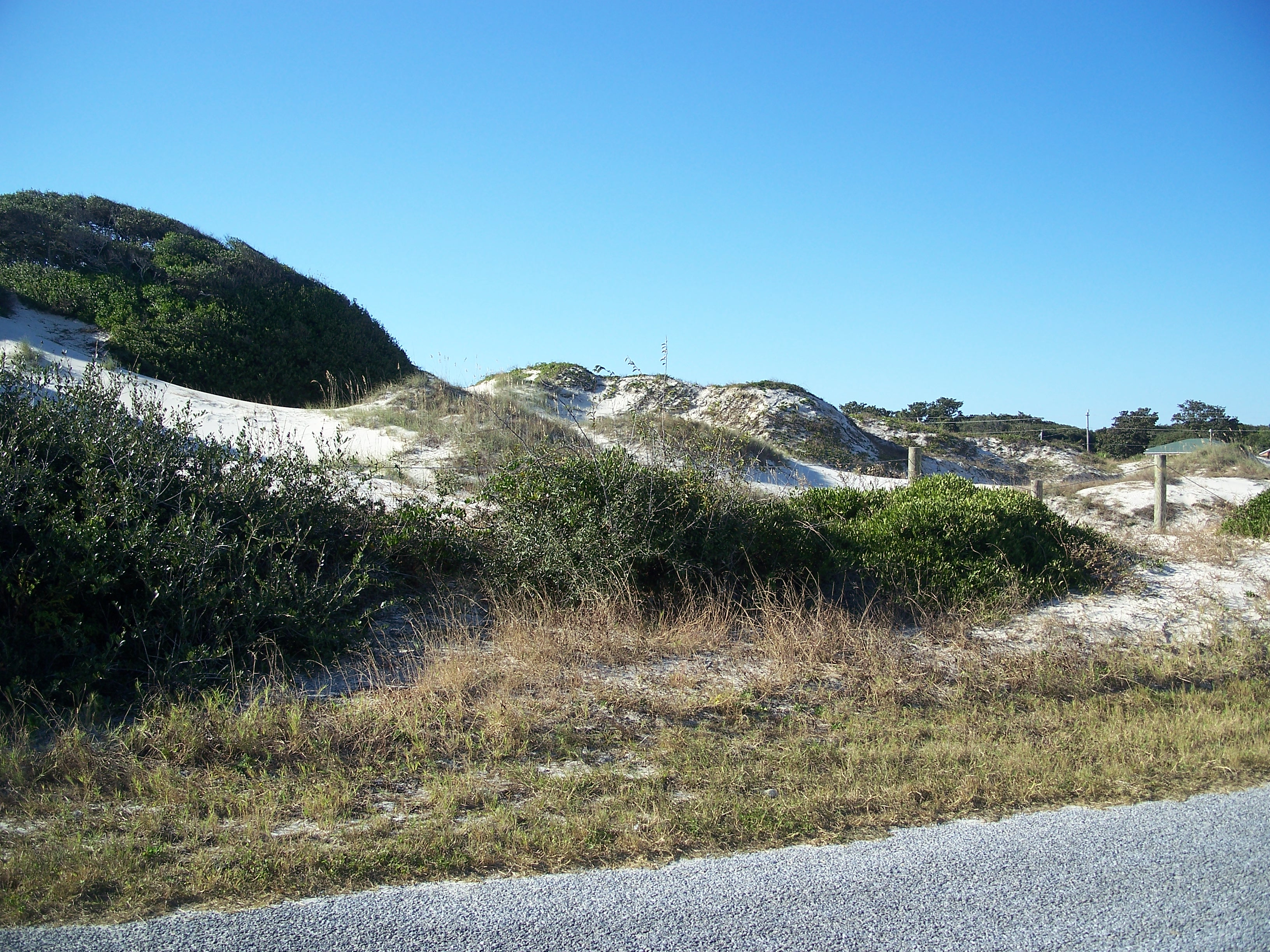
"NaNa" Dune, part of the tallest dune system of Florida’s Atlantic Coast., named by MaVynee Betsch

MaVynee Betsch, christened Marvyne Elisabeth Betsch (January 13, 1935 – September 5, 2005), was an American environmentalist and an activist. She was better known as The Beach Lady, because she spent the better part of her adult life educating the public on the black history and environmental importance of American Beach. Born in Jacksonville in 1935, Betsch lived at American Beach on Amelia Island, Florida, the African-American Hyannis port, where the crème de la crème of black society came to relax in the Jim Crow South. MaVynee’s millionaire grandfather, Abraham Lincoln Lewis, founded the beach, and she was raised in luxury as a member of the African-American upper class. Her wealth and privilege vanished after she later gave away her entire fortune to environmental causes. Afterwards, she slept on American Beach in a chaise longue for the rest of her life.

== Life ==
Betsch was born into one of the preeminent black families in the South. Her parents were Mary and John Betsch, and her grandparents were Abraham Lincoln Lewis, who founded Florida's second oldest African-American beach (Manhattan Beach to the south was the first), and Mary Kingsley Sammis, the great granddaughter of Zephaniah Kingsley and Anna Kingsley. Betsch was educated at the Oberlin Conservatory of Music in Ohio, and after earning her bachelor's degree in 1955, moved to Europe, where she was an opera singer for ten years. Betsch made her opera debut in Braunschweig in 1959.

When Betsch returned to Florida, she was diagnosed with ovarian cancer, which forced her to re-evaluate her life. Since 1975, Betsch dedicated herself to the preservation and protection of American Beach from development and destruction.

Betsch died of cancer on September 5, 2005.

She was posthumously honored as an Unsung Hero of Compassion by the Dalai Lama on November 12, 2005.

Betsch is survived by her sister Johnnetta B. Cole, an anthropologist, and her brother, John Betsch, a jazz musician.

Betsch and American Beach have inspired two women to create documentaries on the subject: An American Beach, which focuses on the history of American Beach, with conversations with The Beach Lady, and The Beach Lady, a feature-length documentary.
