= Victor Earl Mark =

American architect

Victor Earl Mark (1876–1948) was an architect in Jacksonville, Florida, United States.
