= American Beach, Florida =

Historic community in Florida, U.S.

- American Beach Historic District
- U.S. National Register of Historic Places
- U.S. Historic district
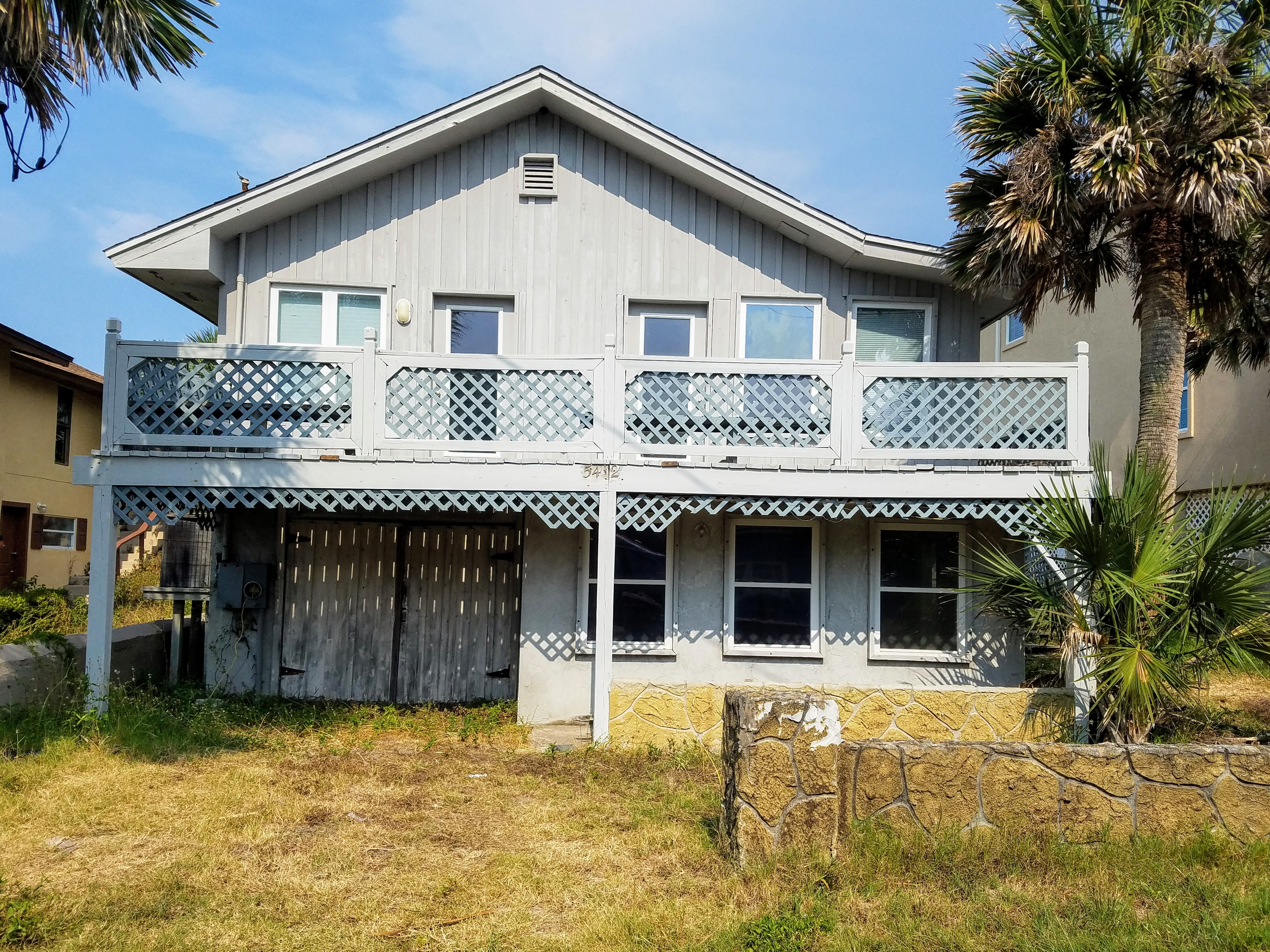
- Lewis House - May 2019

- Location within Florida Location within the United States
- Location: Roughly bounded by Gregg, Lewis, Leonard, Main and James Sts., and Ocean Blvd., American Beach, Florida
- Coordinates: 30°34′24″N 81°26′46″W
- Area: 40 acres (16 ha)
- Built: 1935
- Architect: Patterson, George; et al.
- Architectural style: Colonial Revival, Frame and masonry vernacular
- NRHP reference No.: 01001532
- Added to NRHP: January 28, 2002

American Beach is a historic beach community in northeastern Florida once popular with African-American vacationers. It is located north of Jacksonville on Amelia Island in Nassau County. During the time of segregation and the Jim Crow era, African Americans were denied access to many public amenities such as public pools and beaches in order to increase the value of nearby real estate, among other reasons. Abraham Lincoln Lewis, Florida's first black millionaire and president of the Afro-American Life Insurance Company, founded American Beach as a resort community that was visited mostly by African Americans, though all were welcome. It contains the American Beach Historic District, a historic district which was listed on the National Register of Historic Places in 2002.

== History ==
American Beach was co-founded in 1935 by Florida's first black millionaire, Abraham Lincoln Lewis, and his Afro-American Life Insurance Company. A. L. Lewis was one of the original founders of the Afro-American Life Insurance Company in 1901; with little education he became a world traveler, investor, philanthropist, and the first African-American millionaire in the state of Florida.

Since many white-owned insurance companies at the time would not insure Black Americans, A. L. Lewis's company filled a niche in the community and was very successful. With this newfound wealth, A. L. Lewis bought and built various amenities open to Black Americans, such as the Lincoln Golf & Country Club and, of course, American Beach. Throughout the 1930s, 1940s, and 1950s, summers at American Beach were busy with families, churches, and children. American Beach stretched over 216 acres. It was a place where African Americans could enjoy "Recreation and Relaxation Without Humiliation". The beach resort included hotels, restaurants, and nightclubs as well as homes and other businesses. Over time American Beach became known as "The Negro Ocean Playground" a place for "Recreation and Relaxation without Humiliation".

American Beach played host to numerous celebrities during this period, including folklorist Zora Neale Hurston, singer Billie Daniels, Cab Calloway, Ray Charles, Billy Eckstein, Hank Aaron, Joe Louis, actor Ossie Davis, and Sherman Hemsley. James Brown was turned away from performing outside Evans' Rendezvous, a nightclub on the beach. In 1964, American Beach was hit hard by Hurricane Dora, and many homes and buildings were destroyed. Before passage of the Civil Rights Act, it was not unheard of for Black beaches to be located outside of city limits, thus forcing Black families to walk miles simply to go to the ocean. After the Civil Rights Act desegregated the beaches of Florida in 1964, American Beach as a Black resort became less of a necessity and many African-American Jacksonvillians turned to locations closer to home.

A. L. Lewis's granddaughter MaVynee Betsch, known to locals as the Beach Lady, returned to American Beach in 1977 to fight for its preservation. Despite American Beach's loss of its status as a regional vacation spot for African Americans, Betsch tried to hold onto American Beach against potential buyers of the land. She wanted to make American Beach a monument to black Americans' determination to overcome the obstacles of the Jim Crow era. As of January 28, 2002, American Beach is listed as a historic site by the National Register of Historic Places. In 2003, Amelia Island Plantation bought Nana Dune and donated it to the National Park Service. For years, she planted trees along Lewis Street, offered historical tours of the beach, and fought to raise public awareness of the beach and its struggle until her death in September 2005. The American Beach Museum opened in 2014 to memorialize the history of American Beach with her help.

The American Beach Museum is dedicated to the founder of American Beach with the name "The A. L. Lewis Museum", for his contributions to the black community in Jacksonville, Florida. The museum, a lifelong dream of MaVynee Betsch, opened its doors to the public on September 6, 2014.

== Historic district ==
American Beach Historic District is a historic district in American Beach. It is roughly bounded by Gregg, Lewis, Leonard, Main, and James Streets, and Ocean Boulevard, encompasses approximately 40 acres (16 ha), and contains 67 buildings and one structure. On January 28, 2002, it was added to the U.S. National Register of Historic Places.

== Fictional portrayals ==
- Sims, Janice (2006). That Summer At American Beach. Harlequin. ISBN 1-58314-627-X.
- Sunshine State, film directed by John Sayles in 2002.

== See also ==
- African American resorts
- Bruce's Beach
- Butler Beach
- Diversity in swimming
- Manhattan Beach (Florida)
- Paradise Park, Florida

== Gallery ==
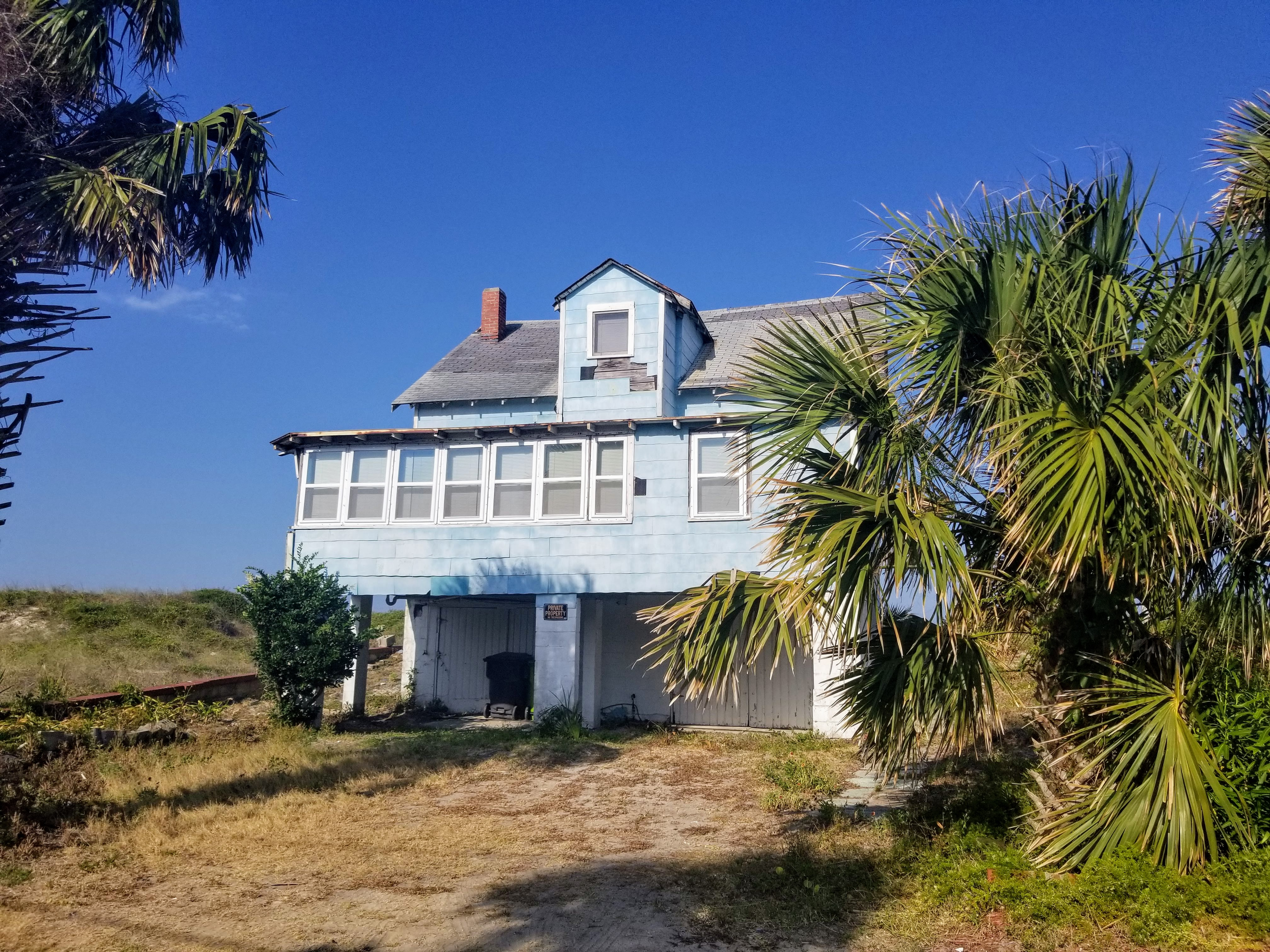
Ervin's Rest - May 2019

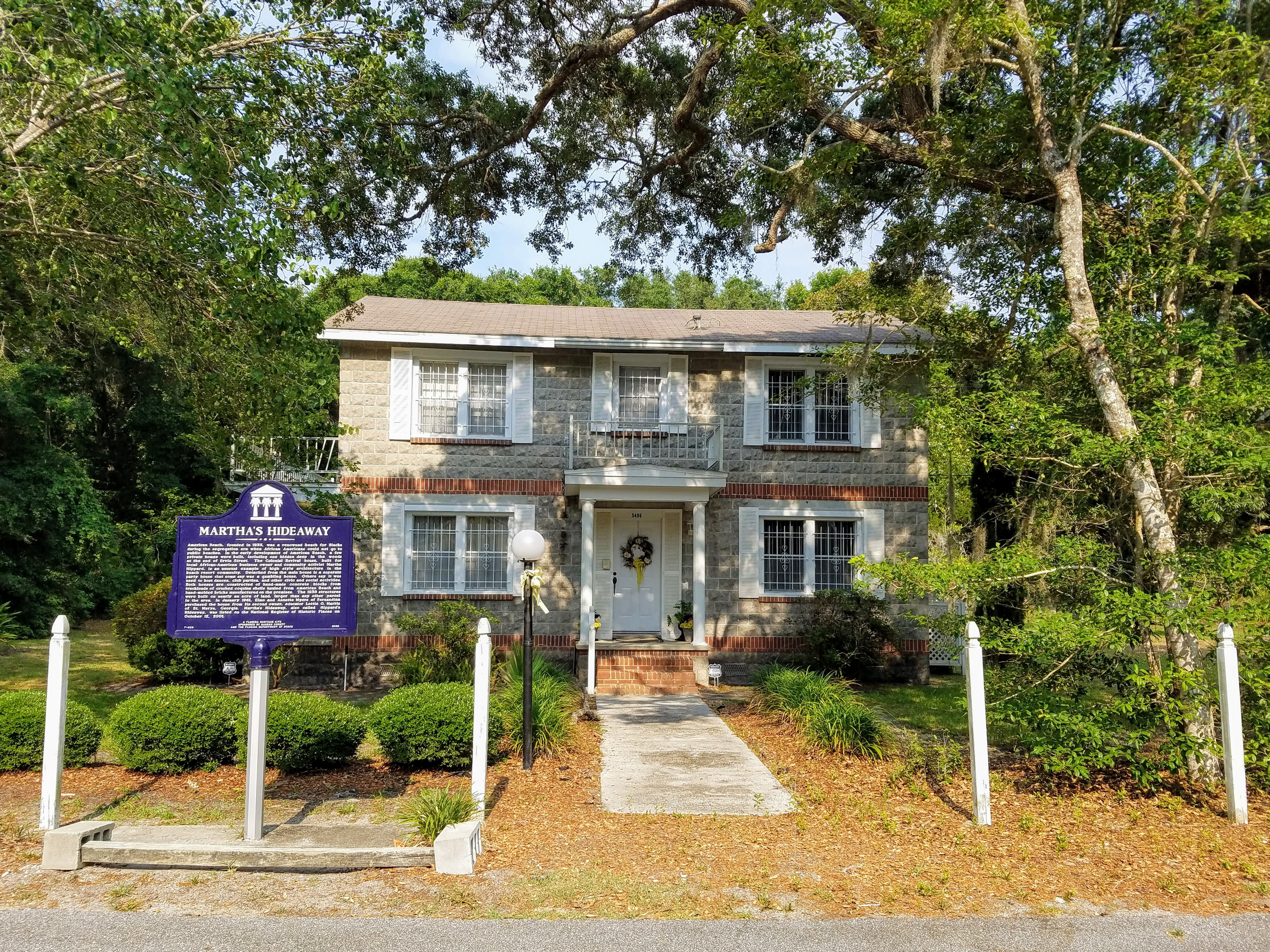
Hippard House - May 2019

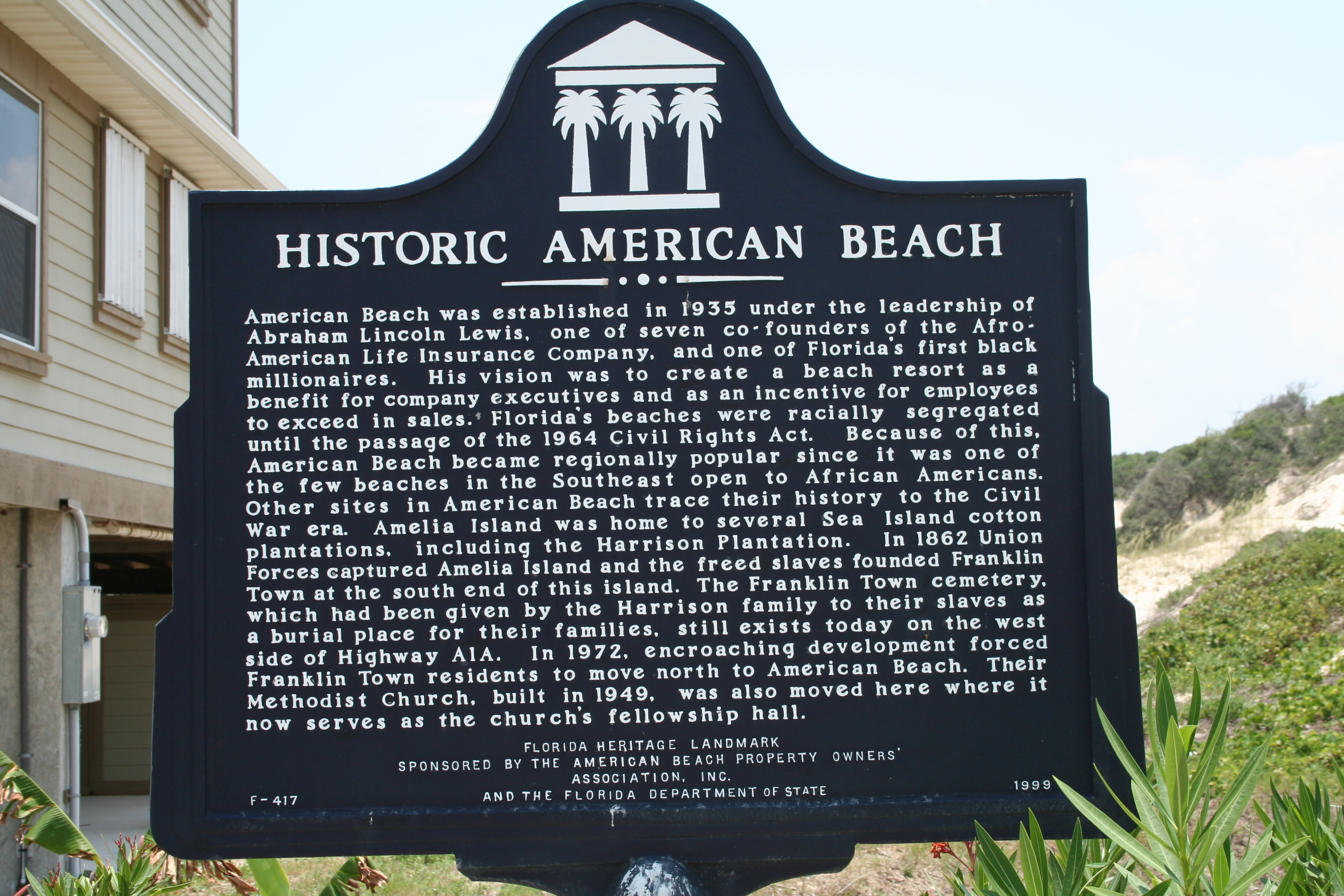
American Beach Historic Marker

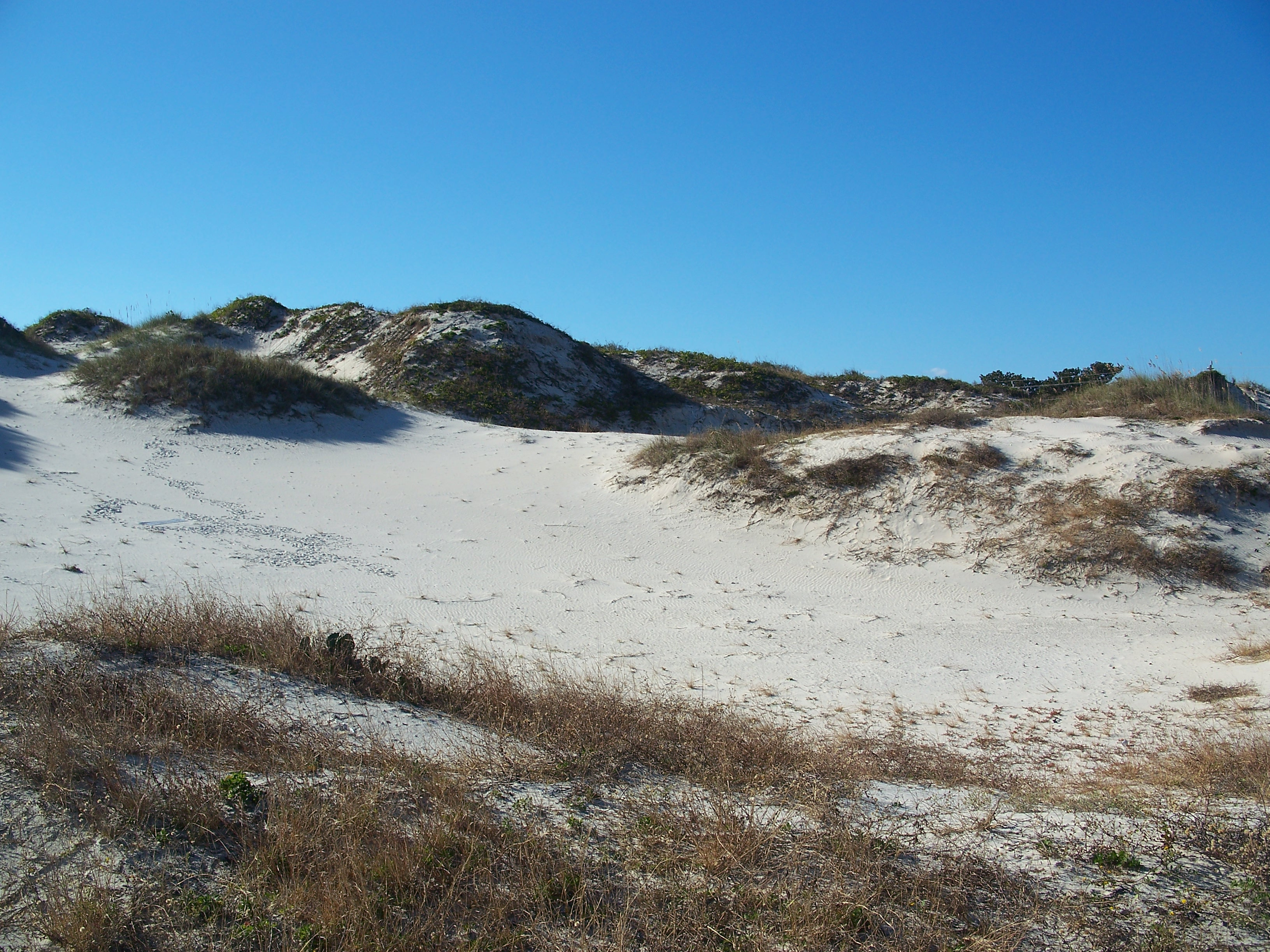
Nana Dune, named after the Beach Lady

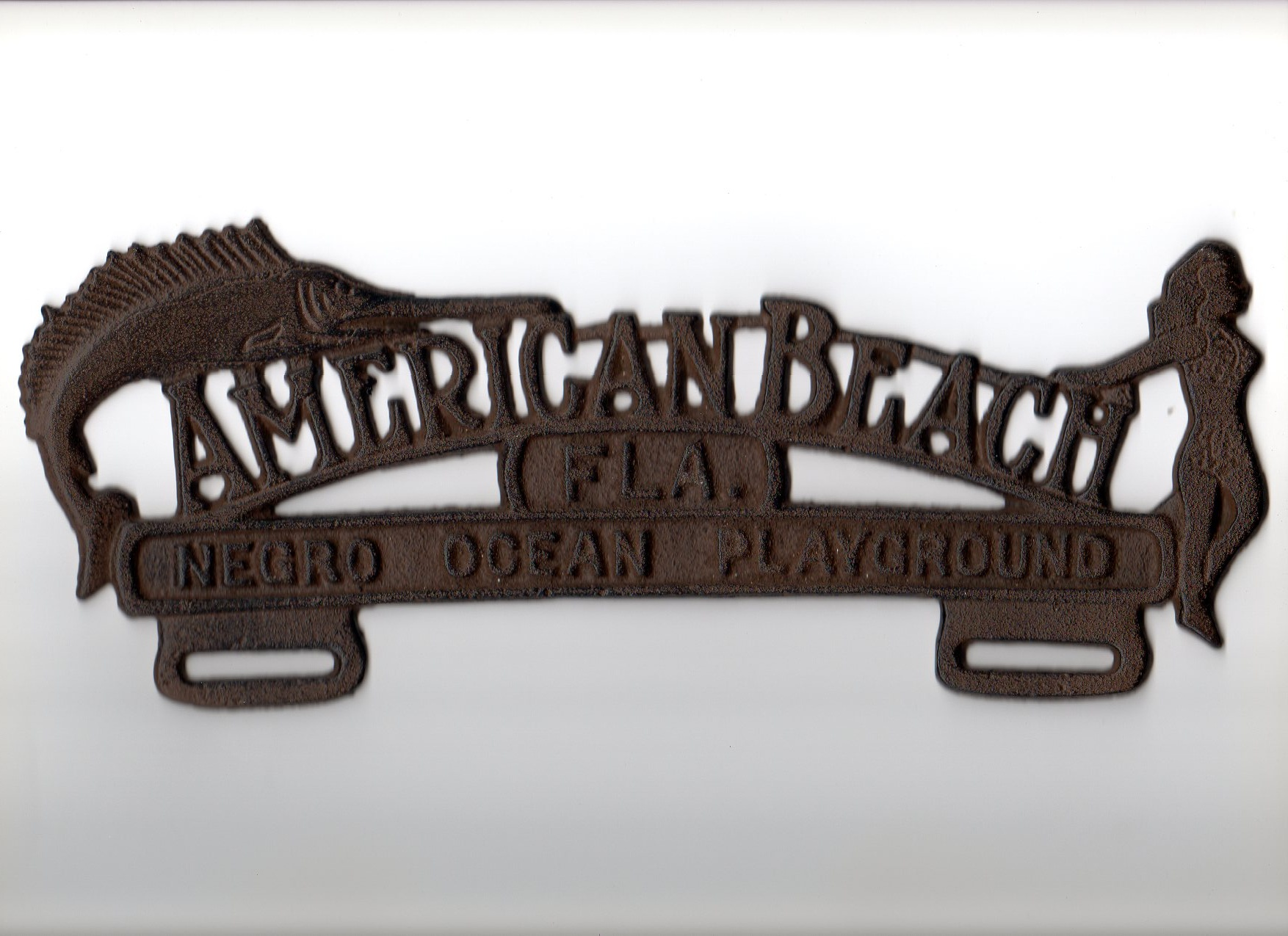
Antique Sign

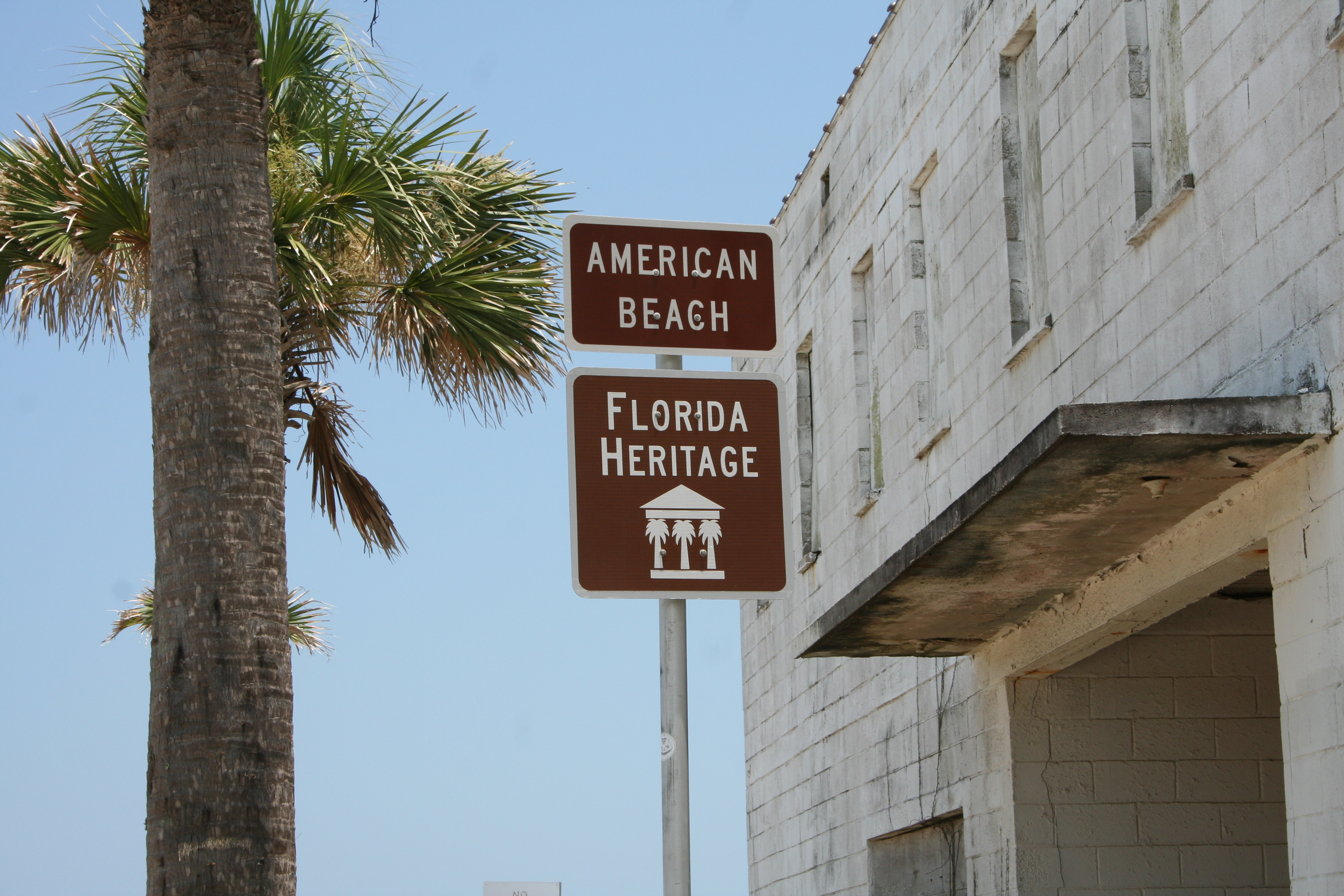

== Further reading (most recent first) ==
- Tyline King, Heidi (April 13, 2021). Saving American Beach: The Biography of African American Environmentalist MaVynee Betsch. G.P. Putnam's Sons Books for Young Readers. ISBN 978-1101996294.
- Rymer, Russ (2000). American Beach: How "Progress" Robbed a Black Town—and Nation—of History, Wealth, and Power. HarperCollins. ISBN 0-06-093089-6.
- Rymer, Russ (1998). American Beach: A Saga of Race, Wealth, and Memory. HarperCollins. ISBN 0-06-017483-8.
- Phelts, Marsha Dean (1997). An American Beach for African Americans. Gainesville, Florida: University Press of Florida. ISBN 0-8130-1504-9.

== Further reading (juvenile) ==
- Tyline King, Heidi (April 13, 2021). Saving American Beach: The Biography of African American Environmentalist MaVynee Betsch. G.P. Putnam's Sons Books for Young Readers. ISBN 978-1101996294.
