= Abraham Lincoln Lewis =

American businessman (1865–1947)

Abraham Lincoln "A.L." Lewis (1865–1947) was an influential American businessman and philanthropist who founded the Afro-American Life Insurance Company in Jacksonville, Florida, and became the state's first African-American millionaire. He also founded American Beach, a prestigious vacation spot for African Americans during the period of racial segregation.

== Background and family history ==
Named after President Abraham Lincoln, A.L. was born March 29, 1865 in Madison County, Florida, only months after the president issued the Emancipation Proclamation. Although he was known to be bright and a "voracious reader," Lewis, whose formerly enslaved father was a blacksmith, dropped out of school in the sixth grade in order to contribute to the family income. After the family moved to Jacksonville in 1880, Lewis began working as a water boy at a saw mill where, over time, he was promoted to foreman and became the highest paid Black person at the mill. He used savings from this time to purchase the first Black-owned shoe store in Jacksonville.

== Entrepreneurship and philanthropy ==
=== Afro-American Life Insurance Company (AFRO) ===
Along with six other business associates, Lewis founded the Afro-American Insurance Association in 1901, the first insurance company in Florida. The company headquarters burned down in the Great Fire of 1901, but Lewis and the others relocated the business to Lewis' home and renamed it the Afro-American Life Insurance Company. During this time Lewis served as treasurer, and he became the president of Afro-American Life in 1919. Eventually the company acquired Chathorn Mutual Life Insurance Company and expanded into Georgia.

Lewis helped to found both the Negro Business League and 50-50 Bottling, the first Black-owned bottling company in Florida.

=== American Beach ===
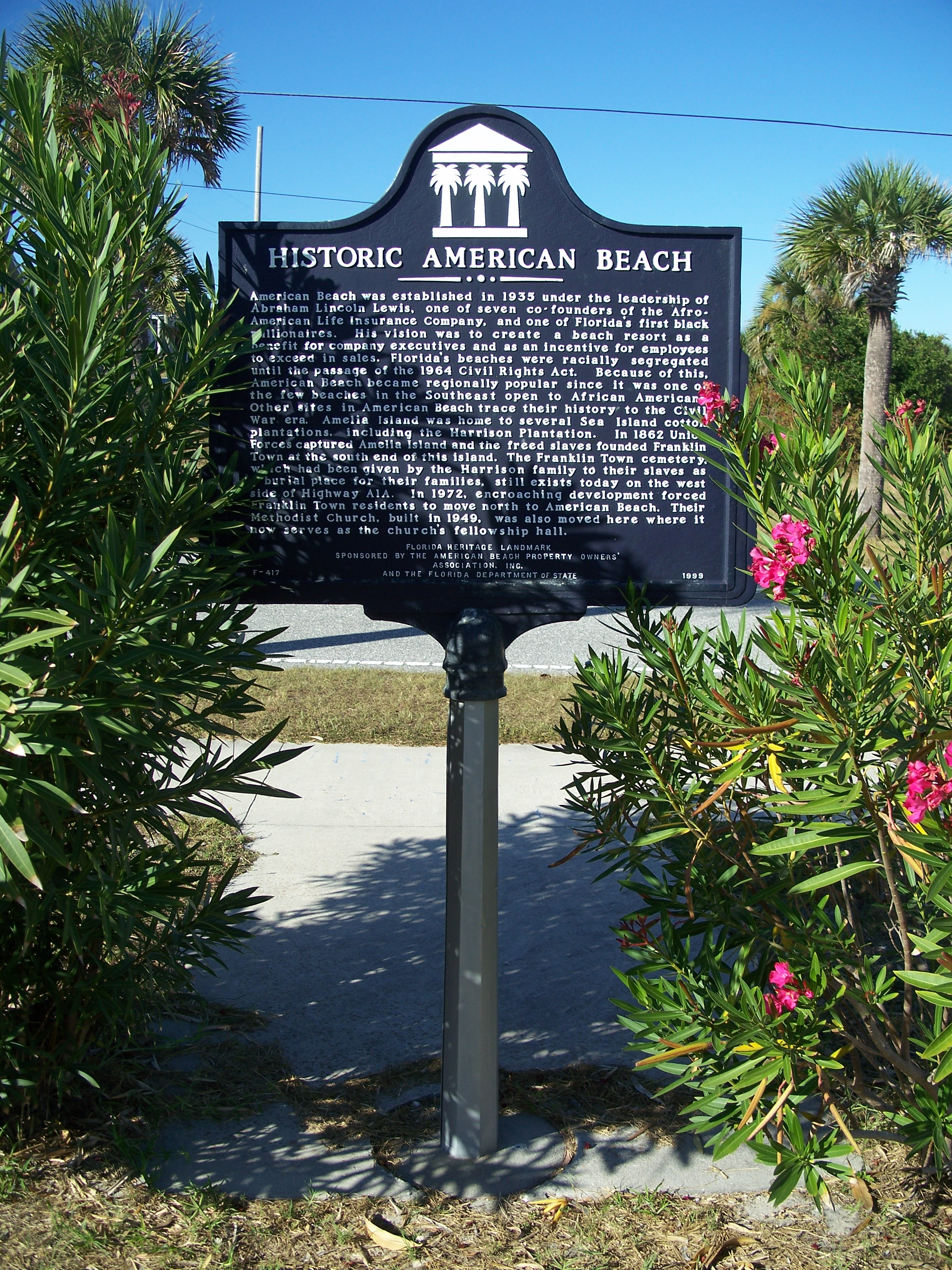
American Beach was founded on January 31, 1935.

Due to the Jim Crow laws of the day, African Americans were not allowed to enjoy many basic recreational amenities. A.L. Lewis realized the need for African Americans to have recreational activities for their families, so he founded the Lincoln Golf and Country Club, which featured a clubhouse and facilities. In 1935, Lewis purchased 200 acres (0.81 km^{2}) of Nassau County beachfront land along the Atlantic Ocean. African Americans were not permitted on most beaches in Jacksonville, and it was Lewis' dream to create a community where African Americans could visit and own reasonably-priced homes along the ocean. This community, which he named American Beach, was a thriving vacation spot throughout the 1930s, 40s, and 50s. Summers at American Beach were known for being jammed with families, churches and children. The beach included hotels, restaurants and nightclubs as well as homes and other businesses. American Beach is listed as part of the National Register of Historic Places.

Lewis was a heavy contributor to black colleges such as Jacksonville's Edward Waters College, the first HBCU in Florida, and Bethune-Cookman College.

== Legacy ==
A.L. Lewis died in 1947 and was interred in the family crypt in a historic black Jacksonville cemetery. The grave is along the road with a plaque marker placed by the city inscribed with his biography. There is a street, a youth center, and the Lewis & White Business League of Jacksonville named in his honor.

=== A.L. Lewis Museum ===
On September 5, 2014, American Beach on Amelia Island revealed a new sign to the newly renamed A. L. Lewis Museum (formally known as the American Beach Museum). This date was chosen specifically to honor American Beach activist MaVynee Oshun Betsch, Lewis' great-granddaughter, who died on September 5th, 2005. At the unveiling ceremony, attendees witnessed tributes from former Spelman College President Dr. Johnnetta Betsch Cole--one of Lewis's descendants, along with John Betsch, and Rahman Johnson, all dedicated to Lewis, Betsch and other ancestors of American Beach.

In the present day, American Beach has only retained half of its original size, due to developments leading to land loss. However, current property owners, preservationists and historians work to preserve American beach and the history behind it.

== Personal life ==
Lewis's first wife was Mary Kingsley Sammis, the great granddaughter of Zephaniah Kingsley, a slave owner and trader, and his wife and former slave Anna Magjigine Jai, whose homestead on Fort George Island is preserved as Kingsley Plantation. All three of his grandchildren are achievers: MaVynee Betsch was known for educating the public on their family history and her efforts to preserve American Beach. Dr. Johnnetta B. Cole became the first woman to serve as president of two major universities, Spelman College and Bennett College. John Betsch is an internationally acclaimed jazz drummer.
