= Rahman Johnson =

American politician and media personality

Rahman K. Johnson (born May 26, 1976, in Orange Park, Florida) is a local television & radio personality and politician; he was elected to the Jacksonville city council in May 2023.

== Politics ==
With his election to the Duval County Soil and Water Conservation District in 1999, Johnson became the youngest elected official in Florida at the time. There was some controversy surrounding an unapproved cellular phone, which was billed through the city. After much debate, it was eventually settled with Johnson agreeing to pay the $800 bill. In August 2000 Johnson was a delegate to the Democratic National Convention. In January 2001 Ebony magazine named Johnson one of "30 Young [Black] Leaders under 30" nationally. In 2002 Johnson campaigned first for the Jacksonville City Council, then for state representative, but was defeated in the September 2002 Democratic primary.

In 2018 Johnson was serving on a Jacksonville task force on the city's civil rights history.

Johnson won election to the Jacksonville City Council in District 14 in May of 2023.

== Entertainment ==
Johnson has served as an on-air radio personality in Jacksonville for WJBT 92.7, WSOL V101.5, and WXQL 105.7. He also served as a host for several shows on the local cable station (Teen Cultural Perspective, The Video Zone). He appeared on an episode (#20) of the action/adventure series Sheena in 2001. In January 2003 he appeared in a regional theatre production of Miss Evers' Boys in Jacksonville. He was the host of SPLAT, a Nickelodeon show which aired in the summer and early fall of 2004.

Johnson is (as of late 2019) an assistant professor of communications at Edward Waters University in Jacksonville.

In 2020 Johnson self-published a ebook of poetry titled Living, Loving, Letting Go . . . The book was honored in the poetry category of the EBook Literary Awards of the Black Caucus of the American Library Association in May 2021.
