= Egbert Sammis =

American politician

Egbert C. Sammis (1848 - ?) was a farmer and state senator in Florida. He also served as consul in Stuttgart.

John S. Sammis was his father. Two of his grandparents were Anna and Zephaniah Kingsley of the Kingsley Plantation.

He represented Duval County in the Florida Senate in 1885. He was listed a "mulatto".

Edmund G. Sammis (1836 - November 1892) served as a justice of the peace in Duval County.
