= A Treatise on the Patriarchal, or Co-operative System of Society =

A Treatise on the Patriarchal, or Co-operative System of Society as it Exists in Some Governments and Colonies in America, and in the United States, Under the Name of Slavery, with its Necessity and Advantages, was the first major defense of slavery published in the United States. Written by Florida slave trader, planter, and Quaker Zephaniah Kingsley, it was first published under the signature “A Resident of Florida” in 1828, although Kingsley's name is found at the end of the Preface. It was reprinted three times (1829, 1833, and 1834), indicating significant readership. No other pro-slavery writing in the United States was reprinted as often.

Kingsley believed that free people of color, better treated in Spanish Florida than in the Southern United States, should be allowed to own property, and other rights, and made the case that they were good citizens and beneficial to the country in which they lived.

Daniel Stowell included an annotated edition of the Treatise in his Balancing Evils Judiciously: The Proslavery Writings of Zephaniah Kingsley (see previous note).

== Kingsley's "Address to the Legislative Council of Florida" ==
The Treatise was preceded by Kingsley's "Address to the Legislative Council of Florida [of which he was a member] on the subject of its Colored population", about 1826. In this speech, published in 2000, he calls upon the Legislative Council to accommodate the "free colored population", so that they have a "friendly feeling toward the white population". This is necessary for "our personal safety as well as the permanent condition of our Slave property" ("the most numerous, valuable & productive class [of] our population"). In other words, and he cites examples, the free blacks would side with the whites in protecting them from slave insurrection or other slave misconduct.

This "Address", having fallen on deaf ears, was followed by his resignation from the Legislative Council. Within 10 years, Kingsley, in despair over the situation of free blacks, departed from the United States. He moved with his multiple wives, slaves, and free blacks to a new plantation, Mayorasgo de Koka, in what is now the Dominican Republic but at that time was part of Haiti.

== The Treatise ==
In the meantime, he attempted to influence public opinion towards "free people of color" by means of his self-published Treatise. In the Preface, declaring himself a "votary of rational policy", he states that his object is "to destroy the prejudice existing against slavery". According to Kingsley, if slavery is practiced with "justice" and "benevolence", slaves are just as happy as free men, equally as virtuous, less "corrupted", far more productive, and "they yield more support and benefit to the state". Furthermore, "the slave or Patriarchal System of Society...is better adapted for strength, endurability and independence, than any other state of society hitherto adopted."

=== Blacks are suited for a hot climate ===
In the body of the Treatise, he sets forth the view that blacks are better suited than whites for working in a hot climate. "The negro under the management of a just, conscientious and humane master (of which description it will certainly be allowed that there are some)...will surely enjoy a happier and more enviable state of existence than the poor white man... who has to contend with cold and hunger, besides religious and moral tyranny." "The labor of the negro, under the wholesome restraint of an intelligent direction, is like a constant stream."

=== Nations with slaves are stronger ===
According to Kingsley, a slave state is more powerful in case of war. He examines other "slave holding states". In the case of Brazil, the war between Brazil and "the Republic of Buenos Ayres" (he refers to the Cisplatine War) shows the strength of a slave state contrasted with the weakness of a white antislave state. The Brazilian slaves did not respond to the Argentine offers of freedom and protection if they escaped. "This trait of virtue and fidelity in the Brazilian slaves, is to be attributed to humane and just treatment." Under Brazilian law, any slave, in theory, could buy his freedom. Slaves are allowed to own some property, such as "stock". "The persons, properties, and rights...[of] the free people of color...are protected by law," and "the free children of quarteroons and a white man are white by law."

In the British colonies (he claims this is also true of the "Spanish, French, and Dutch colonies") the "free colored people" are "gradually rendered fit to take place of the whites, whose lives have long been uselessly sacrificed to a hot climate, which does not, nor can ever agree with them." In fact, many of the "free colored people... being rich and liberally educated, enjoy great respectability, and having the same interest with the whites, and great influence with the slaves, form a barrier to insurrection." Again, quarteroons with a white father were legally white.

In the case of Haiti, or Hayti as he spells it, many liberated slaves remained productive, on plantations, throughout the revolution. Some were armed and defended their masters. But when the "patriarchal restraint of its Colonial system of government" was gone, productivity declined greatly, as there is "less necessity for hard work" in "a healthy, fertile, and mild climate such as Hayti, where few clothes are required, and bountiful nature produces spontaneously the necessities of life."

=== The virtues of negros ===
"From all these facts it follows that, under a just and prudent system of management, negros are safe, permanent, productive and growing property, and easily governed; that they are not naturally desirous of change but are sober, discreet, honest and obliging, are less troublesome and possess a much better moral character than the ordinary class of corrupted whites of similar condition. Despite this, in slaveholding states, the white majority, who inhabit the "high, healthy country," have “a strong feeling of prejudice against every other shade of color”. As the colored are "absolutely necessary", a "smaller degree of prejudice against color would better comport". However, in our slaveholding states, "the great quantity of whites in the up country is at all times ready to put down or exterminate all the colored people in the case of insurrection." They govern by "fear and force", instead of "wisdom and policy".

North Carolina, "by the liberal provisions of her constitution and enlightened policy to her free, colored people", is the state most favorable to free blacks; "I believe no disadvantage has ever been perceived in North Carolina from its free citizens of color being allowed to vote". (The right of free North Carolina blacks to vote was taken away in 1835.) As in the British West India colonies, taxes should be the same on everyone, "and the law both criminal and civil should be as impartial as the sun".

Southern plantations will be most productive if:

- There is no fear of a slave insurrection, and
- They are sure of being able to resist "war or invasion".

=== Racial mixing as policy ===
"How much more meritorious and laudable [than improving domestic animals] would that philanthropist be to whose energy and moral courage mankind were indebted for exposing and removing a prejudice that not only continues to entail ill health and degeneracy on the people, but completely neutralises the physical [defensive] strength of the country, by placing one portion of the inhabitants in hostile array against the other."

In other words, Kingsley was advocating deliberate racial mixing, as a step towards eliminating the racial "problem". This he personally practiced; he purchased his first wife in Cuba, and later three other slaves, all of which he freed, as common-law co-wives or concubines. He commented on the "convenience" of being able to purchase wives, or sexual partners. He asserted that people of mixed negro and white parents were healthier and more beautiful than either Africans or Europeans, and considered his mixed-race children a barrier to an impending race war.

"The red aborigines were in this country a healthy people. The negroes are not only a healthy people, but robust and durable even in the swamps. The intermediate grades of color are not only healthy, but when condition is favorable, they are improved in shape, strength and beauty.... Daily experience shows that there is no natural antipathy between the casts [sic] on account of color; and it only requires to repeal laws as impolitic as they are injust and unnatural; which confound beauty, merit and condition in one state of infamy and degradation on account of complexion, and to leave nature to find out a safe and wholesome remedy for evils which, of all others, are now the most deplorable, because they are morally irreconcilable to the fundamental principles of happiness, and self preservation."

=== Kingsley's notes ===
Kingsley accompanied his 8-page text with 6 pages of notes, 5 of them occupied by one note, in which he expounds on the harm done by "white preachers (missionaries) from England". The rebel Denmark Vesey was heavily involved in religion. While inveighing against "superstition", he does note that two "influential negroes", loyal to their masters and preventing others from escaping, "were Africans and professors of the Mahomedan religion". He also speaks against "a favorite project of some of our least mathematical economists", the transporting of slaves to Africa, which he saw as prohibitively expensive. "A great opportunity was lost of colonising more rationally at the evacuation of the Spanish part of Saint Domingo [Haiti], where there would have been ample room for all the colored people of the U. States, within five days sail of Charleston."

== Reception ==
Although it was published four times, reception was mixed. While some Southerners used it to defend the institution of slavery, others saw Kingsley's support of a free class of blacks as a prelude to the abolition of it. Abolitionists considered Kingsley's arguments for slavery weak and wrote that logically, the planter should conclude that slavery must be eradicated. Lydia Child, a New York-based abolitionist, included him in 1836 on a list of people perpetuating the "evils of slavery". Although Kingsley was wealthy, learned, and powerful, the treatise was a factor in the decline of his reputation in Florida, and his decision to leave the United States.

"Given the backdrop of British emancipation, mounting slave resistance throughout the Atlantic, and the growing radicalism of abolitionism, he failed to find a sympathetic audience anywhere."
