= Johnnetta Cole =

American college president (born 1936)

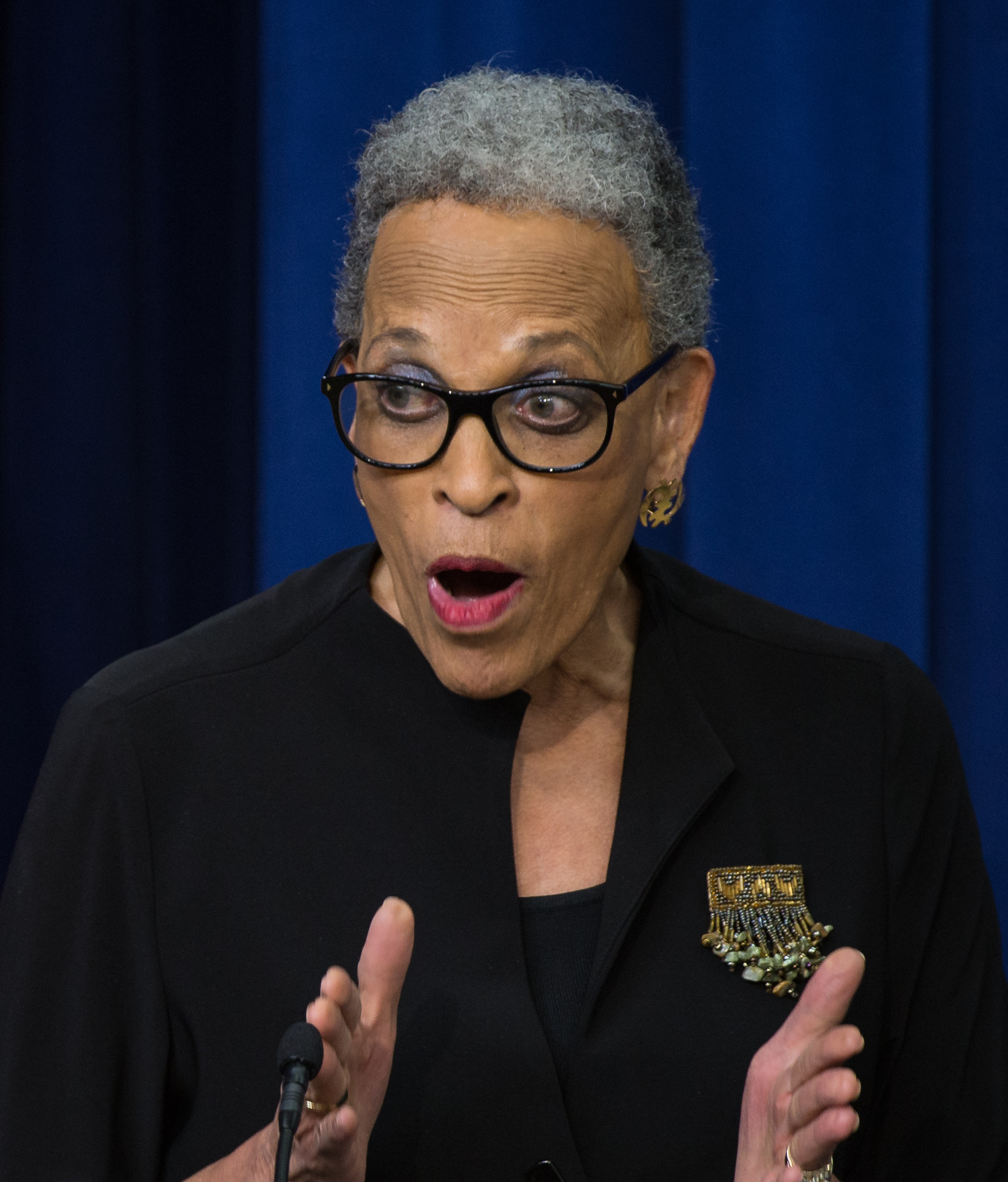
- Cole in 2015

Personal details
- Born: Johnnetta Betsch; October 19, 1936 (age 89) Jacksonville, Florida, U.S.
- Party: Democratic
- Education: Fisk University; Oberlin College (BA); Northwestern University (MA, PhD)

Johnnetta Betsch Cole (born October 19, 1936) is an American anthropologist, educator, museum director, and college president. Cole was the first female African-American president of Spelman College, a historically black college, serving from 1987 to 1997. She was president of Bennett College from 2002 to 2007. During 2009–2017 she was Director of the Smithsonian Institution's National Museum of African Art. Cole served as the national chair and 7th president for the National Council of Negro Women from 2018 to 2022.

== Background ==
Johnnetta Betsch was born in Jacksonville, Florida, on October 19, 1936. Her family belonged to the African-American upper class; She was a granddaughter of Abraham Lincoln Lewis, Florida's first black millionaire, entrepreneur and cofounder of the Afro-American Industrial and Benefit Association, and Mary Kingsley Sammis. Sammis' great-grandparents were Zephaniah Kingsley, a white slave trader and slave owner, who purchased African slave Anna Madgigine Jai in 1806, when she was 13 years old and he was 43 years old. Within 5 years, Anna bore three children, George, born June 1807; Martha, born July 1809; and Mary, born February 1811. When she was 18, Zephaniah freed Anna and she herself became a slave owner alongside her husband. It is claimed that Anna was a Wolof princess, originally from present-day Senegal. Today the Fort George Island Kingsley home is protected as Kingsley Plantation, a National Historic Landmark.

Johnnetta Cole enrolled at the age of 15 in Fisk University, a historically black college, and transferred to Oberlin College in Ohio, where she completed a Bachelor of Arts degree in sociology in 1957. Cole attended graduate school at Northwestern University, earning her Master of Arts (1959) and Doctor of Philosophy (1967) degrees in anthropology. She conducted dissertation field research in Liberia, West Africa, in 1960–1961 through Northwestern University as part of the university’s economic survey of the country.

== Teaching ==
Cole served as a professor at Washington State University from 1962 to 1970, where she co-founded one of the US's first black studies programs. In 1970 Cole began working in the Department of Anthropology at the University of Massachusetts Amherst, where she served until 1982. While at the University of Massachusetts, she played a pivotal role in the development of the university's W. E. B. Du Bois Department of African-American Studies. Cole then moved to Hunter College in 1982, and became director of the Latin American and Caribbean Studies program. From 1998 to 2001 Cole was a professor of Anthropology, Women's Studies, and African American Studies at Emory University in Atlanta.

== Administration ==
In 1987, Cole was selected as the first black female president of Spelman College, a prestigious historically black college for women. She served until 1997, building up their endowment through a $113 million (~$204 million in 2024) capital campaign, attracting significantly higher enrollment as students increased, and, overall, the ranking of the school among the best liberal arts schools went up. Comedian Bill Cosby and his wife Camille contributed $20 million (~$28.3 million in 2024) to the capital campaign.

After teaching at Emory University, she was recruited as president of Bennett College for Women, also a historically black college for women. There she led another successful capital campaign. In addition, she founded an art gallery to contribute to the college's culture. Cole is currently the Chair of the Johnnetta B. Cole Global Diversity & Inclusion Institute founded at Bennett College for Women. She is a member of Delta Sigma Theta sorority.

She was Director of the National Museum of African Art, part of the Smithsonian Institution in Washington, DC, during 2009–2017. During her directorship the controversial exhibit, "Conversations: African and African-American Artworks in Dialogue," featuring dozens of pieces from Bill and Camille Cosby's private art collection was held in 2015, coinciding with accusations of sexual assault against the comedian.

== Service ==
Cole has also served in major corporations and foundations. Cole served for many years as board member at the prestigious Rockefeller Foundation. She has been a director of Merck & Co. since 1994. From 2004 to 2006, Cole was the Chair of the Board of Trustees of United Way of America and is on the Board of Directors of the United Way of Greater Greensboro. She is a senior fellow at the Kettering Foundation, an American non-partisan research foundation.

Since 2013, Cole has been listed on the Advisory Council of the National Center for Science Education. She is a member of The Links.

== Political activity ==
President-elect Bill Clinton appointed Cole to his transition team for education, labor, the arts, and humanities in 1992. He also considered her for the cabinet post of Secretary of Education. However, when The Jewish Daily Forward reported that she had been a member of the national committee of the Venceremos Brigades, which the Federal Bureau of Investigation had tied to Cuban intelligence forces, Clinton did not advance her nomination.

== Legacy and honors ==
- In 2026 she was named a Woman of Distinction by Girl Scouts of Gateway Council
- In 2018 she was awarded the Legend in Leadership Award for Higher Education from the Yale Chief Executive Leadership Institute
- American Alliance of Museums Honors Dr. Johnnetta Cole with 2017 Award for Distinguished Service to Museums
- In 2013, Cole received the highest citation of the International Civil Rights Center & Museum, the Alston-Jones International Civil and Human Rights Award.
- Cole has received more than 40 honorary degrees, including those from Williams College and Bates College in 1989, Oberlin College in 1995, Mount Holyoke College in 1998, Mills College in 1999, Howard University and North Carolina A&T State University in 2009, and Gettysburg College in 2017.
- She received honorary membership in Phi Beta Kappa from Yale in 1996, and has served as a Phi Beta Kappa Senator.
- In 1995, Cole received the Golden Plate Award of the American Academy of Achievement presented by Awards Council member and Morehouse College President Walter E. Massey.
- She received a Candace Award from the National Coalition of 100 Black Women in 1988.
- Dr. Cole is the subject of a historical public mural in Amherst, Massachusetts's north "Mill District" cultural and recreational area.

== Quotes ==
I pose that question to myself, why, in the 107 years of the history of this historically Black college for women, there has not been an African-American woman president.

— Johnnetta B. Cole

This is a nation whose spoken and written vision is chillingly beautiful.

— Johnnetta B. Cole

The more we pull together toward a new day, the less it matters what pushed us apart in the past.

— Johnnetta B. Cole

We are for difference: for respecting difference for allowing difference, for encouraging difference, until difference no longer makes a difference.

— Johnnetta B. Cole

The ultimate expression of generosity is not in giving of what you have, but in giving of who you are.

— Johnnetta B. Cole
