= Anna Madgigine Jai Kingsley =

Former slave who became a major slave owner in Florida and Haiti

- Born: Anta Madjiguène Ndiaye; 18 June 1793; Senegal
- Died: April or May 1870; Jacksonville, Florida
- Occupations: Slave (later freed), Wife, plantation manager, slave owner

Anna Madgigine Jai Kingsley, born Anta Madjiguène Ndiaye (18 June 1793 – April or May 1870), also known as Anna Kingsley, Anta Majigeen Njaay or Anna Madgigine Jai, was a West African woman from present-day Senegal, who was enslaved and sold in Cuba, probably via the slave pens on Gorée Island. In Cuba she was purchased, as wife, by plantation owner and slave trader Zephaniah Kingsley. After his death, she became a planter and slave owner in her own right, as a free Black woman in early 19th-century Florida.

Her early history is not known in detail. She was born among the Wolof people in 1793; her father was a leader, and she is sometimes referred to as a princess, though she never claimed such descent. When she was 13 years old, she was captured and sent to Cuba, where she was purchased by, impregnated by, and married, in a native ceremony, to Zephaniah Kingsley, a slave trader and plantation owner. They had four children together. Kingsley freed Anna Jai in 1811, when she turned 18, and gave her responsibilities for his plantations in East Florida, then under Spanish colonial rule. For 25 years, Kingsley's unusual family lived on Fort George Island (part of modern-day Jacksonville). Anna Jai managed a large and successful planting operation. After gaining freedom, she was given a Spanish land grant for 5 acres (20,000 m^{2}) and owned 12 slaves. After defending their property against invading Americans, she was awarded a land grant of 350 acres (1.4 km^{2}) by the Spanish government.

After the United States took control of Florida and American discriminatory laws threatened the multi-racial Kingsley family, most of them moved to Haiti. Kingsley died soon after, and Anna returned to Florida to dispute her husband's white relatives who were contesting Kingsley's will; they sought to exclude Anna and her children from their inheritance. The court honored a treaty between the United States and Spain, and Anna was successful in the court case, despite a political climate hostile toward people of African descent. She settled in the Arlington neighborhood of Jacksonville, where she died in 1870 at 77 years old. The National Park Service protects Kingsley Plantation, where Anna and Kingsley lived on Fort George Island, as part of the Timucuan Ecological and Historic Preserve.

== Early years ==
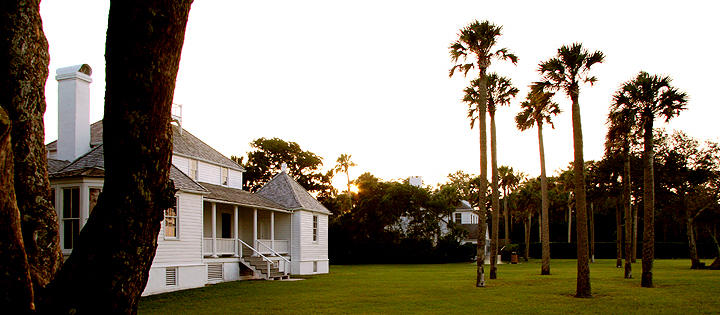
Front of the owner's house, at Kingsley Plantation

Daniel L. Schafer, the biographer of Anna Kingsley, has based his account of her early life on conjecture based on his research into the history of the area. She was born Anta Majigueen Ndiaye in 1793 in present-day Senegal, in a portion of West Africa that was disrupted by a fierce war between the majority Wolof people and the minority Fula. Slave raids were frequent occurrences during incessant violence that left many small villages deserted, as people were abducted to be sold into slavery or they fled in fear for their lives. Following an intensifying of the crisis in 1790, Anta was captured in 1806 when she was about 13 years old, probably by Tyeddo raiders from the Futa Toro. Wolof tradition holds that a mythological figure named Njaajaan Ndiaye established the Jolof Kingdom that existed between 1200 and 1550. Through her father, Anta was a Ndiaye descendant and carried that name. Her mother also had ancestors who had held the title of the Buurba Jolof, or king of the Wolofs. Although lineages are disputed, there is a belief that Anta may have been the daughter of a still ruling (as opposed to formerly ruling) branch of the royal family.

She was described later as "a very unusual 'native'—tall, dignified, with well formed features, and a commanding presence."

== Marriage to Zephaniah Kingsley ==
The traditional story of the next chapter of her life is that she was transported through the infamous middle passage to Havana, Cuba. There, as he himself testified, she was purchased, newly arrived (bozal), by planter and slave merchant Zephaniah Kingsley. He married her in "a foreign land", presumably Cuba, "celebrated and solemnized by her native African custom."

Schafer, who supports this version, suggests that Anta was sent to Gorée Island, a slave embarcation point from the West African coast to the Americas. She was transported to Havana, Cuba; the name of the ship she was aboard is unknown. When Africans arrived in the Western Hemisphere to be sold into slavery, slave traders generally did not record their given names, but only their age, sex, and sometimes ethnicity, which were most important to buyers.

In September or October 1806, Anta was displayed for sale and bought by Zephaniah Kingsley, a slave trader, merchant, and resident of Spanish Florida, who was 43, while Anta was 13. While Kingsley said later that they were married in a traditional, non-Christian ceremony, no further information, much less documentation, on this marriage has emerged.

In contrast, according to Kathleen Wu, writing in 2009, Kingsley sought a wife in Africa, and his story of his having bought her in Cuba was false, intended to strengthen her credentials as free. According to her, Kingsley needed to establish that she had been enslaved, for his manumission to be valid.

Whether he purchased and married Anta in Africa or Havana, she shared Kingsley's cabin on the ship transporting slaves from Gorée to Havana. By the time Kingsley and Anta reached Florida, she was pregnant with their first son, George.

== Laurel Grove ==
After a brief stop in St. Augustine, Zephaniah Kingsley's ship made its way up the St. Johns River, stopping in an inlet now named Doctors Lake. Attached to the lake was a dock, the main entrance to Kingsley's plantation, which he had named Laurel Grove. Kingsley had become a citizen of Spanish Florida in 1803, likely because it allowed him to continue his international slave trading, at a time when Great Britain and the United States were moving to prohibit it (which they did in 1807). He had been granted the plantation three years before by the Spanish colonial government in exchange for his having brought 74 slaves to the territory. Spain was making generous land grants so as to attract settlers into Florida.

Many years later, Kingsley wrote that he and Anta, now called Anna, had been married in a traditional African ceremony "in a foreign land", which historians have taken to mean Cuba, though there is no evidence of it besides Kingsley's statement. It was not a Christian marriage. By the time she arrived at Laurel Grove, she was pregnant. Laurel Grove was a prosperous plantation that grew oranges, sea island cotton, peas, and potatoes. Over a hundred slaves worked there, who were from several African ethnic groups; they lived in two groups of houses. Anna, however, lived with Kingsley in his large house. At Laurel Grove, as at many other southeastern plantations, Kingsley used the task system to manage work. Slaves were given a quota to fill; when they were finished, they were allowed to pursue their own tasks. Some tended personal gardens, while others produced crafts, both of which they were able to sell. Whether due to cultivation techniques or the task system, Laurel Grove was quite successful. One year the plantation made $10,000 (equivalent to $230,357 in 2025), which was an extraordinary income at the time, particularly for sparsely populated Florida.

In 1811, when she turned 18, Kingsley granted Anna legal manumission, which confirmed her high status at the plantation. Most visitors had assumed she was already a free woman. Emancipation was critical to her future. Three children had been born to the Kingsleys by this time: George, born June 1807; Martha, born July 1809; and Mary, born February 1811. Kingsley assured their emancipation as well. Had he died before they were freed, Anna and the children would have been sold as slaves.

As Kingsley was involved in shipping as well as the slave trade, he was frequently away from the plantation. Laurel Grove had a manager, also a former slave who had been freed. Kingsley trusted Anna to represent him at the plantation. (Note: Mark Fleszar writes that how much Anna managed Laurel Grove "deserves caution" as Kingsley's letters indicate white overseers were responsible for the day-to-day issues of the plantation when he was away on business. Kingsley told abolitionist Lydia Child in an interview that Anna was "very capable, and could carry on all the affairs of the plantation in my absence, as well as I could myself", but he either deliberately misrepresented other details in his life or Child's reporting was inaccurate, calling into question other statements Kingsley was reported to have made. (Fleszar, p. 72.))

Much later, Kingsley described his wife as "a fine, tall figure, black as jet, but very handsome. She was very capable, and could carry on all the affairs of the plantation in my absence as well as I could myself. She was affectionate and faithful, and I could trust her." In his will, he said "she has always been respected as my wife and as such I acknowledge her, nor do I think that her truth, honor, integrity, moral conduct or good sense will lose in comparison with anyone."

In 1813 as a free woman, Anna Kingsley petitioned the Spanish government for land. She was awarded 5 acres (20,000 m^{2}) in Mandarin, Florida, across the river from Laurel Grove. She purchased goods and livestock to get her farm started, as well as 12 enslaved workers. Slavery within African societies, generally as a result of capture during warfare, was a custom with which Anna would probably have been familiar, including the fact that female slaves often married their masters in order to obtain freedom.

Kingsley was kidnapped the same year and held until he endorsed the Patriot War of East Florida, an unsuccessful insurgency by Americans to annex Florida to the United States. Americans and American-supplied Creek Indians raided towns and plantations in (north) Florida, sending any blacks they captured into slavery, regardless of their legal status. The Patriots took Laurel Grove and 41 of its slaves, using the facilities as their headquarters while they carried out similar raids in the area. Kingsley fled after being released, his whereabouts unknown. To evade the Americans, Anna approached the Spanish and negotiated her escape, bringing along her children and a dozen slaves. She burned Kingsley's plantation to the ground while the Spanish watched. Anna asked the Spanish to return her to her own homestead, and she burned it, too, preventing its use by the Patriots. For her actions, after the war the Spanish government granted Anna 350 acres (1.4 km^{2}).

== Fort George Island ==
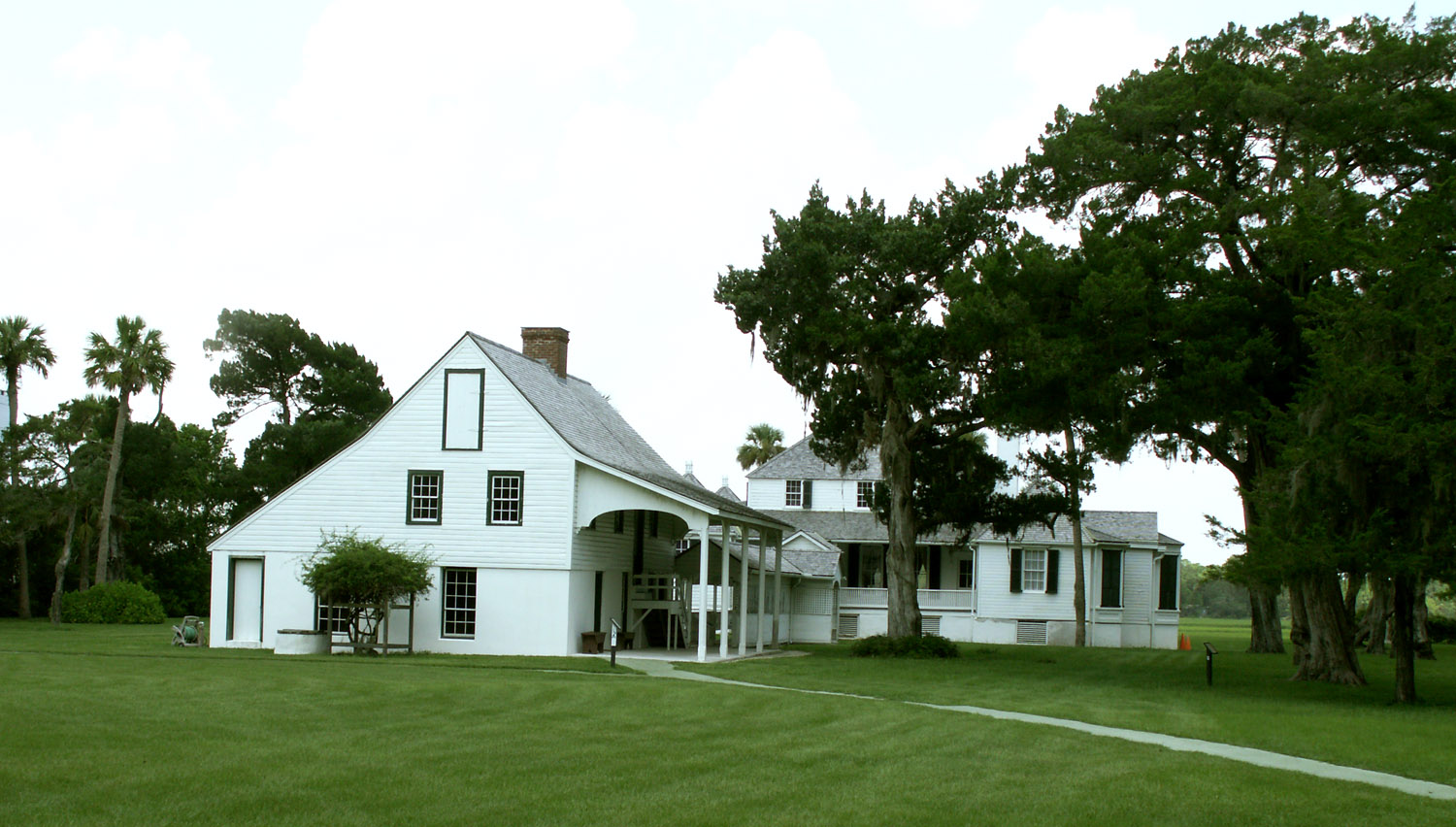
Maam Anna's apartments, now restored by the National Park Service, were above the kitchens. The main house is in the background.

In 1814 Zephaniah Kingsley purchased another plantation, located on Fort George Island, near the mouth of the St. Johns River. The owner's house had been looted and vandalized, and every other structure on the property was destroyed. While the slave quarters and various other buildings were being rebuilt, Anna moved in, taking over managing the plantation while Kingsley was away on business.

At some point in the 1820s, they built a separate kitchen. It had a room above it where Anna lived with her children. Called the "Ma'am Anna House", this followed the common West African custom of wives' living separately from their husbands, particularly in polygamous marriages. Kingsley took three other wives, all slaves, while at Fort George Island. Two of them brought children. He had a total of 9 children from his four African wives, and no white children.

Thirty-two slave cabins were constructed not far from Kingsley's house. They were constructed of tabby, made by pounding oyster shells into lime and adding water and sand. The shells came from the massive middens left by the Timucua who previously inhabited the island. Anthropologists suggest that Anna may have had the knowledge to instruct her slaves how to form the tabby because it was widely used in West Africa. The foundation of "Ma'am Anna House" was also constructed of tabby, which proved to be fireproof and more durable than wood. The slave quarters were arranged in a semi-circular pattern that was an anomaly in the South. Some historians have suggested Kingsley arranged them to keep better watch over his slaves. Author Daniel Schafer hypothesized that Anna may have been responsible for the layout of the slave quarters: many African villages were similarly arranged in circular patterns.

In 1824, Anna bore her fourth son, John, who was baptized in a Catholic ceremony with the daughter of another of Kingsley's wives. Anna befriended a white woman named Susan L'Engle, who was much impressed with Anna and called her "the African princess". (L'Engle's great-granddaughter, children's author Madeleine L'Engle, wrote of her stories in a book entitled The Summer of the Great-Grandmother.) Susan L'Engle had the impression that Anna was quite lonely though her jobs at the plantation kept her constantly busy. Kingsley's young niece remembered much later her first impression of Anna:

I remember her very distinctly. She was not black, and had the most beautiful features you ever saw. She was a most imposing and very handsome woman. Her smooth, light brown skin, her dark-eyes and wavy [sic] made her outstanding, and I would not keep my eyes away for admiration. She was quiet and moved with regal dignity—I have never seen anything like her, before or since. Her daughter was there also, and she was very light in color, but not as good-looking as her mother. I was six or seven years old at the time. I was Kingsley's niece. The next morning my aunt, Mrs. Gibbs, sent two servants for us with a horse and buggy, and we were carried over to Newcastle. My mother was furious that we had spent the night at Ma'm Anna's, but it could not be helped.

== Haiti and return to Florida ==
After Spain ceded control of Florida to the U.S. in 1822, the new state government progressively enacted stricter ordinances separating the "races," as was common among other states in the US South. Southern states increased restrictions on free Blacks after the Nat Turner's Rebellion of 1831. The mixed-race Kingsley family was directly and negatively affected by these "illiberal and inequitable laws", as Kingsley stated in his will. Kingsley transferred all their holdings to the three older children and moved to Haiti in 1835. (The area he moved to is now in the Dominican Republic.) Their two oldest daughters had already married white planters in Florida and remained there. Anna and their youngest son followed Kingsley to Haiti in 1838. In all, 60 slaves, family members, and freed employees moved with Kingsley to Haiti to farm a plantation called Mayorasgo de Koka. Because slavery was prohibited in Haiti, Kingsley converted his slaves to indentured servants, who could earn their freedom with another nine years of labor. Kingsley portrayed life in Haiti as idyllic. In 1843, when Anna was 50 years old, Kingsley died on his way to New York, where he was buried.

One of the laws passed by the Territorial Council of Florida that so alarmed Kingsley was the provision that mixed-race children could not inherit property from their fathers. The territory also did not recognize "interracial" or polygamous marriages as legal. The year following Kingsley's death, his sister Martha and her children contested his will as "defective and invalid". Kingsley's sister cited Florida law that forbade Black people from owning property, and claimed that Anna and Kingsley's other wives moved to Haiti spontaneously, abandoning the property in Florida to become free people. Anna returned to Florida in 1846 to participate in the Kingsley estate defense, despite the increasingly tense racial climate in Duval County.

The court upheld the treaty signed between the U.S. and Spain stipulating that all free Blacks born before 1822 in Florida enjoyed the same legal privileges as they had when Spain controlled East Florida. Anna furthermore asked for and was granted the transfer of ownership of slaves who had been sent to the San Jose plantation when the family had moved to Haiti. Her request to rent slaves to other plantations to maximize her profits was rejected by the courts.

Anna and her children became Union sympathizers when the American Civil War broke out the following year. She and other free blacks were evacuated by Union forces when they captured Jacksonville in 1862. She returned home the following year to be closer to her daughters, and died in 1870 at the age of 77. She was buried in Jacksonville but no one knows where; her tombstone has been lost.

== Descendants ==
Anna Kingsley has descendants that identify as white, Black, and/or Latino (of any race) and live primarily in the United States and the Dominican Republic. Her black-identified descendants in Jacksonville, Florida, formed part of the Black Upper Class for more than a century after her death: her great-granddaughter Mary Kingsley Sammis was the wife of Abraham Lincoln Lewis, Florida's first black millionaire, and Sammis and Lewis' descendants include the noted academic Johnnetta Betsch Cole, the conservationist MaVynee Betsch and the jazz musician John Betsch.

== Works about Anna Kingsley ==
Music The Original Song: Anta Majigeen Njaay- written and performed by Jennifer Chase with Les Frères Guissé (1998) recorded at Studio 2000, Dakar Senegal. video trailer of Majigeen interview with playwright, director, choreographer, actor

=== Theater ===
- Majigeen, a musical drama by Jennifer Chase, a musical first produced in 2005.
- Anna is the subject of a short documentary in the 2018 collection Uncovering Jax.

=== Books ===
- Freedom Bound, by Rosalie Turner (2006), is a historical novel about Anna.
- Anna's daughter Mary is the protagonist of the 2008 children's book The Treasure of Amelia Island, by M. C. Finotti.

== Teaching material ==
- Tilford, Kathy (1997). "Anna Kingsley: A Free Woman". OAH Magazine of History. 12 (1): 35–37. JSTOR 25163192.

== See also ==
- Ana Gallum
- Suzanne Amomba Paillé
- Elisabeth Samson

== Further reading (most recent first) ==
- Delaney, Bill (October 31, 2019). "Old Red Eyes And The Ghosts Of Kingsley Plantation". The Jaxson.
- Fleszar, Mark (2009). The Atlantic Mind: Zephaniah Kingsley, Slavery, and the Politics of Race in the Atlantic World. M.A. thesis, Georgia State University. Archived from the original on 2009-11-14.
- Schafer, Daniel L. (1996). "Shades of freedom: Anna Kingsley in Senegal, Florida and Haiti". Slavery and Abolition. 17 (1): 130–154. doi:10.1080/01440399608575179.
