= Charles H. Fairbanks =

American anthropologist (1913–1984)

Charles Herron Fairbanks (June 3, 1913 – July 17, 1984) was an archaeologist/anthropologist. He conducted archaeology at the Ocmulgee National Monument in Macon, Georgia where he developed rigorous, painstaking field methodology. His 1967–1969 excavations on the slave cabins at Kingsley Plantation, Fort George Island, Florida—the southernmost of the Sea Islands—were the first of their kind in the United States. Undertaken to "learn more about slave life," he called his practice "Plantation Archaeology," and for more than a decade the graduate program he led at the University of Florida was the only one in the nation with a concentration in African American archaeology. Fairbanks also led the first excavations at Fort Mose, the first free African American settlement in the present-day United States, confirming the location of the fort in 1971. He introduced "backyard archaeology" into historical archaeological research. This studies objects and signs of daily life that are found in the areas and outdoor spaces around homes. He wrote an article in 1976, "Backyard Archaeology as a Research Strategy". He argued that these spaces could reveal how people lived at historical sites.

== Biography ==
Charles Herron Fairbanks was born on June 3, 1913, in Bainbridge, New York. He served in the United States Army from 1943 to 1945.

He worked on the Tennessee Valley Authority archaeology projects during his college years in 1937 and 1938. He graduated in 1939. He later went on to the University of Michigan graduate school. Later he became the superintendent at Fort Frederica National Monument and was eventually a professor at University of Florida, Gainesville.

In 1983 Fairbanks received the J. C. Harrington Award, presented by the Society for Historical Archaeology for his life-time contributions to archaeology centered on scholarship.

Charles Herron Fairbanks died on July 17, 1984.

== Publications ==
- Archaeology of the Funeral Mound: Ocmulgee National Monument, George (1956, reprinted 2003)
- The Occurrence of Coiled Pottery in New York
- The Plantation Archaeology of the Southeast Coast
- The Florida Seminole People (1975)
- Florida Archaeology w/Jerald Milanich (1987)

== Sources ==
- Georgia Archaeology Who's Who
