= Zephaniah Kingsley =

English-born planter and slave trader (1765–1843)

- Born: December 4, 1765; Bristol, England
- Died: September 14, 1843 (aged 77); Atlantic Ocean
- Citizenship: British (1765–1793), American (1793–1798), Danish (1798–1803), Spanish (1803–1821), American (1821–1836), Haitian (1836–1843)
- Occupations: Slave trader, planter
- Known for: Prolific trade of slaves
- Notable work: A treatise on the patriarchal, or co-operative system of society as it exists in some governments, and colonies in American, and in the United States under the name of slavery, with its necessity and advantages, 1828
- Title: Member Florida Territorial Council
- Spouses: Polygamous (Note: He had four Black "wives," or concubines, none with a Christian marriage, although he claimed to have married Anna outside the U.S., in an African ceremony. Legal wife (recognized by American courts after his death): Anna Kingsley. Co-wives, or concubines: Flora Kingsley, Sarah Murphy, and Munsilna McGundo (all enslaved at time relationship with Kingsley began))
- Children: 11, all from Black mothers
- Relatives: James Whistler (great-nephew); Anna McNeill Whistler; (niece)

Zephaniah Kingsley Jr. (December 4, 1765 – September 14, 1843) was an English-born planter, merchant and slave trader who moved as a child with his family to the Province of South Carolina and enjoyed a successful mercantile career. He built four plantations in the Spanish colony of Florida near what is now Jacksonville, Florida. He served on the Florida Territorial Council after Florida was acquired by the United States in 1821. Kingsley Plantation, which he owned and where he lived for 25 years, has been preserved as part of the Timucuan Ecological and Historic Preserve, run by the United States National Park Service. Finding his large and complicated family progressively more insecure in Florida, he moved them to a vanished plantation, Mayorasgo de Koka, in what was then Haiti but soon became part of the Dominican Republic.

In his will, Kingsley called himself a planter, but he was in his younger years first and foremost a slave merchant, and proud to be one: a "very respectful business", in his words. He owned and captained slave ships, and was actively involved in the Atlantic slave trade. A document of 1802 records his arrival at Havana as First Officer of the Superior with 250 Africans, and another of 1808, 60 slaves to a Spanish land grant. He was also pro-slavery, but by the standards of the day, he was a liberal slave owner. He has been called "a man ahead of his time." He was a relatively lenient slaveholder who respected slave families and allowed his enslaved a freedom not routine: the opportunity to hire themselves out when their work was completed, and eventually purchase their freedom for 50% of their market value.

Kingsley's main business in Spanish Florida was providing a ready supply of well-trained slaves, who were smuggled by or to planters of Georgia and South Carolina. This, plus his "interracial" family, resulted in Kingsley's being deeply invested in the Spanish system of slavery and society. As in the French colonies, certain rights were provided to a class of free people of color, and children of female slaves were allowed to inherit property from their white fathers. "In the Spanish Floridas free people of color...enjoyed tremendously elevated status when compared to virtually any other person of African descent in North America."

Kingsley changed nationalities based on which would most help his slave trading enterprises. Born British, in 1793 he took an oath of naturalization to the United States. In 1798 he swore allegiance to Denmark, and in 1803 to Spain (Spanish Florida), All residents of Spanish Florida who did not leave automatically became American citizens, as is also seen in Kingsley's appointment to the Florida Territorial Legislature in 1822 (in appointing him, President James Monroe called him "one of the most fit and discreet persons in our territory.") At his death his nationality was Haitian, acquired in 1836.

== Early life and education ==
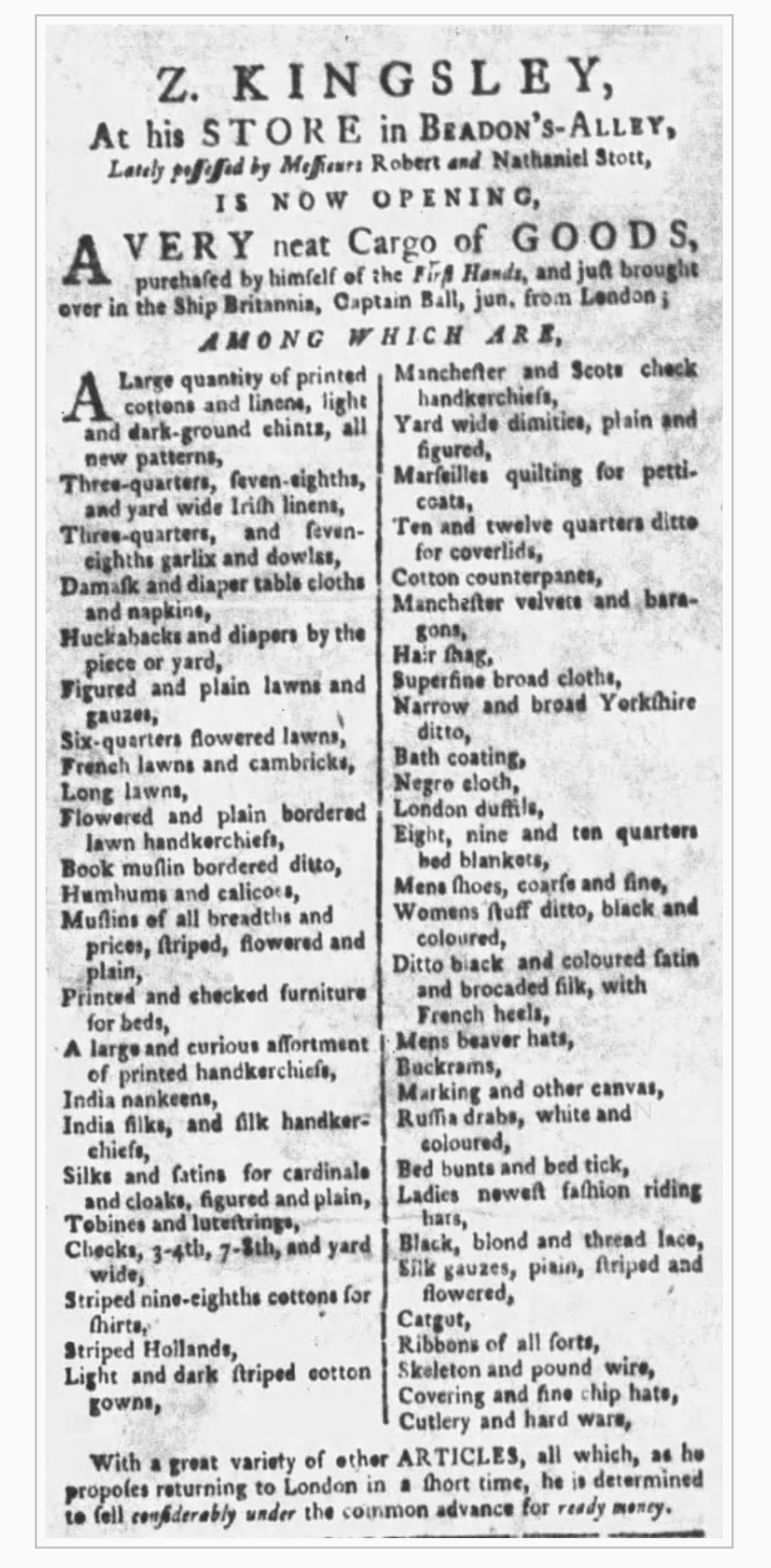
Ad for Zepheniah Kingsley Sr.'s store, Charleston, S.C., 1772

Kingsley was born in Bristol, England, the second of eight children, to Zephaniah Kingsley Sr., a Quaker from London, and Isabella Johnstone of Scotland. The elder Kingsley moved his family to the Colony of South Carolina in 1770. His son grew up in Charleston, South Carolina, where the father became a successful merchant. At the age of 15 he was sent to London for his education, although details are lacking; Zephaniah Kingsley Sr. purchased a rice plantation near Savannah, Georgia, and several other properties throughout the colonies and Caribbean islands. In total, he owned probably around 200 slaves in all, and thousands of acres of land. Like other British Loyalists, Kingsley Sr. was forced to leave South Carolina with his family, and his properties and business were confiscated by the new government. He relocated to New Brunswick, Canada, in 1782 following the American Revolutionary War, where the Crown provided him some land in compensation for his losses, and he again became a successful merchant.

His son Zephaniah Kingsley Jr. returned to Charleston, South Carolina, in 1793, swore his allegiance to the United States, and began a career as a shipping merchant. His first ventures were in Saint-Domingue, during the Haitian Revolution, where coffee was his main interest as an export crop. He lived in Haiti for a brief period while the fledgling nation was working to create a society based on former slaves transitioning into free citizens. Kingsley traveled frequently, prompted by recurring political unrest among the Caribbean islands.

== Kingsley and Blacks ==
Kingsley stood alone among Southern statesmen in maintaining that Blacks were just as intelligent as Whites. He ridiculed racism, observing that "color ought not to be the base of degradation." In Kingsley's opinion, "the colored race" was "superior to us, physically and morally. They are more healthy, have more graceful forms, softer skin, and sweeter voices. They are more docile and affectionate, more faithful in their attachments, and less prone to mischief, than the white race. If it were not so, they could not have been kept in slavery."

Kingsley himself reports that he spoke "several African dialects". When he was in command of a slaving ship, his crew of sailors were all Black men, most of them enslaved. His farm at Laurel Grove, staffed by Africans without white people present, has been called "a transplanted African village". He supported following African customs. He was in favor of "interracial" marriage, called "amalgamation" at the time, which produced, he explained in a pamphlet Treatise, healthy, beautiful children. He followed his own advice, and took four enslaved African women as concubines or common-law wives, practicing polygamy, as was common in the Muslim culture they came from, and eventually manumitting all of them. He claimed to have married one of them, and the marital status of the others does not seem to have ever been an issue. (Kingsley was not alone in this, as several other prominent Florida men had Black mistresses/common-law wives, during the second Spanish period [1783–1821].) Certainly they could not marry under Territorial Florida law, but since the women were enslaved, what Kingsley did with them did not concern anyone else. He had nine mixed-race children with these wives, and no white children. He educated his children to high standards and worked to ensure he could settle his estate on them and his wives. He encouraged his children to marry whites, his daughters to marry wealthy white men from the East.

His first wife, Anna Madgigine Jai Kingsley, was 13 years old when Kingsley purchased her in Havana in 1806; he remarked on the convenience of buying a wife. He said that he had married her, which he never said of his three other concubines or common-law wives: "celebrated and solemnized by her native African customs altho' never celebrated according to the forms of Christian usage". (Another source says that Kingsley married Anna in Africa, before she was sent or taken to Havana, and that his false testimony of having purchased her in Havana was part of a strategy to make Anna definitively free; he first had to demonstrate that she had been enslaved, before he could free her.) He emancipated Anna Jai when she turned 18, and trusted her with running his plantation when he was away on business. His children with Anna were his favorites; they were brought up in luxury, in his own home, and received excellent European educations.[6]: 154

The instability affected his business interests. Development of new cotton plantations in the Deep South in the United States, especially after Indian Removal, sharply increased the domestic demand for slaves. By 1801, Kingsley was involved in the slave trade. Kingsley began to travel to West Africa to purchase Africans to be traded as slaves between America, Brazil, and the West Indies. In 1798 he became a Danish citizen in the Danish West Indies. He continued to make his living trading slaves and shipping other goods into the 19th century, although the US prohibited the African slave trade in 1807, effective in 1808. Kingsley became a Spanish citizen in Spanish Florida in 1803, and many African slaves were smuggled into the U.S. via Florida.

As free Blacks became progressively more unwelcome in Florida, and Kingsley was unable to prevent this, for their security he moved his family to the new Black country, Haiti.

== Kingsley and Christianity ==
Although born a Quaker, Kingsley made many negative comments on the Christian religion. In his will, he asked that his body be buried "in the nearest, or most convenient place, without any religious ceremony whatsoever, and that it may be excused from the usual indiscreet formalities and parade of washing, dressing, &c., or exposure in any way, but removed just as it died to the common burying ground."

Kingsley opposed allowing the enslaved to participate in Christian religious worship. "All the late insurrections of slaves, he claimed, are to be traced to influential preachers of the gospel."

My object in this long digression is to show the danger...of superstition (by some called religion) among Negroes whose ignorance and want of rationality render them fit subjects. I purchased more new Negroes. A man calling himself a minister got among them. It was now sinful to dance, work their corn or catch fish on Sunday, or to eat catfish because they had no scales; and if they did, they would be tormented with fire and brimstone to all eternity! They became poor, ragged, hungry and disconsolate; to steal from me was only to do justice—to take from me what belonged to them because I kept them in unjust bondage.

According to Kingsley, "I encouraged dancing, merriment, and dress, for which Saturday afternoon and Sunday were dedicated, and after allowance their time was usually employed in hoeing their corn and getting a supply of fish for the week."

He made a point of remarking that his marriage to Anna, "celebrated and solemnized by her native African customs," was not Christian. Many of Kingsley's slaves were Muslims; this is also suggested in the semi-circular, crescent arrangement of the cabins, and by Kingsley's four wives. "He seems to have shared some of her [Anna's] Mohammedan principles."

== Kingsley's slaving expeditions ==
According to Kingsley, interviewed by Lydia Maria Child, he "carried on the slave trade several years" before settling. Some of his slaves were bought "on the coast of Africa"; that is where he says he bought his wife Anna, although he also said he purchased her in Havana, Cuba (see above).

== Laurel Grove ==
Spain was offering land to settlers in order to populate Florida, so Kingsley petitioned the governor for land but was turned down. After waiting, he purchased in 1803 a 2,600-acre (11 km^{2}) farm for $5,300 (equivalent to $113,950 in 2025). It was named Laurel Grove, and its main entrance was a dock on Doctors Lake. Enlarged several times, it occupied two miles along the river and lake, in its entirety where the city of Orange Park is today. (Kingsley eventually owned some 32,000 acres (130 km^{2}) in Florida, and was one of the wealthiest men in the Territory.)

Kingsley arrived with 10 slaves and began to cultivate the property immediately. Another source stated he received a substantial land grant because he brought 74 slaves to Florida; the Spaniards distributed land according to the number of slaves brought to work it. The plantation grew oranges, sea island cotton, corn, potatoes, and peas.

Kingsley's first slaves were brought from his family's plantation in South Carolina. By 1811, he had acquired a total of 100 slaves at Laurel Grove, obtained from Africa via Cuba, as Spain continued with the slave trade in its colonies. Kingsley trained the slaves at Laurel Grove in agricultural vocations to prepare them for future sale; he provided slave buyers from Georgia with skilled artisans, which allowed him to charge 50 percent more than the usual market price per slave. At Laurel Grove, there was a blacksmith shop and a carpenter's shop. Slaves were trained in blacksmithing, carpentry, and cotton ginning, as well as field work. Many of Kingsley's slaves were sold to Georgians and other planters in the Southeast; they took their purchases with them, illegally, back to the U.S., where importation of slaves was forbidden as of 1808. Kingsley is indicated with two other men as Floridians who accumulated great wealth from the Florida slave trade between 1808 and 1821.

In 1806, Kingsley, called "one of Florida's most flamboyant slaveholders", took a trip to Cuba, where he purchased Anna Madgigine Jai (born as Anta Majigeen Ndiaye), a 13-year-old Wolof girl from what is now Senegal. He married her, he said (there is no documentation), in an African ceremony in Havana soon after purchasing her. It certainly was not a Catholic marriage, and it was not legally recognized by Spanish Florida or the United States during their lives. In another statement Kingsley says he met Anna in Africa while on a slave purchasing trip.

Kingsley returned with Anna to Laurel Grove and gradually depended on her to run the plantation in his absence. although Mark Fleszar writes that interpretation of how much Anna managed Laurel Grove "deserves caution". It comes from a remark of Kingsley to abolitionist Lydia Maria Child, but other details of his life he gave her are questionable.

In 1811, Kingsley petitioned the colonial Spanish government to free Anna and their three mixed-race children, and the request was granted. The Laurel Grove plantation during one year earned $10,000 (equivalent to $193,500 in 2,025), which was an extraordinary amount for Florida. With his earnings, Kingsley purchased several locations on the opposite side of the St. Johns River, including St. Johns Bluff, San Jose, and Beauclerc in what is now Jacksonville, and Drayton Island farther south near Lake George.

After gaining freedom, Anna Kingsley was awarded five acres in Florida in a land grant by the Spanish government. She purchased slaves to help farm it.

Zephaniah Kingsley became involved in the shipping industry, including the coastwise trade, related to his large-scale domestic slave trading, which continued in the US after the Atlantic trade was prohibited. While at Laurel Grove, Kingsley was attempting to smuggle in 350 slaves (the international slave trade was abolished in 1808) when the ship was captured by the U.S. Coast Guard. Not knowing what to do with so many indigent people, the Coast Guard turned them over to Kingsley, who was the only person in the area who could care for such a number.

=== The Patriot Rebellion ===
During a short-lived insurgency that became known as the Patriot War of East Florida, in an attempt to annex Florida to the United States, American forces, American-supplied Creek, and renegades from Georgia crossed the border into the Spanish colony and began raiding the few settlements in northeast Florida. They enslaved the black people they captured. In 1813, the Americans captured Kingsley and forced him to sign an endorsement of the rebellion. John McIntosh, owner of the Fort George Plantation before Kingsley, accused him in 1826 of financially supporting the war. The accusation was likely politically motivated, as Kingsley suddenly resigned his position on the Territorial Council, and McIntosh was angry about the public treatment he had received since the war for his role in it.

The insurgents occupied Laurel Grove, using it as a base to raid other plantations and nearby towns. Kingsley left the area. After assuring her safety with the Spanish forces, Anna Jai burned the plantation house down so the rebels could not use it; she took her children and a dozen slaves aboard a Spanish gunboat to escape the conflict. For her loyalty, Anna Jai was rewarded with a grant of 350 acres (1.4 km^{2}) from the Spanish colonial government.

Under the terms of the Adams–Onís Treaty of 1819, Kingsley received, much later, $113,410 (equivalent to $2,385,308 in 2025) from the United States government for damages to Laurel Grove by the Patriots.

== Fort George Island ==
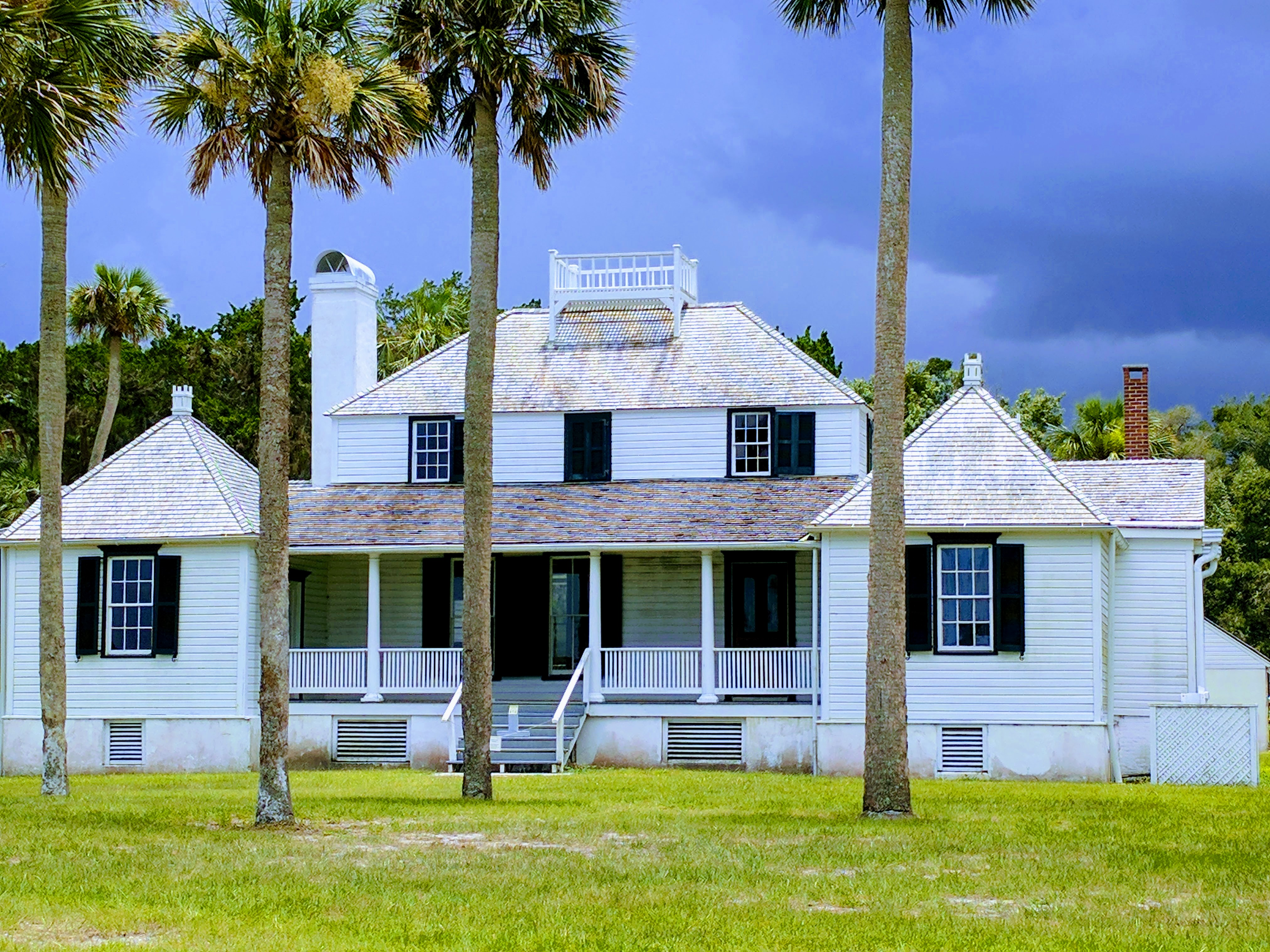
Main house, Kingsley Plantation

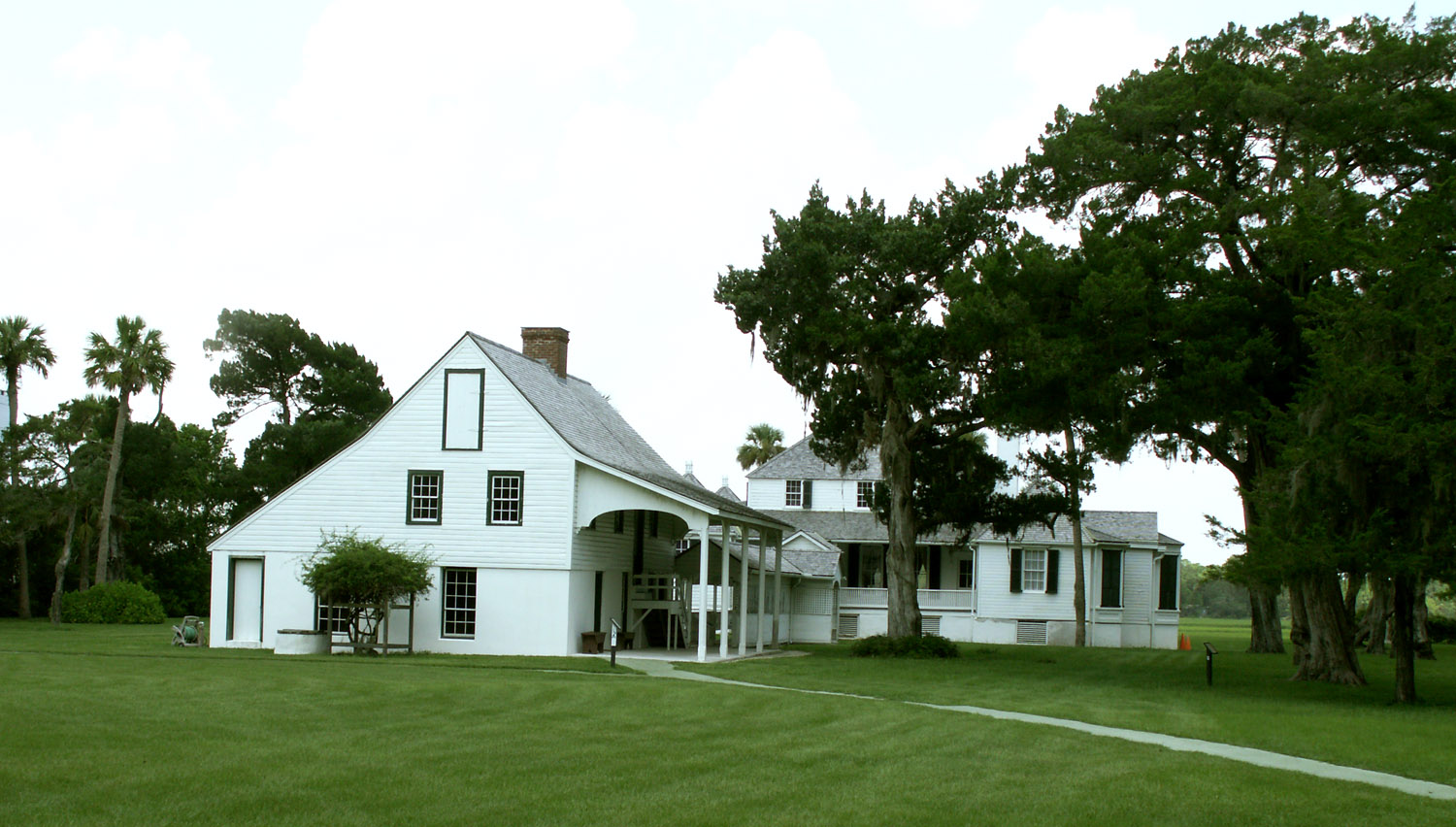
Maam Anna's apartments, now restored by the National Park Service, were above the kitchens. The rear of the main house is in the background.

Abandoning Laurel Grove, in 1814 Kingsley and Anna moved to a plantation on Fort George Island at the mouth of the St. Johns River; they lived there for 25 years. Anna and Kingsley's fourth and last child was born on Fort George Island in 1824.

Kingsley also owned and farmed, using Black labor, plantations at Springfield, Conesfield, and Drayton Island. on the latter he had extensive groves of China oranges.

A recent archeological study "has failed to substantiate claims of a sophisticated slaving business involving illegal importation, training, and smuggling of slaves at Fort George Island during the Kingsley era."

Kingsley took three much younger enslaved women as common-law wives (or concubines) and fathered children with at least two of them, totaling nine children in all. Munsila was purchased during an African trip and, like Anna before her, shared Kingsley's cabin during the trip. Flora, 20 when her relationship with Kingsley began, was the daughter of a lifelong friend. Sophy was the only other person at Laurel Grove who was from Jolof, like Anna, and only the two spoke the Jolof language. Anna and Sophy were shipmates on the trip from Africa.

Kingsley's relationships with the women have been called "complex at best". He eventually freed each of the slave women: they were named Flora Kingsley, Sarah Kingsley, who brought her son Micanopy; and Munsilna McGundo, who brought her daughter Fatima. In his will, the only woman Kingsley named as his wife was Anna. Primary documentation by Kingsley is scarce, but historians consider Flora, Sarah, and Munsila as "lesser wives", or "co-wives" with Anna. Stowell suggests "concubines" is perhaps a more accurate description of their status. Kingsley lavished all his children with affection, attention, and luxury. They were educated by the best European tutors he could find. When he entertained visitors at his Fort George plantation, Anna sat "at the head of the table"; they were "surrounded by healthy and handsome children" in a parlor decorated with portraits of African women.

The plantation featured a main house and a two-story structure called the "Ma'am Anna House". It had the main kitchen on the ground floor and living quarters on the second. Anna lived there with her children, as was the custom among the Wolof people. This also protected Kingsley from the charge of cohabitation with a Black.

Kingsley was rich, the wealthiest planter in the Territory. (After his death in 1843, his estate was valued at $77,300, equivalent to $2,670,991 in 2025.) His plantation was a great success; during one year alone it produced crops worth $10,000 (equivalent to $302,344 in 2025). The plantation produced oranges, sea island long-staple cotton, indigo, okra, and other vegetables. Approximately 60 slaves were managed under the task system: each slave had a quota of work to do per day. When they were finished, they were allowed to do what they wished. Some slaves had personal gardens which they were allowed to cultivate, and from which they sold vegetables.

Thirty-two cabins were constructed for and by the slaves, made from tabby, which made them durable, insulated, and inexpensive, although labor-intensive. The cabins were located about a quarter of a mile (400 m) from the main house. Slaves were allowed to padlock their cabins and build porches that faced away from the main house. Both of these features were unusual for slave quarters in the antebellum South.

Kingsley was a lenient slave owner:

I never interfered with their connubial concerns, nor domestic affairs, but let them regulate these after their own manner. I taught them nothing but what was useful [religion was to Kingsley "not useful"] and what I thought would add to their physical and moral happiness. I encouraged as much as possible dancing, merriment and dress, for which Saturday afternoon and night, and Sunday morning were dedicated; and, after allowance, their time was usually employed in hoeing their corn, and getting a supply of fish for the week. ... They were perfectly honest and obedient, and appeared quite happy, having no fear but that of offending me; and I hardly had occasion to apply other correction then shaming them. If I exceeded this, the punishment was quite light, for they hardly ever failed in doing their work well.

"A patriarchal feeling of affection is due to every slave from his owner, who should consider the slave as a member of his family," wrote Kingsley.

== Restrictions under a new government ==
Following the transfer of Florida from Spain to the United States in 1821, Florida's Territorial Council (the Territory's governing body) began to establish an American government. The Council focused primarily on allowing immigrants to Florida access to the 40,000,000 acres (160,000 km^{2}) ceded by Spain, and removing the Seminole to Indian Territory in keeping with the extinguishing of Indian land claims in other parts of the Southeast in this period. Americans settled in the central portion of north Florida and built productive plantations worked by slaves. The Americans imposed the binary "racial" caste system that they had developed throughout the Southeastern U.S. This system contrasted with the standing practice in which Kingsley was invested, which, based on Spanish law as implemented in Florida, supported three social tiers: whites, free people of color, and slaves. The Spanish government recognized "interracial" marriages and allowed mixed-race children to inherit property.

Territorial Governor William P. Duval recommended to President Monroe in 1822 that Kingsley be appointed to the new Council, but Monroe did not appoint him until the following year, when he was described as an "enlightened and valuable citizen of Florida" in the first book on the new Territory. He was also recommended by Joseph Marion Hernandez, Florida's nonvoting delegate to Congress before the territory was admitted as a state.

On June 2, now a member of the Territorial Council, Kingsley was appointed to a three-person committee "to consider the duties of masters of slaves and the duties of slaves and free persons of color, and the regulations necessary for their government". On June 19 Kingsley reported that the committee could not agree and asked that it be discharged. Kingsley's position was that Florida should be receptive, like Spain, to free people of color, that they should have some rights, even though less than those of whites. As he stated in a published Address to the Council, "I consider that our personal safety as well as the permanent condition of our Slave property is intimately connected with and depends much on our good policy in making it the interest of our free colored population to be attached to good order and have a friendly feeling towards the white population."

When it became apparent to Kingsley that the Council would not agree to rights for free Blacks and mixed-race people, he resigned his position. In 1824, he was no longer a member. Through the 1820s the Council began to enact strict laws separating the races, and Kingsley became worried about his future and the rights of his family to inherit from him. (Like other Southern states, Florida by 1860 abhorred free Blacks, viewing them as a threat to slavery, made their lives difficult, and encouraged them to leave the state.)

In the early 1830's Kingsley circulated a petition to President Andrew Jackson, asking him not to reappoint Duval as Territorial Governor.

== Kingsley's Treatise ==
To address these issues, in 1828 Kingsley published a pamphlet, titled A Treatise on the Patriarchal or Co-operative System of Society as it Exists in some Governments and Colonies in America, and in the United States, under the Name of Slavery, with its Necessity and Advantages. The first edition was published without his name, signed simply "An inhabitant of Florida". His name was added in the 2nd edition, with the note that he is a "slave owner", who has lived "by planting in Florida for the last twenty-five years, disavow[ing] all other motives but that of increasing the value of his property." The pamphlet had a second edition in 1829 and was reprinted again in 1833 and 1834, showing significant readership.

In it, he wrote:

Slavery is a necessary state of control from which no condition of society can be perfectly free. The term is applicable to and fits all grades and conditions in almost every point of view, whether moral, physical, or political.

Kingsley asserted that when slavery is associated with cruelty it is an abomination; when it is joined with benevolence and justice, it "easily amalgamates with the ordinary conditions of life".

He wrote that Africans were better suited than Europeans for labor in hot climates (a shared stereotype), and that their happiness was maximized when they were rigidly controlled; their contentment was greater than whites of a similar class. He asserted that people of mixed race were healthier and more beautiful than either Africans or Europeans, and considered mixed-race children, such as his own, a step against an impending race war. Although his pamphlet was published four times, all at his own expense, reception to it was mixed. While some Southerners used it to defend the institution of slavery, others believed that Kingsley's support of a free class of blacks was a prelude to abolition of slavery. Abolitionists considered Kingsley's arguments for slavery weak and wrote that logically, the planter should conclude that slavery must be eradicated. Lydia Child, a New York-based abolitionist, included Kingsley in 1836 on a list of people perpetuating the "evils of slavery".

Although Kingsley was wealthy, learned, and powerful, the treatise is believed to have contributed to the decline of his reputation in Florida. He became embroiled in a political scandal with Florida's first governor, William Duval. The governor was quoted in newspapers making scathingly critical remarks about Kingsley's motives and his mixed-race family after the planter petitioned to have Duval removed from his office for corruption. He petitioned President Andrew Jackson not to reappoint Duval as Territorial Governor. Florida's congressional delegate, Joseph M. White, called Kingsley a "respectful gentleman" and a "classical scholar", "who would consider it a degradation to be put on a footing with Governor Duval in point of intellect, or education."

== Haiti ==
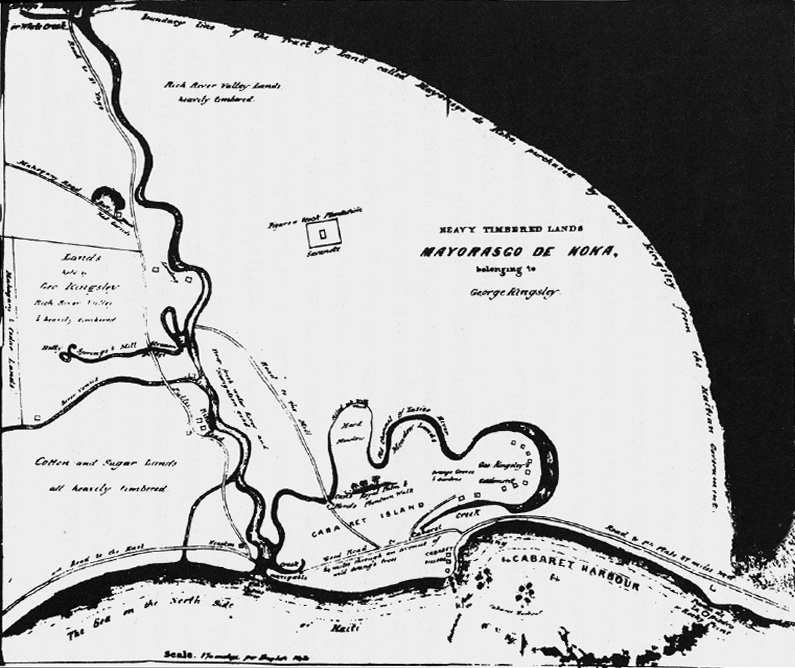
Mayorasgo de Koka, as drawn by Kingsley

After trying to persuade the new government of Florida to provide for rights for free people of color, including the right of mixed-race children to inherit property from their fathers, Kingsley began to think that the independent republic of Haiti was more conducive to what he wanted to achieve. Haiti's government was actively recruiting free Blacks from across the Americas to settle the island, offering them land and citizenship.

Kingsley highlighted its successes as a nation of free Blacks in his treatise, writing:

[U]nder a just and prudent system of management, negroes are safe, permanent, productive and growing property, and easily governed; that they are not naturally desirous of changes, but are sober, discreet, honest and obliging, are less troublesome, and possess a much better moral character than the ordinary class of corrupted whites of a similar condition.

Kingsley's praise of Haiti's new system—which outlawed slavery—combined with his defense of slavery, is notable to historian Mark Fleszar. He says that the paradox in Kingsley's thinking indicated a "disordered worldview". Kingsley was determined to create the society he had written about and defended.

Kingsley was progressively more concerned that his marriage to Anna might not be recognized in the United States, and, in the event of his death, his concubines Flora, Sarah, Munsilna McGundo, and their mixed-race children might be confiscated and sold as slaves. To prevent this he moved to Haiti. In 1835, Kingsley's son George and six of his slaves traveled to Haiti to scout for land. He found a suitable location on the northeastern shore of the island, in what is today the Puerto Plata Province of the Dominican Republic. He bought a plantation named Mayorasgo de Koka ("Primarily Coca"), which was worked by more than 50 former slaves transplanted from the Fort George Island plantation. In Haiti, the workers were contracted to work as indentured servants, who would earn full freedom after nine years of labor. Over the next two years, Kingsley relocated to Haiti with most of his extensive and complicated family. Two of his daughters stayed in Florida, as they had married local white planters.

Because of Haitian law at the time, which prohibited non-citizen whites from owning land, Zephaniah held Mayorasgo de Koka in the name of his mixed-race eldest son George Kingsley.

== Death and property disputes ==
After visiting his family in Haiti in 1843, Kingsley boarded a ship going to New York City to conduct business there. His death on the ship of pulmonary disease at 78 years old was recorded after arrival in New York City, where Kingsley was buried in a Quaker cemetery, although in his will he asked to be buried "without any Religious ceremony whatsoever."

Kingsley's will has been called "one of the [most] amazing documents to ever be probated in Duval County, Florida." It begins:

Whereas I am of sound mind and disposing memory and know what I am doing and whereas I know perfectly well that it is against the laws and conventions of life to marry a colored person, and whereas this is my property and it is not anybody's damn business what I do with it....

in the will, he expounds as follows:

And whereas I have an African wife, who is one of the finest women I have ever known and who has been true and faithful to me, and whereas I believe that the amalgamation of the white and colored races to be to the best interest of America, and whereas I know that what I am about to do i[s] going to bring down upon me tremendous criticism, but I don't give a damn. Now therefore I give to my wife.... And I further leave $10,000 to each and every child which she might have by a white husband after my death.

An inventory of his possessions, made in 1844 at Fort George, conserves the names of over 80 enslaved that he owned.

He left much of his land to his wives and children, a bequest which was immediately contested on racial grounds by his white in-laws. Kingsley's niece, Anna McNeill (Whistler's Mother; she married George Whistler, and their son James Whistler became a noted artist) was among the family members who tried to have all of Kingsley's family of African descent excluded from his heirs. Kingsley's will stipulated that no remaining slaves should be separated from their families, and that they should be given the opportunity to purchase their freedom at half their market price. Anna Madgigine Jai, who kept her African name through the marriage, returned to Florida in 1846 to oppose Kingsley's white relatives in court in Duval County. Arguing her case within the dictates of the Adams–Onís Treaty, she was successful; it was an extraordinary achievement in light of the state and local policy that was hostile toward freed slaves or blacks of any status. The records of the proceedings are virtually the only information we have on Kingsley's life in Florida.

After a brief period in Florida during the U.S. Civil War (1861–1865), Anna Jai fled to New York, as she supported the Union. After the war, she returned to Florida. Anna Madgigine Jai died in April or May 1870 on a farm in the Arlington neighborhood of Jacksonville. She was buried there in an unmarked grave.

== Post-Civil War ==
The Fort George plantation was sold soon after Kingsley's death. After the Civil War, the Freedmen's Bureau controlled the island until 1869, when it was purchased by another planter. The island changed hands under private ownership until 1955, when it was acquired by the Florida Park Service. Kingsley's house, "the oldest standing plantation house in Florida", Ma'am Anna House, and the barn survived the years relatively intact. Most of the slave quarters did as well. The National Park Service established the Timucuan Ecological and Historic Preserve in 1988 and acquired 60 acres (0.24 km^{2}) of land surrounding the Kingsley Plantation buildings in 1991.

== Writings of Zephaniah Kingsley ==
Kingsley's writings, called "eloquent" by a modern scholar, were mainly on the topic of slavery: its inevitability; how it should be governed; and how free Blacks, in his view, made a country more secure. They have been collected, edited, and thoroughly annotated by Daniel W. Stowell in Balancing Evils Judiciously: The Proslavery Writings of Zephaniah Kingsley (University Press of Florida, 2000), a volume called "deeply researched" and "gracefully presented" in a review.

The National Park Service has collected a number of pieces by or about Kingsley.

=== Pamphlets of Kingsley ===
- A Treatise on the Patriarchal, or Co-operative System of Society as it Exists in Some Governments and Colonies in America, and in the United States, Under the Name of Slavery, with its Necessity and Advantages. The first edition was of 1828. In Proslavery Writings of Zephaniah Kingsley, 39–75 (4th ed.). 1834. Internet Archive text (1829 edition).
- The Rural Code of Haïti, Literally Translated from a Publication by the Government Press; Together with Letters from that Country, Concerning Its Present Condition, by a Southern Planter. The first edition appeared in 1837. In Proslavery Writings of Zephaniah Kingsley, 86–106 (3rd ed.). New York. 1839. Internet Archive text (1838 edition).

=== Articles by Kingsley ===
- "Process of Manufacturing and Clarifying Sugar from weak or immature Juice, and of obtaining Sugar from Molasses". Southern Agriculturalist and Register of Rural Affairs. October 1830.
- "Hayti". African Repository. 14 (7): 215–217. 1838. (First published in the Christian Statesman.) This letter was discussed positively in the Cincinnati Philanthropist.
- "Emigration to Haiti". The Sun (Baltimore). November 11, 1840.

== Archival material ==
- The State Library and Archives of Florida has set up a Kingsley portal to access its collection of Kingsley-related documents and photographs, centered on his will and his Spanish land grants. It notes: "The few other records concerning Kingsley that survive are scattered across many archives and private collections including the Duval County Courthouse, the East Florida Papers and other related collections at the P.K. Yonge Library of Florida History (University of Florida), the St. Augustine Historical Society Research Library, and St. Johns County Courthouse (St. Augustine, Florida)."
- A number of documents have been transcribed and posted on the Timucuan Ecological and Historic Preserve web site.
- A number of documents are held in the Duval County Courthouse.
- In the George A. Smathers Libraries, University of Florida, Gainesville, Florida, is a collection of materials and documents on Kingley collected by Philip S. May. The material is dated 1812 to 1946; most is between 1812 and 1843.
- Unpublished letters from 1801 to 1812 to James Hamilton (1763–1829) are found among Hamilton's papers in the Duke University Library.

== Legacy ==
- The Key to the Golden Islands, by Carita Corse (University of North Carolina Press, 1931), deals with Fort George Island and Kingsley's life on it. Critics have called attention to its inaccuracies.
- Colcorton, by Edith Pope, was said by Corse to have been based on her book just cited. The theme of the novel is the taint of "racial" mixture, and features a "mixed race" female protagonist apparently based on Anna Kingsley. A ruined mansion was based on Kingsley's Fort George house.

Kingsley Avenue is in Orange Park, Florida, modern name for what had been his Laurel Grove plantation.

== See also ==
- Anna Madgigine Jai Kingsley
- Cabarete
- Doctors Lake (Florida)
- Kingsley Plantation
- Mayorasgo de Koka
- A Treatise on the Patriarchal, or Co-operative System of Society
- List of American slave traders
