= Mayorasgo de Koka =

Region in Haiti

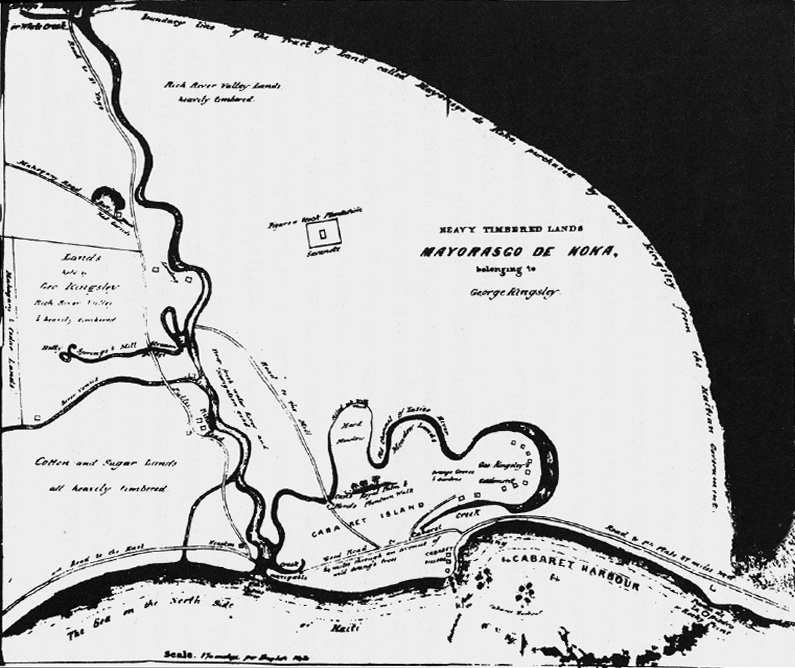
Map of Mayorasgo de Koka drawn by Zephaniah Kingsley.

Mayorasgo de Koka (literally Primogeniture of Coca, or the Entailed Estate of the Coca family) was a 35,000-acre (140 km^{2}) tract of land in northeastern Hispaniola, then under Haitian rule. After renting the rights of the land from the Haitian government in 1837, Zephaniah Kingsley purchased it in 1838. As white people were barred from land ownership in Haiti the estate was titled in the name of Zephaniah's eldest biracial son George Kingsley, whose mother was Kingsley's recognized African-born wife Anna Madgigine Jai Kingsley. Today the site is located in the province of Puerto Plata, Dominican Republic.

Beginning in 1828, the legislature of the new U.S. Territory of Florida passed a series of laws that progressively removed the rights that free persons of color had enjoyed in Spanish Florida. After failed attempts at stopping these laws through politics and advocacy, Kingsley moved his mixed-"race" family—as well as a total of 53 former slaves which he freed from his plantations in Florida—to the estate. The former slaves became indentured servants. There they were guaranteed equality by the laws of the Republic of Haiti, the first independent country in the world established by former African slaves. Anna Kingsley lived there from 1838 to 1846, when she returned to Florida.

The economy of the estate was mostly agricultural and included some mahogany logging. As the number of Kingsley descendants grew, they turned to cattle grazing and further divided the property into smaller tracts of land. Some descendants moved to urban areas and gradually lost control of the land to peasant farmers. Today, some descendants of Zephaniah Kingsley as well as of his former Florida slaves still live in the area. The village of Cabaret, within the former plantation, is today the windsurfing tourist town of Cabarete.

There are no markers and no historic buildings.
