= Vanderbilt houses =

Houses built by the Vanderbilt family

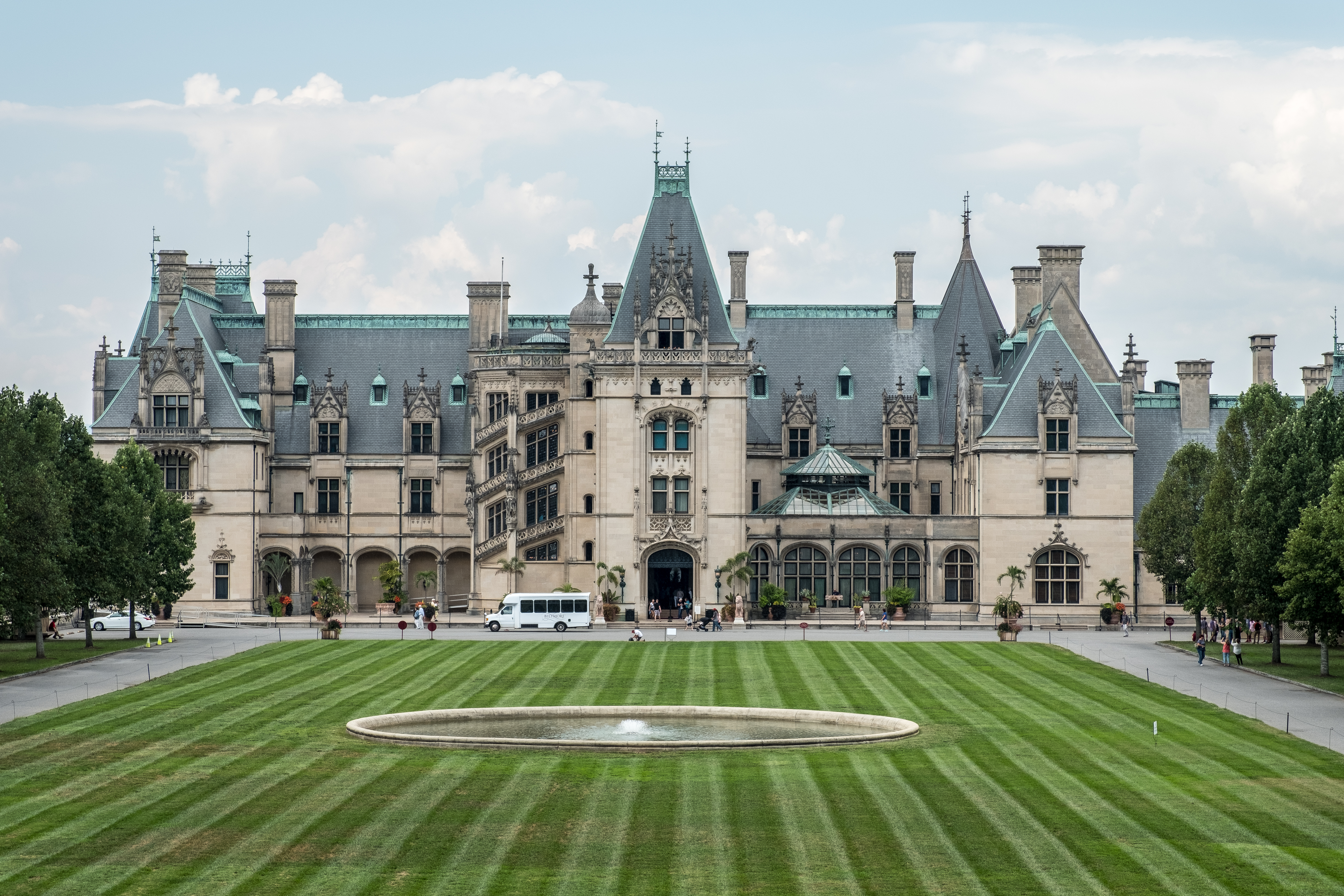
Biltmore, Asheville, North Carolina

From the late 1870s to the 1920s, the Vanderbilt family employed some of the best Beaux-Arts architects and decorators in the United States to build a notable string of townhouses in New York City and palaces on the East Coast of the United States. Many of the Vanderbilt houses are now National Historic Landmarks. Some photographs of Vanderbilt residences in New York are included in the Photographic series of American Architecture by Albert Levy (1870s).

The list of architects employed by the Vanderbilts is a "who's who" of the New York–based firms that embodied the syncretic (also called "eclectic") styles of the American Renaissance: Richard Morris Hunt; George B. Post; McKim, Mead, and White; Charles B. Atwood; Carrère and Hastings; Warren and Wetmore; Horace Trumbauer; John Russell Pope and Addison Mizner were all employed by the descendants of Cornelius Vanderbilt, who built only very modestly himself.

== Houses ==
- Cornelius Vanderbilt II (1843–1899)
  - Townhouse, the "Cornelius Vanderbilt II House" (1883) at 1 West 57th Street, Manhattan, New York, by George B. Post. Enlargements by George B. Post and Richard Morris Hunt. This mansion remains the largest private residence ever built in Manhattan. Demolished.
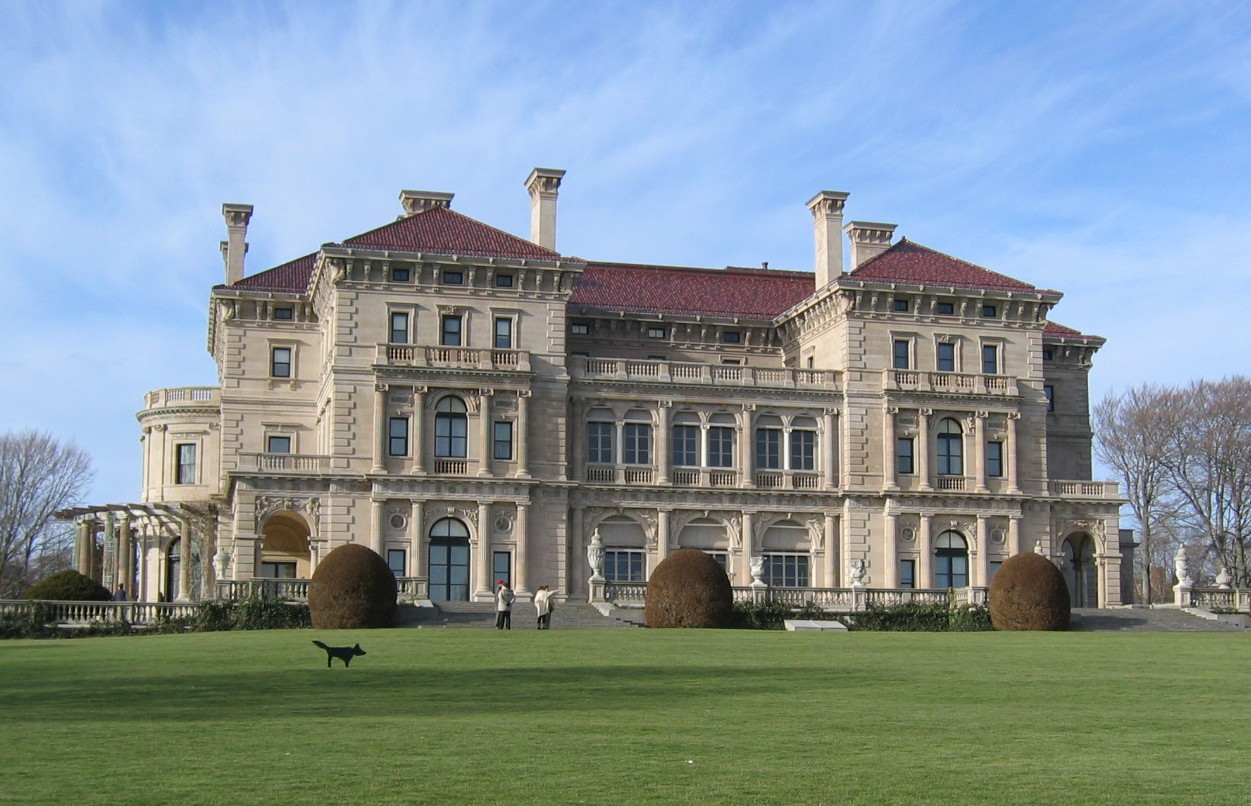
  - The Breakers, Newport, RI
    "The Breakers" in Newport, Rhode Island, in 1892 to 1895, which was also designed by Richard Morris Hunt.
  - "Oakland Farm" (1893), mansion and stables on 150 acres in Portsmouth, Rhode Island. Demolished.
- Margaret Louisa Vanderbilt Shepard (1845–1924)
  - Townhouse (1882), part of the Vanderbilt Triple Palace at 2 West 52nd Street, provided to them by her father and shared with her sister Emily Thorn Vanderbilt and their families. Demolished.
  - Woodlea (1892–1895), a Stanford White–designed country estate in Scarborough, New York, now the Sleepy Hollow Country Club.
- William Kissam Vanderbilt (1849–1920) had three houses designed by Richard Morris Hunt.
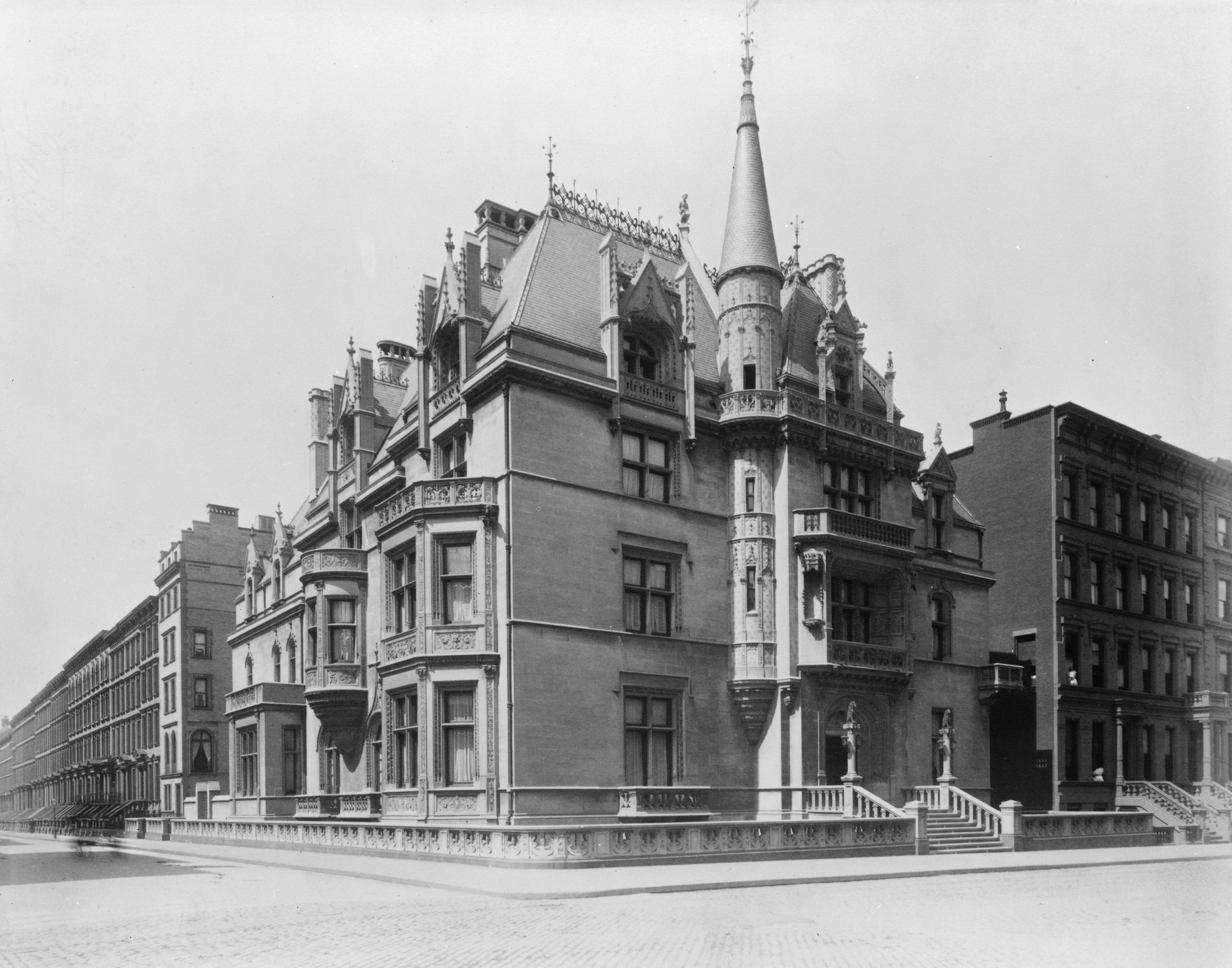
  - Petit Chateau, New York, NY
    "Petit Chateau", the New York City townhouse at 660 Fifth Avenue, built in 1882 with details drawn in part from the late-Gothic Hôtel de Cluny, Paris. Proved an influential example for other Gilded Age mansions, but was demolished in 1926.
  - "Idle Hour" country estate in Oakdale, Long Island, New York, was built in 1878–79 and destroyed by fire in 1899. A new "Idle Hour", designed by Hunt's son Richard Howland Hunt, was built on the same property from 1900–01 of brick and marble in the English Country Style and is now part of the former Dowling College campus.
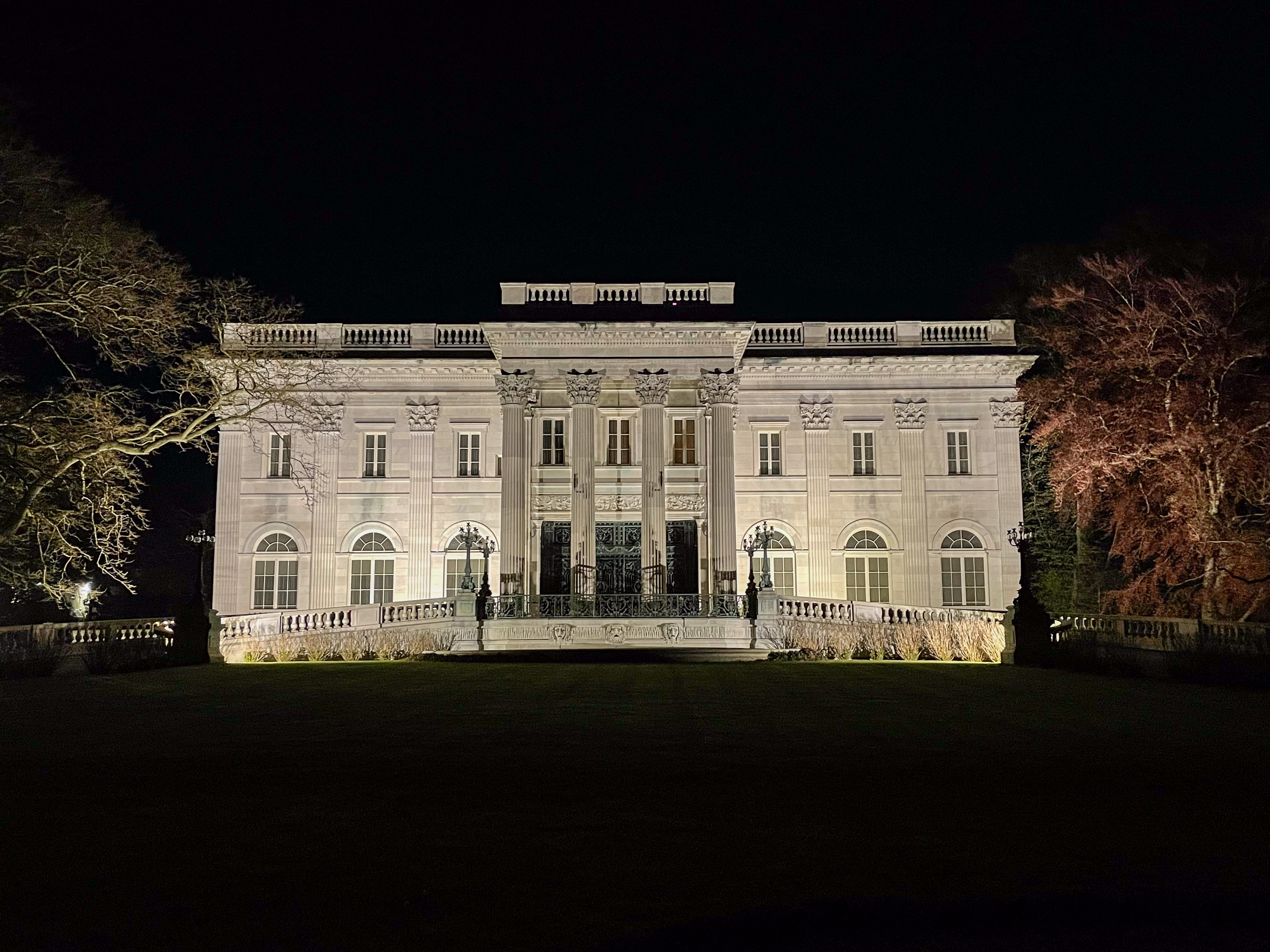
    Marble House, Newport, RI
  - "Marble House" summer home in Newport, Rhode Island, in 1888 to 1892.
  - "Château Vanderbilt", a Louis XIII style manor house built in 1907 along with three thoroughbred race tracks in Carrières-sous-Poissy, France. Designed by M. Henri Guillaume.
- Emily Thorn Vanderbilt (1852–1946), (Wife of William Douglas Sloane)
  - Townhouse (1882), 642 Fifth Avenue, part of the Vanderbilt Triple Palace, provided to them by her father. Demolished.
  - "Elm Court" in Lenox, Massachusetts, in 1887. It is the largest shingle-style house in the United States. The 1919 "Elm Court Talks," held at Elm Court, led to the creation of The League of Nations and The Treaty of Versailles.
- Florence Adele Vanderbilt Twombly (Mrs. Hamilton Twombly) (1854–1952)
  - Townhouse at 684 Fifth Avenue, New York (1883). Designed by John B. Snook, who also designed her sister Lila Webb's townhouse next door. Demolished.
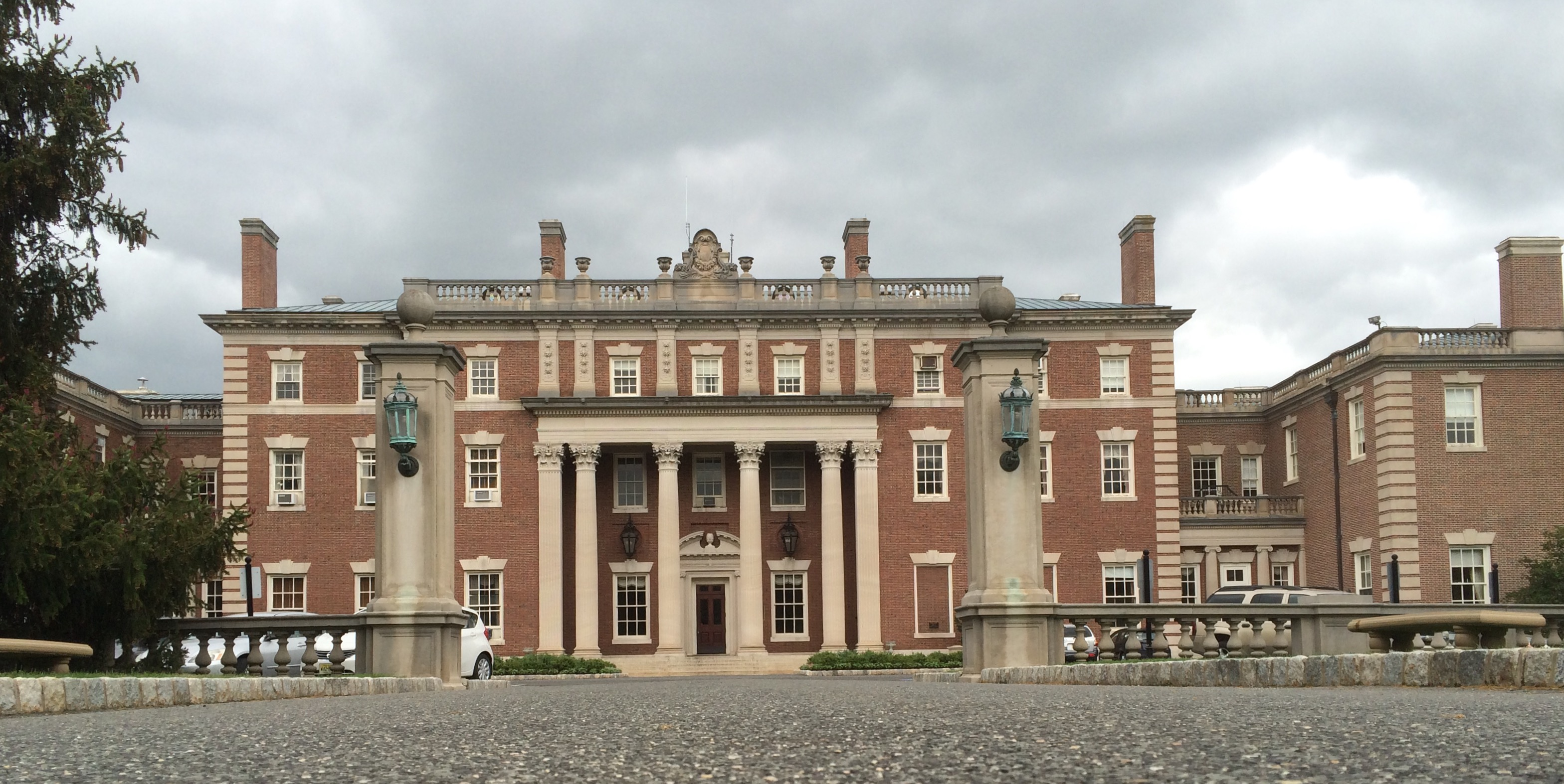
  - Florham, Convent Station, NJ,
    "Florham" in Convent Station, New Jersey, in 1894 to 1897. Designed by McKim, Mead and White as a summer estate, it is now used for classrooms, faculty offices, and administration at Fairleigh Dickinson University
  - "Vinland" in Newport, Rhode Island. Renovated by Ogden Codman Jr. Now part of the Salve Regina University
  - Townhouse, her second, a 70-room house at 1 East 71st Street, New York. Designed by Whitney Warren. Demolished.
- Frederick William Vanderbilt (1856–1938)
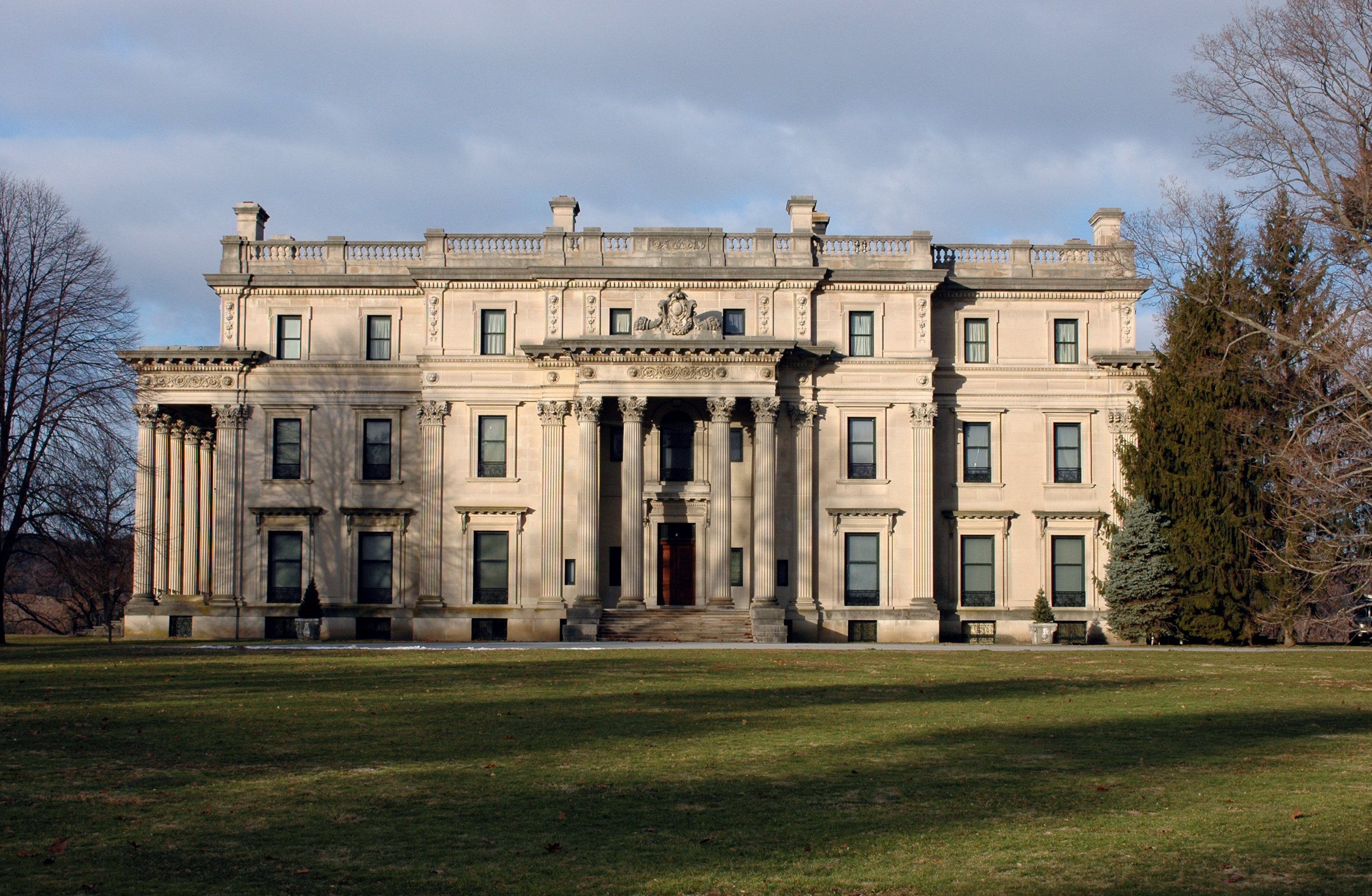
  - Hyde Park, Hyde Park, NY
    "Hyde Park" in Hyde Park, New York. Designed by McKim, Mead and White and built in 1896–1899, it is now the Vanderbilt Mansion National Historic Site.
  - "Rough Point" in Newport, Rhode Island, designed by Peabody and Stearns built in 1892.
  - "Pine Tree Point", Adirondack Great Camp on Upper St. Regis Lake in 1901
  - "Sonogee" (1903) in Bar Harbor, Maine, purchased and renovated in 1915.
- Eliza Osgood Vanderbilt Webb, a.k.a. Lila Vanderbilt Webb (1860–1936)
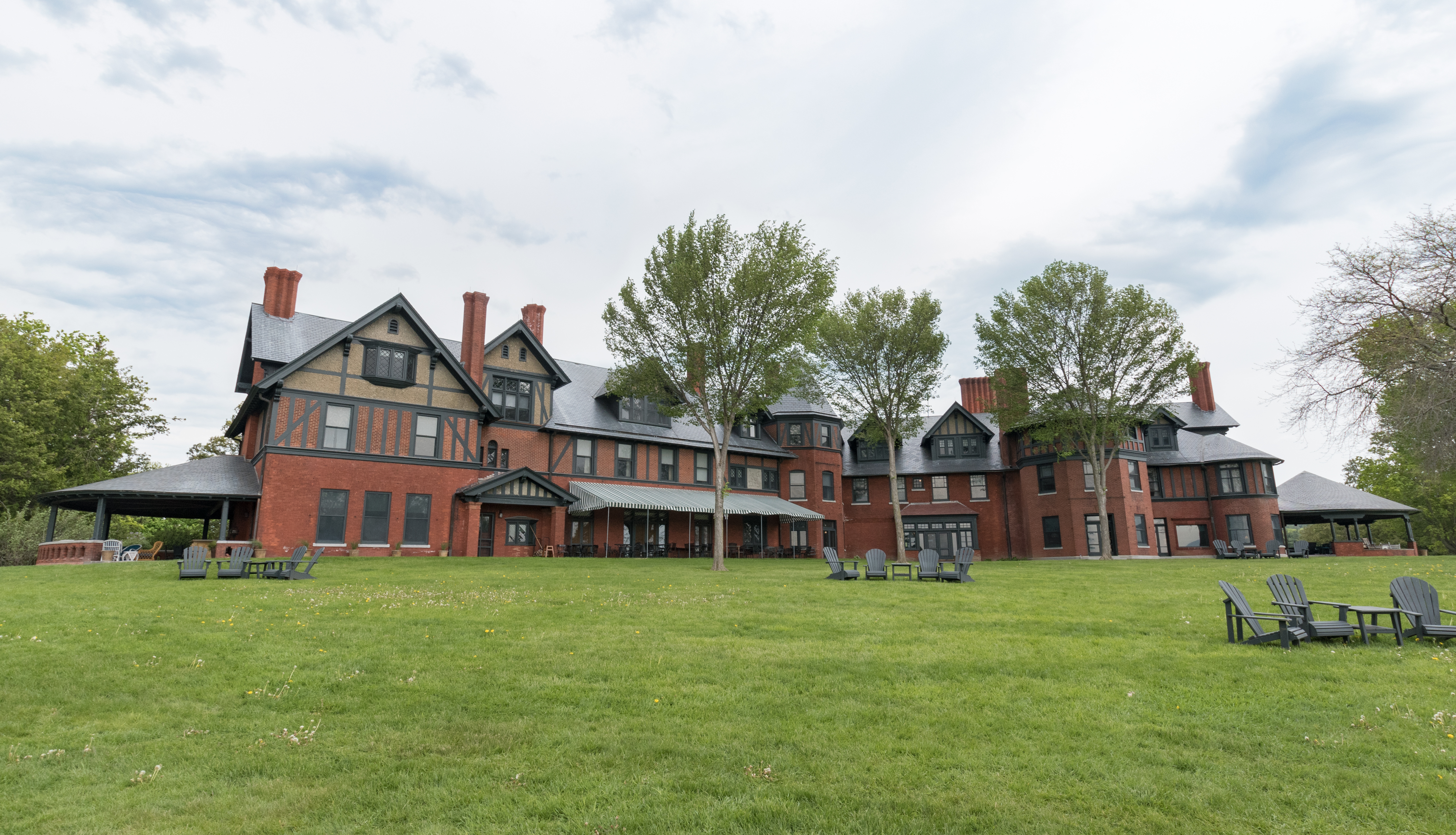
  - Shelburne Farms, Shelburne, VT
    "Shelburne Farms" in Shelburne, Vermont, built in 1899.
  - Townhouse (1883) at 680 Fifth Avenue, New York. The house was a wedding gift from William H. Vanderbilt to his daughter. Demolished.
  - "NaHaSaNe" (1893), the 115,000 acre Great Camp located on Lake Lila in the Adirondacks.
- George Washington Vanderbilt II (1862–1914),
  - Townhouse (1887) at 9 West 53rd Street in New York City. Designed by Richard Morris Hunt. Demolished.
  - "Biltmore" in Asheville, North Carolina, in 1888 to 1895. Designed by Hunt, it is the largest house in the United States
  - George Washington Vanderbilt Houses, 645 and 647 Fifth Avenue, New York, called the "Marble Twins". 1902 to 1905. Number 647 survives, a designated landmark, as the flagship store for Versace; the site of 645 is now Olympic Tower.
  - "Pointe d'Acadie" (1869), the Bar Harbor, Maine cottage purchased and renovated in 1889. Demolished 1952
- William Kissam Vanderbilt II (1878–1944)
  - Townhouse at 660 Fifth Avenue (1905) designed by Stanford White, directly north of his parents' Petit Chateau. Demolished.
  - "Deepdale" (1904), country estate in Lake Success, New York, on Long Island. Designed by Horace Trumbauer and Carrère and Hastings.
  - Eagle’s Nest, Centerport, NY
    "Eagle’s Nest", in 1910 to 1936, at Centerport, New York, designed by Warren and Wetmore.
  - "Alva Base" (1941), winter estate on Fisher Island, Florida
- Consuelo Vanderbilt (1877–1964)
  - "Casa Alva" (1934), winter residence on Palm Beach, Florida. Designed by Maurice Fatio. Consuelo Vanderbilt sold the house in 1957.
  - "Cara-Mia" (1900), residence in Southampton, New York
  - "Sunderland House" (1904), townhouse in London, England
- Harold Stirling Vanderbilt (1884–1970)
  - "Rock Cliff" (1870), summer residence in Newport, Rhode Island.
  - "Eastover" (1930), winter residence in Manalapan, Florida. Designed by Maurice Fatio.
- Reginald Claypoole Vanderbilt (1880–1925)
  - "Sandy Point Farm" (1902), mansion and stables in Portsmouth, Rhode Island. Reginald Claypoole Vanderbilt was very interested in horses and was involved in many different equestrian organizations.
  - Townhouse (1896) at 12 East 77th Street in Manhattan, New York.
- Cornelius Vanderbilt III (1873–1942)
  - Townhouse (1882) part of the Triple Palace at 640 Fifth Avenue in Manhattan, New York. The house was completely renovated in 1914 by Grace Vanderbilt at a cost of $500,000. Demolished c. 1945.
  - "Beaulieu" (1859), summer residence in Newport, Rhode Island. Bought by Vanderbilt in 1911.
- Alfred Gwynne Vanderbilt (1877–1915)
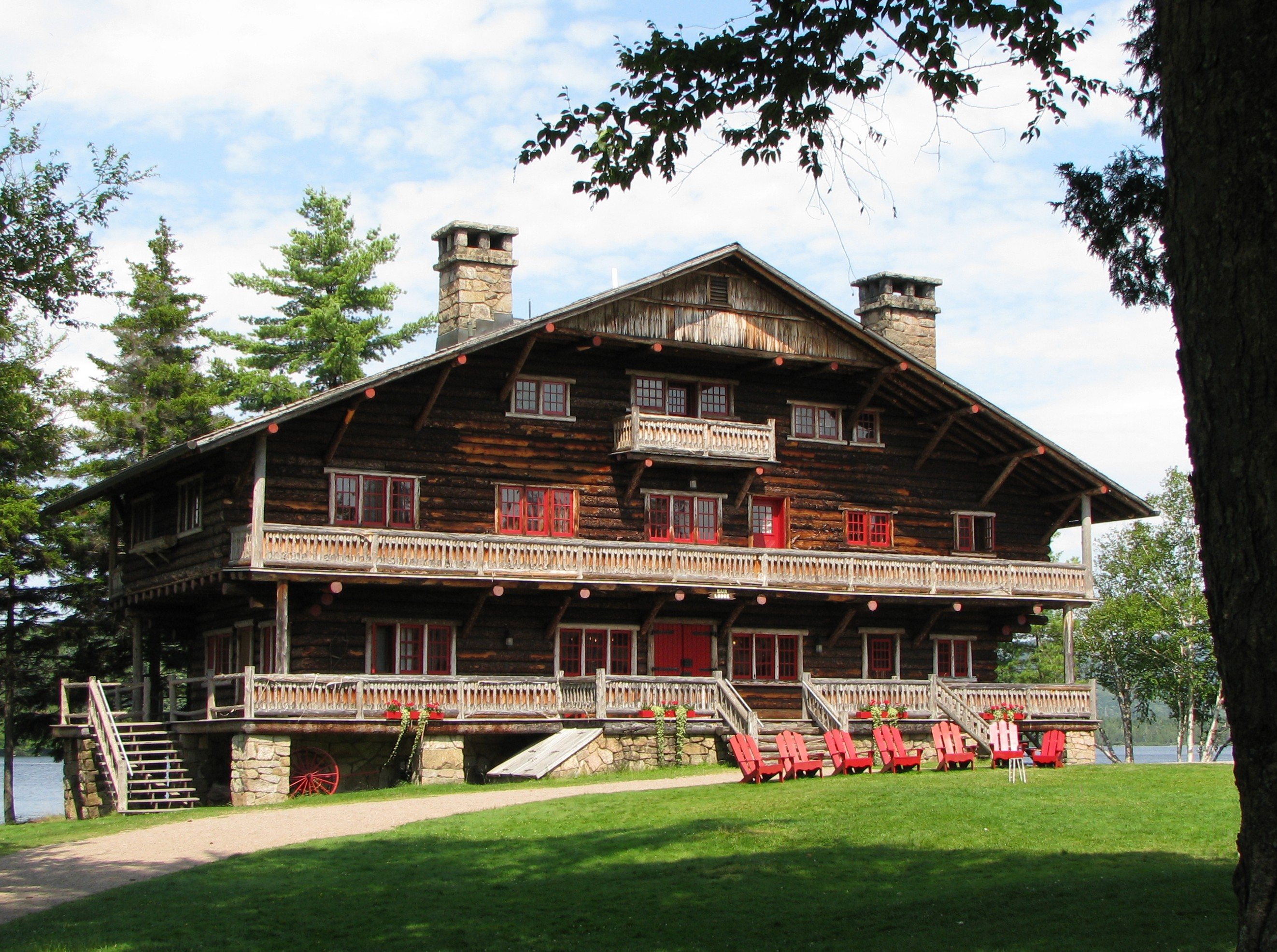
  - Sagamore Camp, Hamilton County, NY
    "Sagamore Camp" (1897), great camp in the Adirondack Mountains.
  - "Oakland Farm" (remodeled and expanded 1901), Portsmouth, Rhode Island, colonial era home he transformed into a summer home.
  - "Vanderbilt Hotel" (1913), a hotel in Manhattan, New York, on Park Avenue and 34th Street. The penthouse served as a city residence for him.
- Gladys Vanderbilt Széchenyi (1886–1965) She was the wife of Count László Széchenyi
  - "Oermezo Castle" (1700), 4,000 acre country estate in Zemplén County, Hungary.
  - "Lagoshara Pusbla" 4,300 acres, summer estate in County of Somogy, Hungary.
  - Townhouse at 14 Eotvos Street in Budapest, Hungary.
- Gertrude Vanderbilt Whitney (1875–1942)
  - "William C. Whitney Mansion" (1883) townhouse at 871 Fifth Avenue in Manhattan, New York. Demolished.
  - "The Reef" (1885), summer residence in Newport, Rhode Island.
  - "Applegreen" (1902), residence in Old Westbury, New York.
