= Mellen Clark Greeley =

American architect

Mellen Clark Greeley (14 February 1880 – 4. September 1981) was an American architect in Jacksonville, Florida. He was considered to be the "Dean of Jacksonville Architects".

== Early life and military service ==
Greeley grew up in Jacksonville, but went away to boarding school for high school. In 1898, Greeley volunteered for the Spanish–American War and was sent to Cuba as part of the 3rd U. S. Volunteer Engineer Regiment. After the war he stayed in the reserves (Florida national Guard) and served again as a lieutenant and then captain in the Quartermaster Corps in France during World War I.

== Architect ==
Greeley apprenticed for draftsman J. H. W. Hawkins from 1901 to 1908 and opened his own practice in 1909. After his service in World War I, he joined Roy A. Benjamin, and they worked together for five years. He helped establish the Florida Association of Architects in 1912. Greeley was active in political issues and helped establish the Florida Board of Architecture in 1915, serving as its secretary from 1923 to 1955. He also worked with zoning commissions and other regulators on things ranging from electrical codes to the management of hotel commissions.

== Works ==
- Mellen Clark Greeley House (1905) at 2561 Oak Street
- Old Stanton High School
- Woman's Club of Jacksonville, style: Tudor Revival.
- Fenimore and Hartmore Apartments with Roy A. Benjamin
- Dr. Charles E. Terry Residence at 2959 St. Johns Avenue
- George Couper Gibbs Residence at 2717 Riverside Avenue
- John L. Roe Residence at 399 Beach Avenue in Atlantic Beach, Florida
- 1816 Avondale Circle
- 1876 River Road
- 4061 Timuquana Road
- Ribault Club on Fort George Island, Florida. Credited to Maurice Fatio and Greeley. Colonial Revival architecture.
- Church of the Good Shepherd (as associate architect) and later as architect of the remodel
- Government House, in St. Augustine, Florida (1937 Works Progress Administration remodel)

== See also ==
- Architecture of Jacksonville
