= Gertrude Conaway Vanderbilt =

American socialite and philanthropist

- Born: Gertrude Lewis Conaway; 1901; Philadelphia, Pennsylvania, U.S.
- Died: August 6, 1978 (aged 76–77); Newport, Rhode Island, U.S.
- Resting place: St. Mary's Cemetery, Portsmouth, Rhode Island, U.S.
- Occupations: Socialite, philanthropist
- Spouse: Harold Stirling Vanderbilt
- Parent: John L. Conaway
- Relatives: W. Barklie Henry (stepfather); William Kissam Vanderbilt (father-in-law); Alva Belmont (mother-in-law); Consuelo Vanderbilt (sister-in-law)

Gertrude Conaway Vanderbilt (1901 – August 6, 1978) was an American socialite and philanthropist. She was one of the first women to compete in the America's Cup, alongside her husband, Harold Stirling Vanderbilt, in 1934 and 1937.

== Early life ==
Gertrude Conaway was born in 1901 in Philadelphia. Her father, John L. Conaway, was "a famous horseman," however he died when she was 10. Her stepfather, W. Barklie Henry, was a banker and yachtsman.

Conaway grew up in Philadelphia, where she acted in amateur theatre.

== Yachting and philanthropy ==
Vanderbilt was one of the first women allowed to compete in the America's Cup. She was allowed aboard her husband's yachts during the 1934 America's Cup and the 1937 America's Cup.

Vanderbilt served on the board of trust of Vanderbilt University, a private university in Nashville, Tennessee, as an honorary trustee. She endowed scholarships in the English department.

Vanderbilt bequeathed $1 million to the Newport Hospital, $1 million to the JFK Medical Center in Atlantis, Florida, $200,000 to the Shenandoah County Memorial Hospital in Woodstock, Virginia, and $100,000 to the NewYork–Presbyterian Hospital. She also donated $1.25 million to the Preservation Society of Newport County, an organization to protect the architectural heritage of Newport County, Rhode Island.

== Personal life and death ==
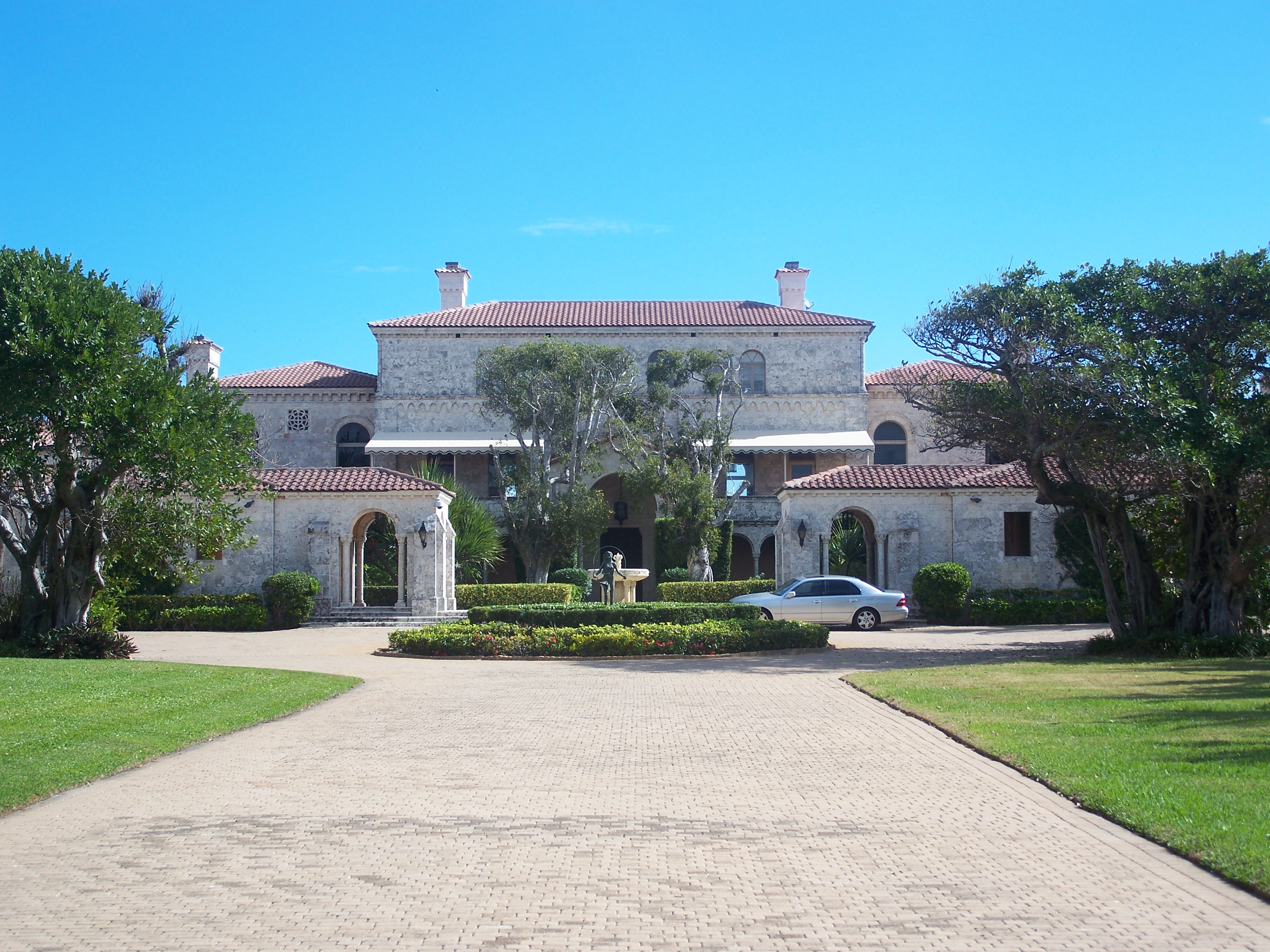
Eastover.

Conaway married Harold Stirling Vanderbilt on August 20, 1933, in New York City; he was 17 years older than she. They never had children. They resided in New York City and at Eastover, a property in Manalapan, Florida near Palm Beach designed by architect Maurice Fatio. They summered at Rock Cliff, an estate in Newport, Rhode Island that they purchased in 1961. When her husband died in 1970, Vanderbilt inherited over $1 million as well as $15 million in trust funds.

Vanderbilt died on August 8, 1978, in Newport, Rhode Island. Her funeral was held at Trinity Church, and she was buried in St. Mary's Cemetery, Portsmouth, Rhode Island.

In addition to her charitable bequests, she bequeathed a portion of her wealth to the grandchilren of her late husband's sister Consuelo Vanderbilt, including:

- $100,000 outright and a $400,000 Trust Fund Consuelo’s grandson John Spencer-Churchill, 11th Duke of Marlborough;
- A Trust Fund of $1,000,000 to Lord Charles Spencer-Churchill;
- $100,000 to Lady Sarah Roubanis;
- $200,000 to Lady Caroline Waterhouse; and,
- $200,000 to Lady Rosemary Muir.
