= Quaker City (disambiguation) =

Quaker City, Ohio, is a village in the United States.

Quaker City may also refer to:

- Quaker City, Pennsylvania, United States
- Quaker City (sound system), a UK sound system based in Birmingham
- The Quaker City, or The Monks of Monk Hall, a novel by George Lippard
- USS Quaker City (1854), steamship featured in Mark Twain's travelogue The Innocents Abroad
- The Quaker City, a nickname for Philadelphia, Pennsylvania
- Quaker City, a train operated by Amtrak as part of the Clocker service
