= W. Barklie Henry =

American stockbroker and yachtsman (1867–1930)

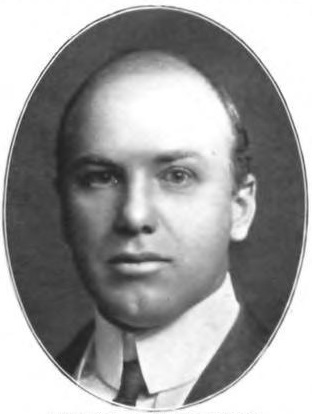
- From 1902's Philadelphia and Notable Philadelphians
- Born: William Barklie Henry; December 5, 1867; Quaker City, Pennsylvania, U.S.
- Died: December 24, 1930 (aged 63); Palm Beach, Florida, U.S.
- Education: St. Paul's School
- Alma mater: University of Pennsylvania
- Occupation(s): Banker, yachtsman
- Spouses: Alice Belknap; Mary Pancoast Conaway
- Children: 2
- Relatives: Harry Payne Whitney (daughter-in-law's father); Gertrude Conaway Vanderbilt (stepdaughter); William W. Belknap (father-in-law)

William Barklie Henry (December 5, 1867 – December 24, 1930) was an American stockbroker and yachtsman. He became a millionaire as the co-founder of Henry & West, later known as West & Company, a brokerage firm in Philadelphia. Described as "one of the most expert yachting sailors" in the United States, he was a member of the Corinthian Yacht Club of Philadelphia and the New York Yacht Club, winning many yachting races held off the coast of Long Island.

== Early life ==
Henry was born December 5, 1867, in Quaker City, Pennsylvania. His father, Morton Henry, was an attorney. One of his cousins married Anthony Joseph Drexel Jr., son of Anthony Joseph Drexel, investment banker and the founder of Drexel University.

Henry was educated at St. Paul's School. He graduated from the University of Pennsylvania in 1889.

== Career ==
Henry began his career as the president of the Standard Supply & Equipment Company. The company was a supplier of goods to the railroads. In 1910, Henry co-founded Henry & West, a brokerage firm, with William West. Their office was on Walnut Street in Philadelphia. Henry remained a partner until 1914. It later became known as West & Company. Henry became a millionaire.

During World War I, Henry joined the United States Navy, where he served as lieutenant commander of the secret service division of the 4th naval district. He became a member of the Military Order of Foreign Wars.

Henry was a yachtsman. He was a member of the Corinthian Yacht Club of Philadelphia, where he served as rear commodore, and the New York Yacht Club. He was the winner of many yachting races held off the coast of Long Island. He was described by The Philadelphia Inquirer as "one of the most expert yachting sailors" in the United States.

== Personal life, death and legacy ==
Henry was married twice. He first married Alice Belknap (1874–1962), daughter of the 30th United States Secretary of War, Brigadier General William W. Belknap, on June 7, 1898. They had a son, Barklie McKee Henry (1902-1966), who married Barbara, the daughter of Harry Payne Whitney and a daughter, Alice Ellen (1906-1989), who married Hans von Briesen. Henry's marriage to Belknap ended in divorce.

His second wife, Mary Faris Pancoast Conaway, was the widow of John L. Conaway, a renowned horseman. They wed in Bar Harbor, Maine in 1912. They resided at Pine Cottage in Rosemont. She predeceased him on July 20, 1930, in England. Henry was a member of the Philadelphia Club and the Racquet Club of Philadelphia.

Henry died on December 24, 1930, in Palm Beach, Florida, at 63. His stepdaughter, Gertrude Conaway Vanderbilt, married yachtsman Harold Stirling Vanderbilt in 1933, and she became a socialite and philanthropist.
