= Fort George Island =

Island in Duval County, Florida, US

Coordinates: 30.4199°N 81.4403°W

For the island in James Bay, Canada, see Chisasibi.

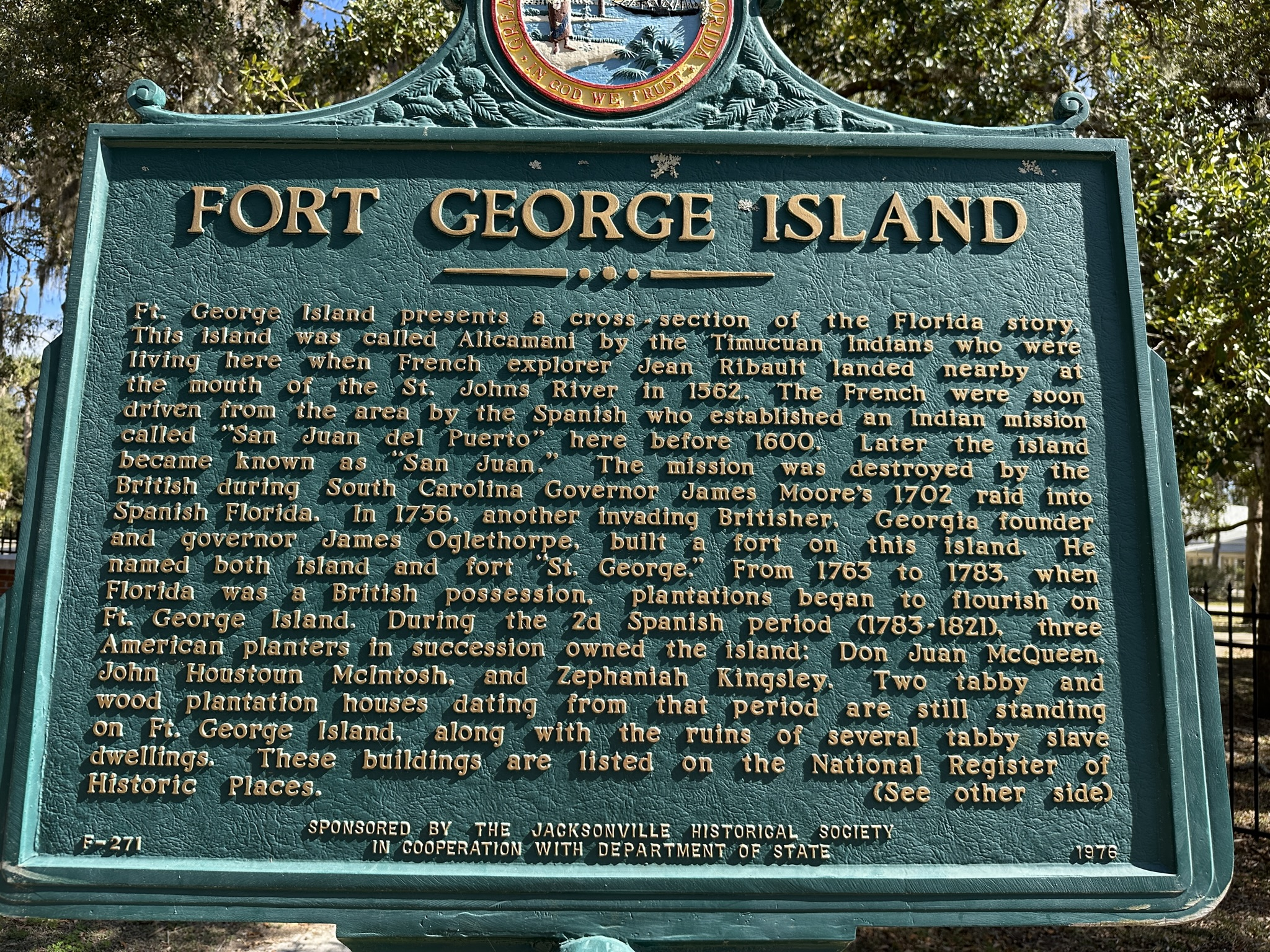
Fort George Island Historical Marker

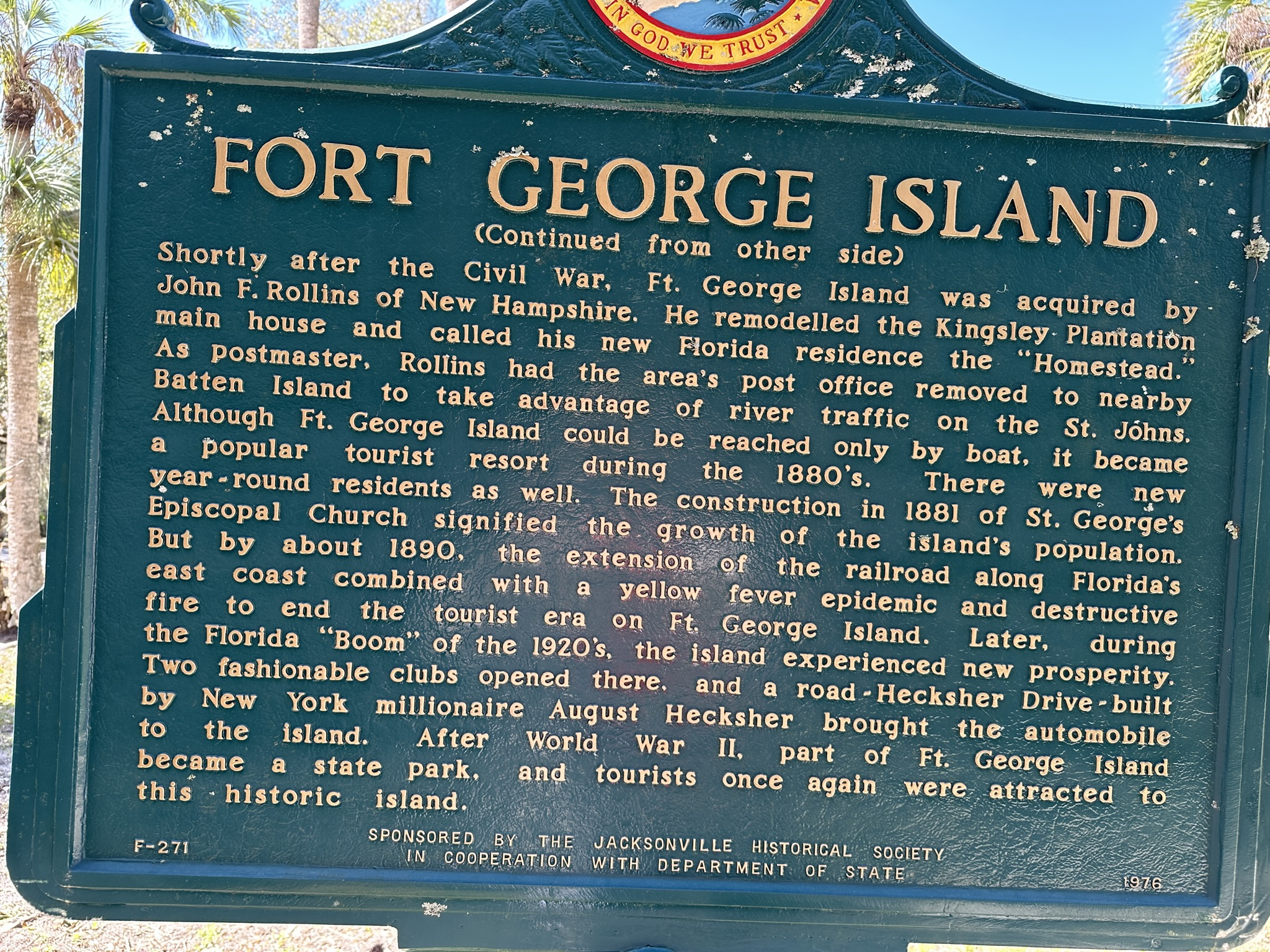
Fort George Island Historical Marker (reverse)

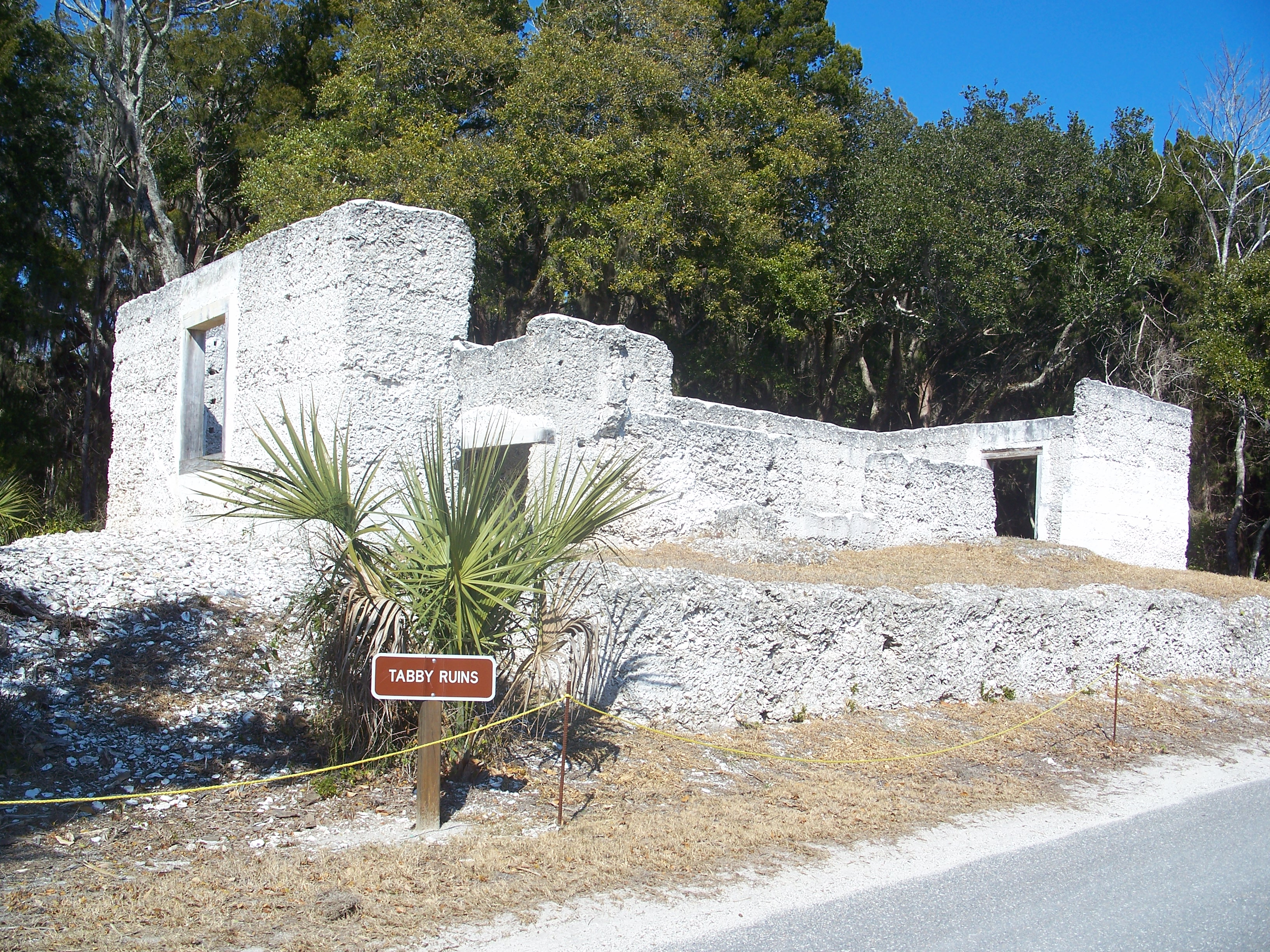
Tabby ruins of uncompleted building built by Charles Thompson in 1854, Fort George Island

Fort George Island is an island of some 500 acres (200 ha), about 5 miles (8.0 km) long, near the mouth of the St. John's River, in far northeast Duval County/Jacksonville, Florida. Part of the island is part of the 46,000-acre (190 km^{2}) Timucuan Ecological and Historic Preserve, celebrating the Native American population that was largely wiped out by infectious diseases brought by the Europeans. Fort George has the highest point along the Atlantic coast south of New Jersey. Fort George Island Cultural State Park covers part of the island.

In prehistoric times it was a center of the Native American Timacua people, who left huge oyster shell mounds, which were used in the nineteenth century to create tabby concrete, present in the foundations of several island buildings. The Spaniards founded a mission to Christianize the natives; a friar there, Francisco Pareja, studied their language and left in his writings most of what we know about it. Under Zephaniah Kingsley, who farmed much of the island from 1814 to 1836, it was a slave training and trading center. Later in the nineteenth century it hosted the luxurious Fort George Hotel as well as a club for locals. In the twenty-first century it contains an important historical site, the Kingsley Plantation, on federal park land (part of the Timucuan Ecological and Historic Preserve), and a small state park hosts the Ribault Inn Club, which serves as a visitors' center for the Kingsley Plantation and the island as a whole.

It has the Mayport - Fort George ferry.

== The Timucuans ==
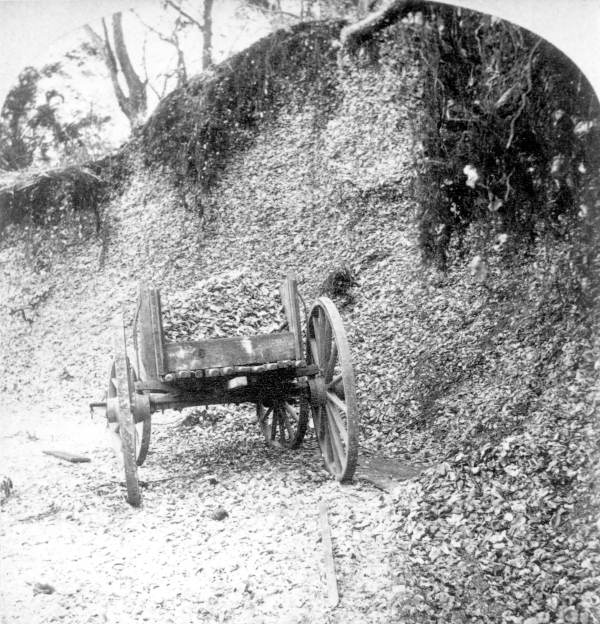
Fort George Island shell mound, 1870

During the early historical period Fort George Island was the location of the village of Alicamani, a major village of the Timucua chiefdom known as the Saturiwa. Timucua influence is noted by the presence of middens, large mounds consisting of massive quantities of shells and discarded food byproducts. On Fort George Island, the shells were primarily oysters.

Quantities of the shells were burned and mixed to form tabby concrete, a durable building material used in the Kingsley slave quarters and in the foundations of other buildings on the island.

== Mission of San Juan del Puerto ==
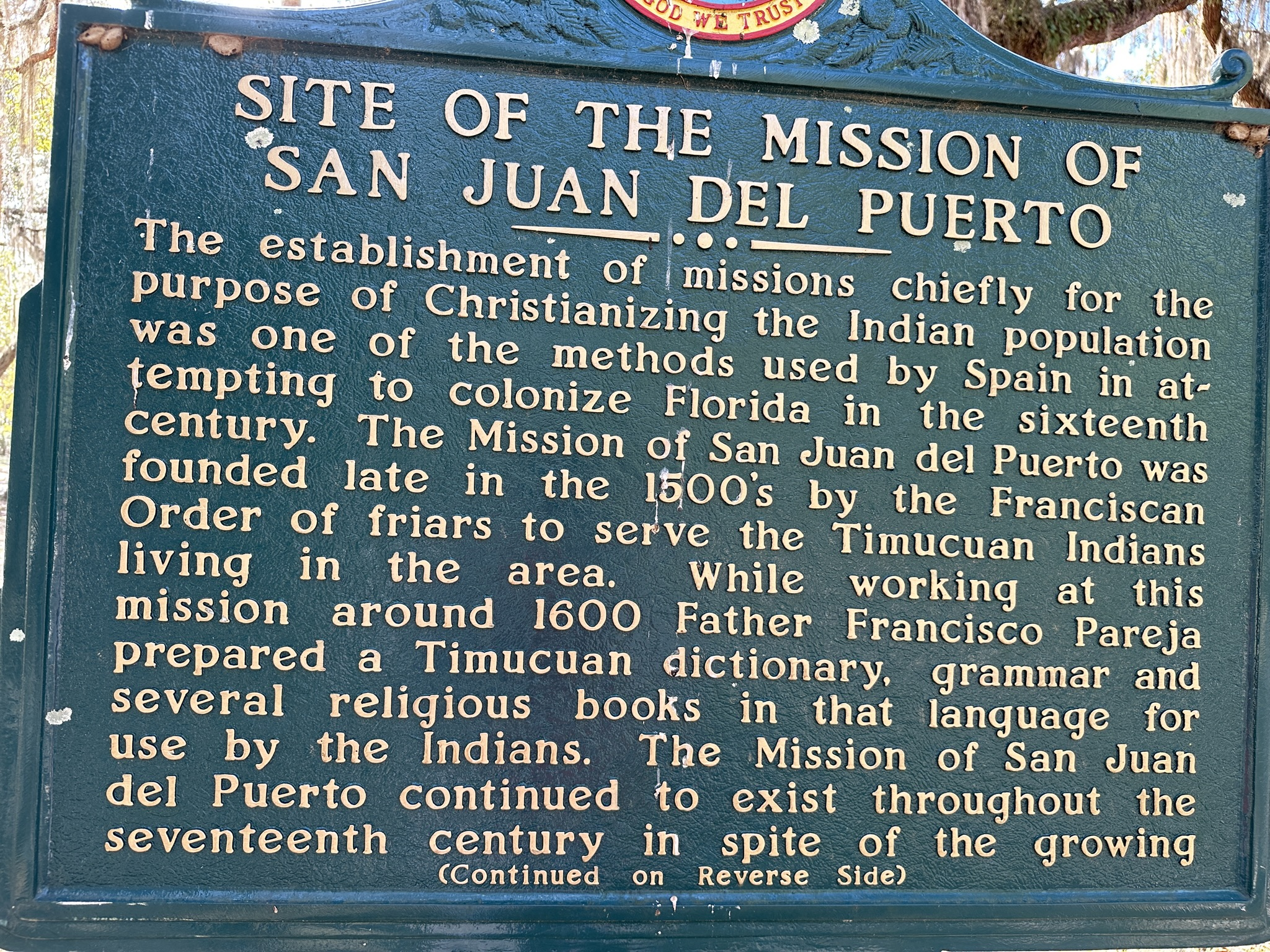
Marker, Mission of San Juan del Puerto

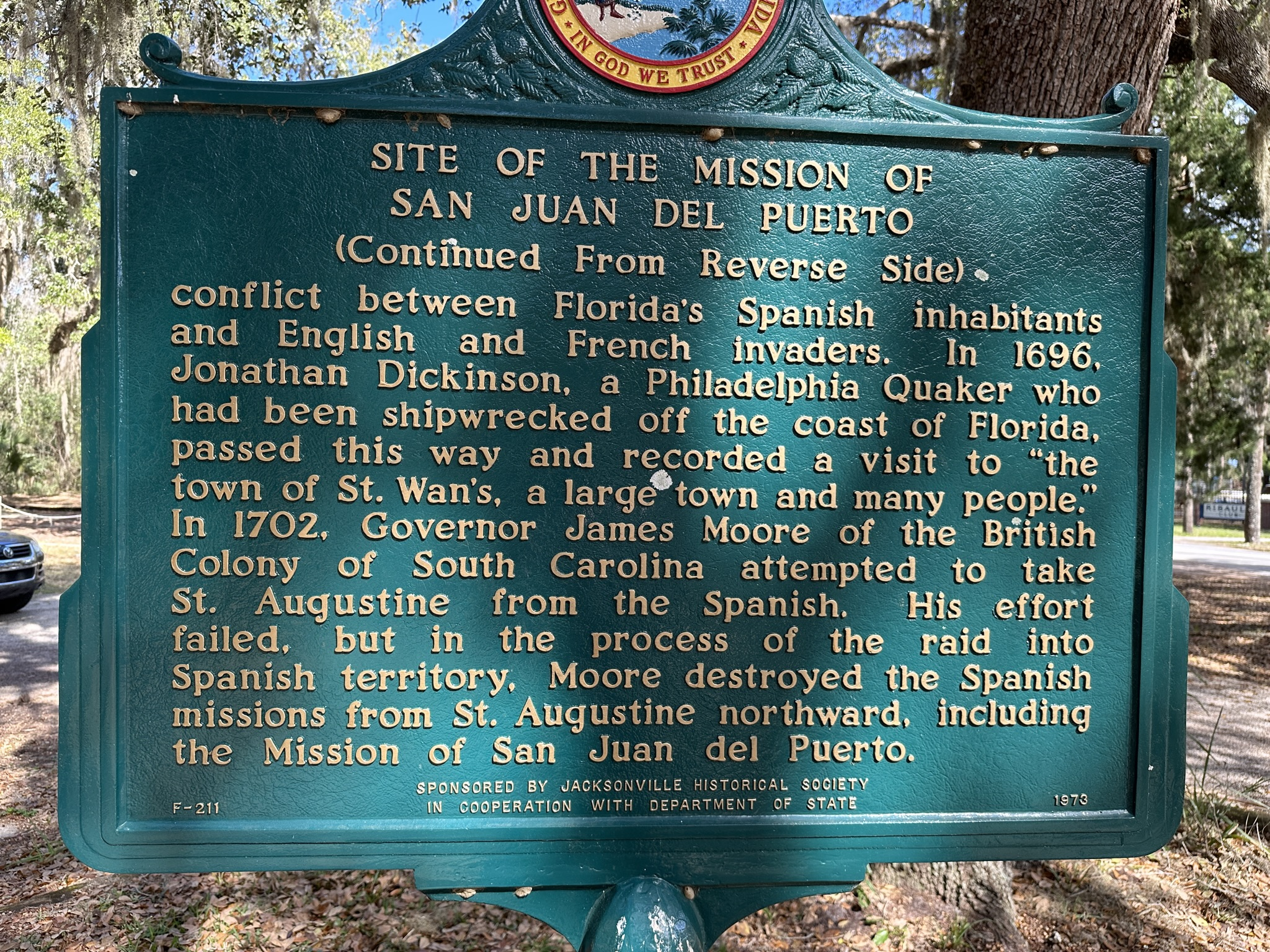
Marker, Mission of San Juan del Puerto (reverse)

Because the native villages were so large, Spaniards chose a nearby site for a mission to assist in Christianizing the natives. The Mission of San Juan del Puerto was started in the later sixteenth century and dominated the area until 1702, when it was destroyed by the English. The mission's location was near the Ribault Club, where there is a historical marker.

The Franciscan friar Francisco Pareja lived at San Juan del Puerto for years, and compiled there his books on the Timucua language, published in Mexico.

== Fort George ==
In 1736 James Oglethorpe built Fort George, giving the island its present name. It was razed to the ground and its location is not known precisely, but according to a writer of 1887, "Along the southeastern extremity of Fort George Island there stretches a long, wide sand-spit, flanked upon the land side by knolls, rising both above the beach and the salt meadows, which are covered with long grasses and clumps of verdure. On one of these knolls was, in my opinion, the spot where the fort stood."

Florida was an English colony from 1763 to 1783, and British planters started developing the island.

== Kingsley Plantation ==
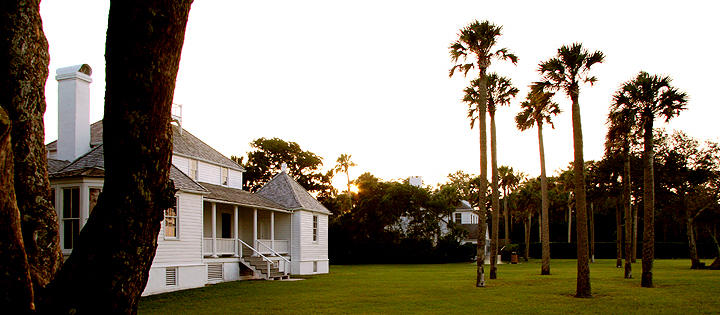
Main building on the Kingsley Plantation, front facing the water

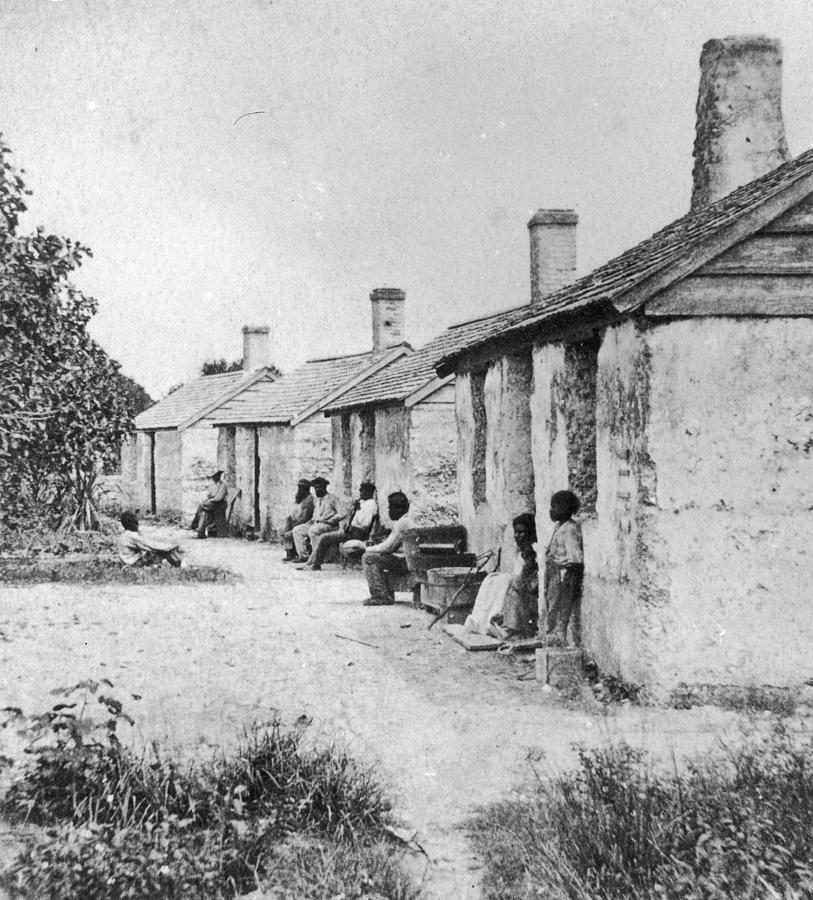
Kingsley Plantation tabby slave quarters. Note that in an African pattern, the buildings are in a semi-circle, with Kingsley's residence at the center of the circle.

The most important of the planters was Zephaniah Kingsley, referred to after his death as the "King of Fort George", who leased and then owned the entire island from 1814 until 1839. The writer of 1878 described him as "a man of marked originality and force of character, shrewd, canny, a law unto himself."

Kingsley was a slave dealer, who owned schooners that brought slaves clandestinely from Africa to his plantations. Kingsley publicly defended slavery and by the standards of the time, treated his slaves very liberally, and he was respected by them. (His concubine or wife Flora called him "kind".) Kingsley, who preferred Black company to white and eventually became a Haitian citizen, let his slave recreate an African village. His four wives each had a separate house on Fort George Island. Worried about the future safety of his Black wives (whom he freed) and children, Kingsley eventually moved his complex family to Haiti (see Mayorasgo de Coca) and sold his plantation to a relative, Kingsley Beatty Gibbs.

Kingsley's main house, kitchen, and barn have survived and been restored. His tabby slave quarters are one of the best preserved slave quarters in the country.

== Fort George Hotel ==
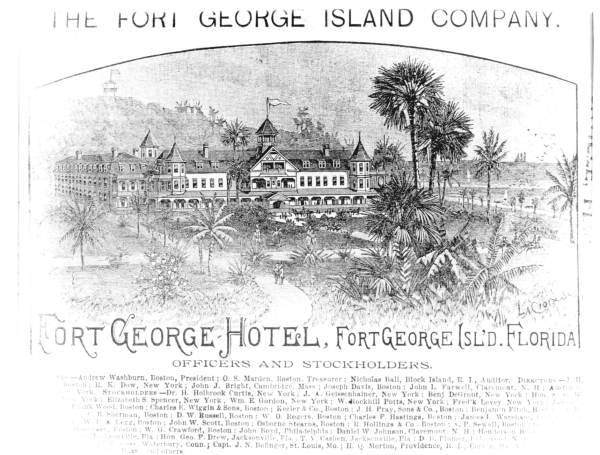
Fort George Hotel, Fort George Island, Florida, later 1870s

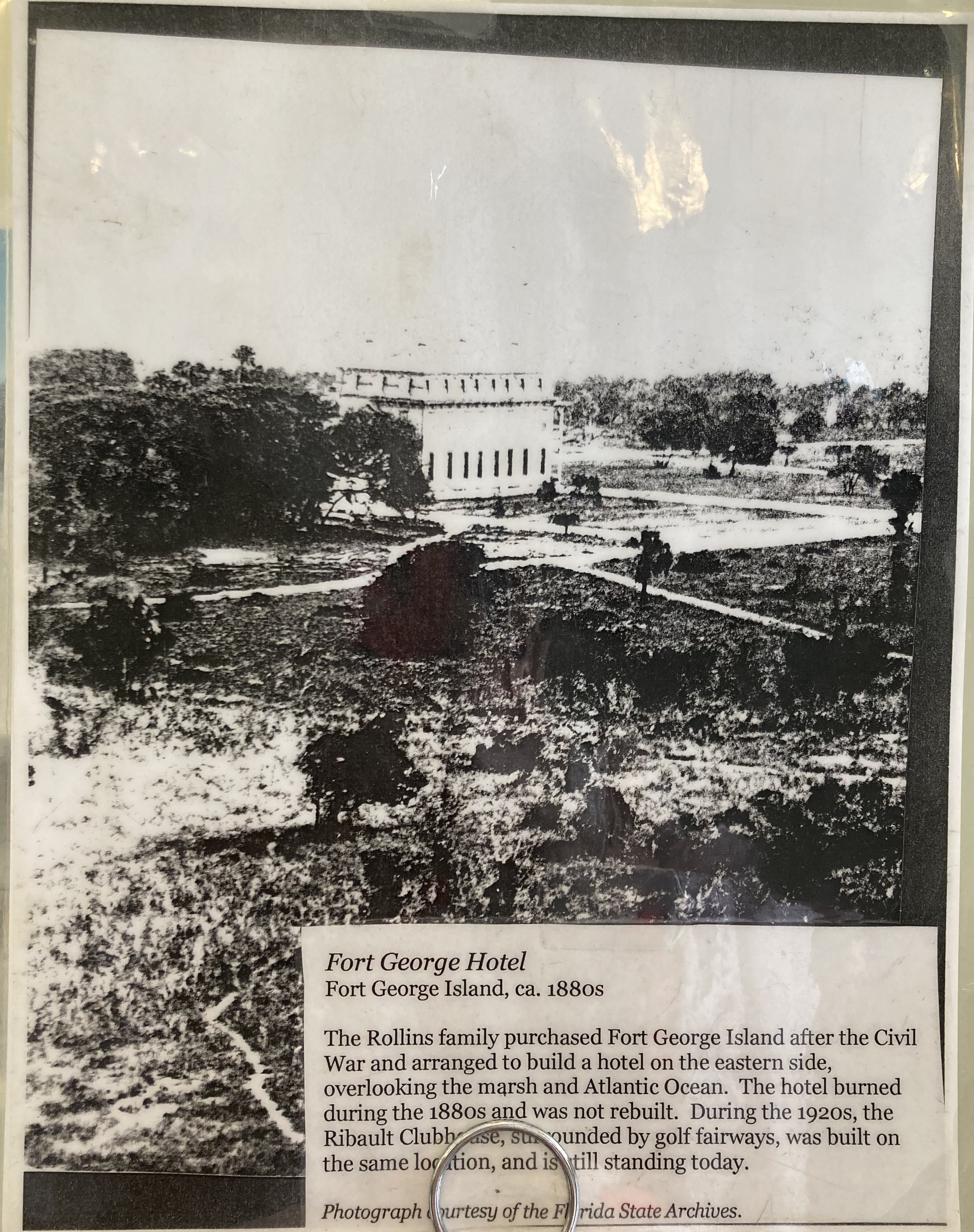
Fort George Hotel, Fort George Island, c. 1870-1880

Between the Civil War and 1898 the island was an international resort, with a large hotel and winter homes. It was also a citrus fruit center. The elegant Fort George Hotel, called "excellent" and "superbly situated" in 1878, was a key part of this campaign. It opened in 1875 and was destroyed by fire in 1889; it was not rebuilt as there was by then competition from the new railroad, delivering tourists to St. Augustine. The Ribault Club was later built on the same location.

After the fire that destroyed the hotel, a freeze in 1895 wiped out the oranges, and a yellow fever epidemic in 1897 drove away the remaining tourists.

== The Episcopal church ==
Another place registered on the National Register of Historic Places is St. George Episcopal Church, built in 1882–1883.

== The Ribault Club ==
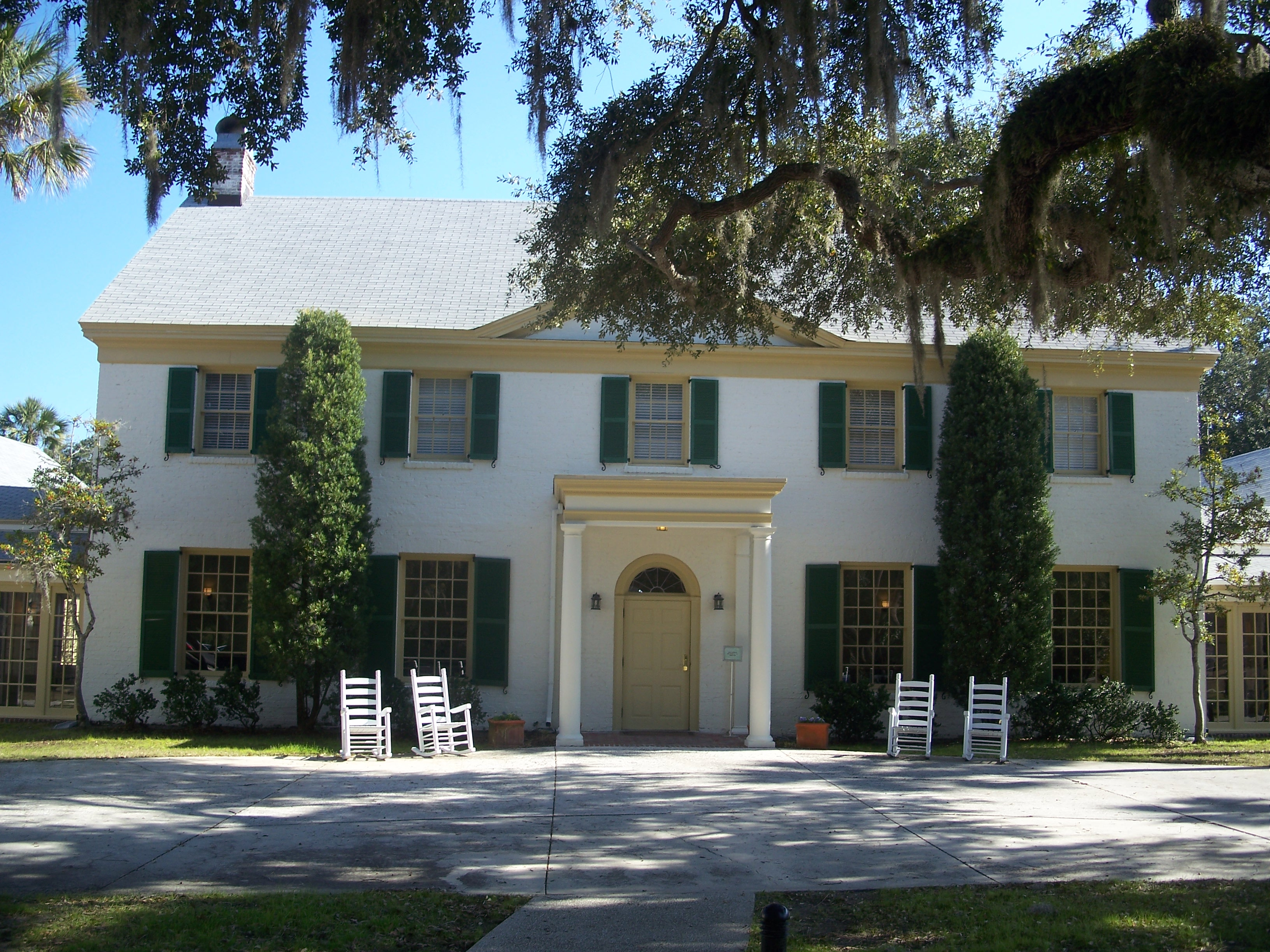
Ribault Inn Club, a winter resort now used as visitors' center

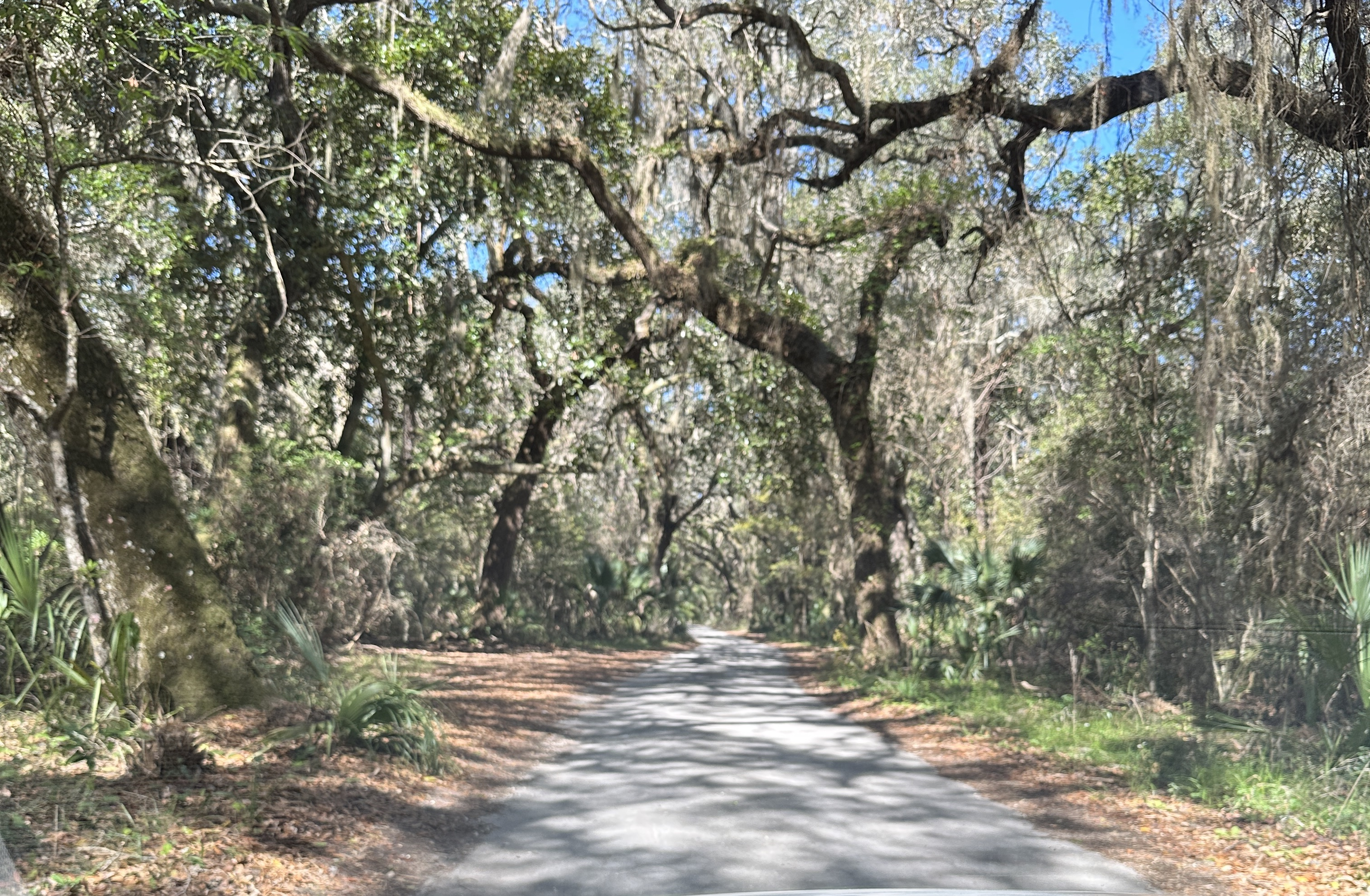
Fort George Road, near the Ribault Club. The trees overhanging the road are live oaks.

The Ribault Club on Fort George Island was built as a clubhouse for the affluent and opened its doors in 1928. It hosted grand parties and elegant affairs of all kinds during the late 20's and 1930's. In the 21st century it is a popular wedding venue.

The club was built on the site of the Fort George Hotel. The historical marker for the Spanish mission is on the Ribault Club grounds.

== Famous residents ==
- Anna Madgigine Jai Kingsley, wife of Zephaniah Kingsley
- Francisco Pareja, Franciscan friar, scholar of Timucua language
- Kingsley Beatty Gibbs, nephew of Zephaniah Kingsley; purchased island from him
- Zephaniah Kingsley, slave trader, planter

Exact location not known, but nearby:

- Jean Ribault, French conquistador, first European to see the St. John's River
- Saturiwa, Timucua ruler

== Video ==
- Lahav, Sean D., Exploring North Florida's Fort George Island Cultural State Park, WJCT Public Media

== See also ==
- Fort Caroline
