= Ribault Inn Club =

Historic building in Florida, US

- The Ribault Club
- U.S. National Register of Historic Places
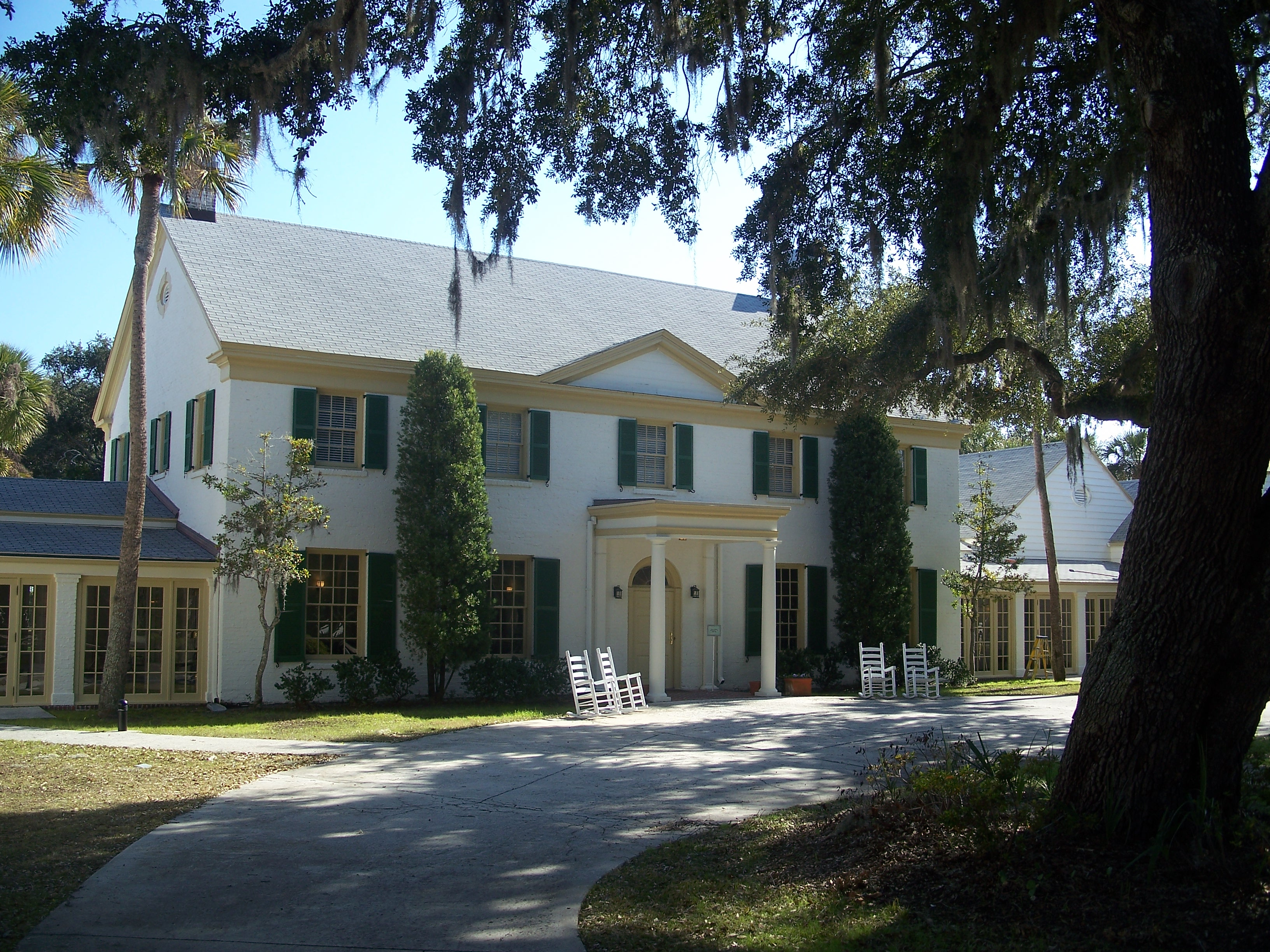

- Location within Florida Location within the United States
- Location: Jacksonville, Florida, USA
- Coordinates: 30°25′36″N 81°25′27″W
- Built: 1928
- Architectural style: Colonial Revival
- NRHP reference No.: 00000470
- Added to NRHP: May 11, 2000

The Ribault Club is a historic building on Fort George Island near Jacksonville, Florida. It is now home to the Fort George Island Visitor Center.

It is named after Jean Ribault, French explorer, first European to see the St. John's River and founder of French Florida.

== Overview ==
The building was designed in a Colonial Revival architecture style and is credited to Maurice Fatio and Mellen Clark Greeley. It was added to the U.S. National Register of Historic Places on May 11, 2000, and is located on Fort George Road. It was built in 1928 for winter recreation on the site of a former hotel and is considered a legacy of Fort George Island's resort era. Winter recreational opportunities included golf, tennis, hunting, fishing, and yachting. Today many weddings are held at the Club. The building is listed as a Historic Landmark by the City of Jacksonville. It became part of the Fort George Island Cultural State Park in 1989.
