= House at 1240 Cocoanut Road =

Historic house in Florida, United States

- 1240 Cocoanut Road
- U.S. National Register of Historic Places
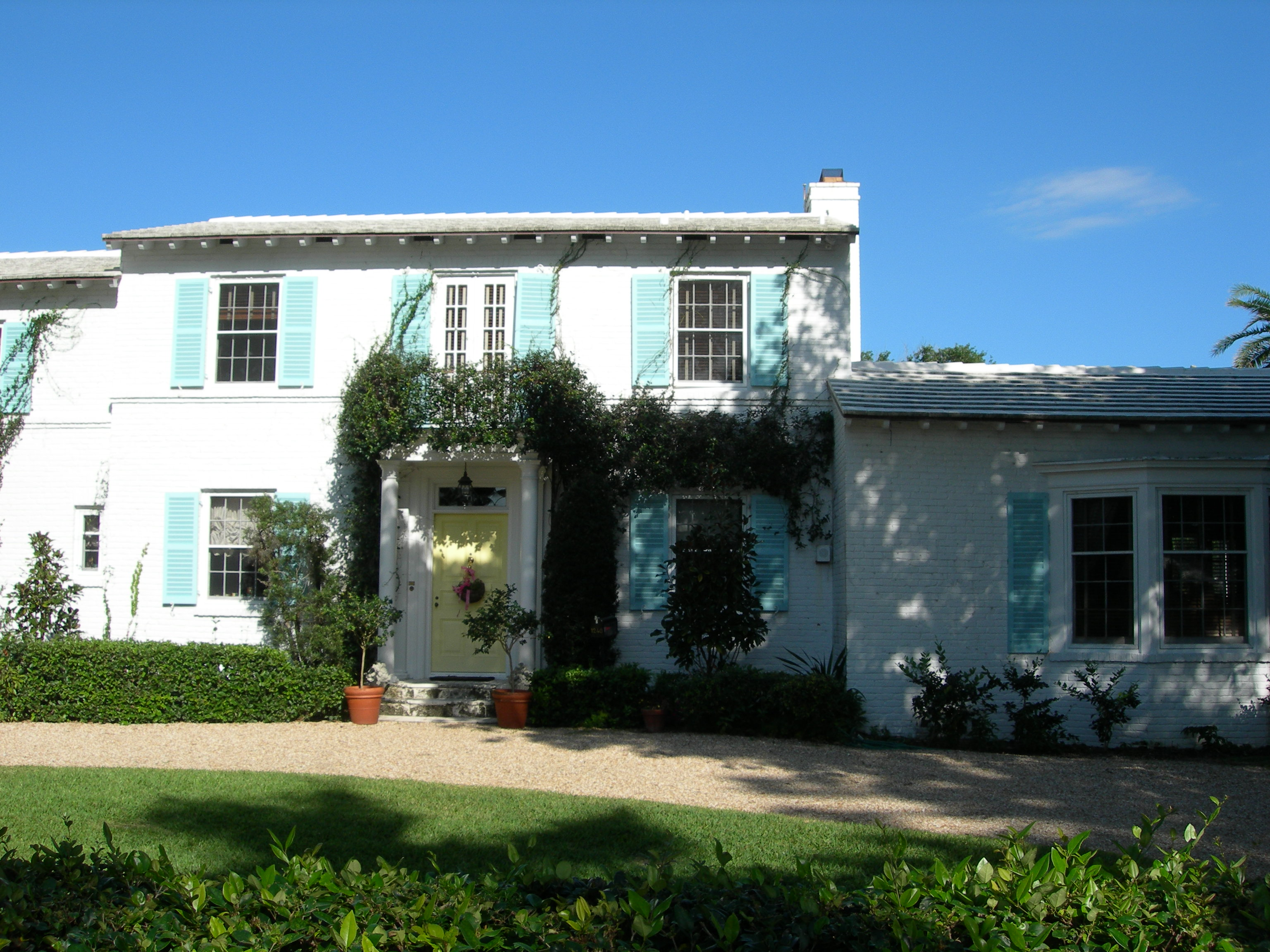

- Location within Florida Location within the United States
- Location: Boca Raton, Florida
- Coordinates: 26°19′59.43″N 80°04′35.78″W
- Area: less than one acre
- Built: 1937
- Architect: Maurice Fatio
- Architectural style: Colonial Revival
- NRHP reference No.: 01000888
- Added to NRHP: August 17, 2001

1240 Cocoanut Road (formerly known as the Dickenson House) is a historic house located at 1240 Cocoanut Road in Boca Raton, Florida. It is locally significant for its association with Maurice Fatio, a master architect with an office in Palm Beach.

== Description and history ==
The two-story Colonial Revival style house was designed by architect Maurice Fatio. The house was added to the National Register of Historic Places on August 17, 2001.
