= Woman's Club of Jacksonville =

- Formerly listed on the U.S. National Register of Historic Places
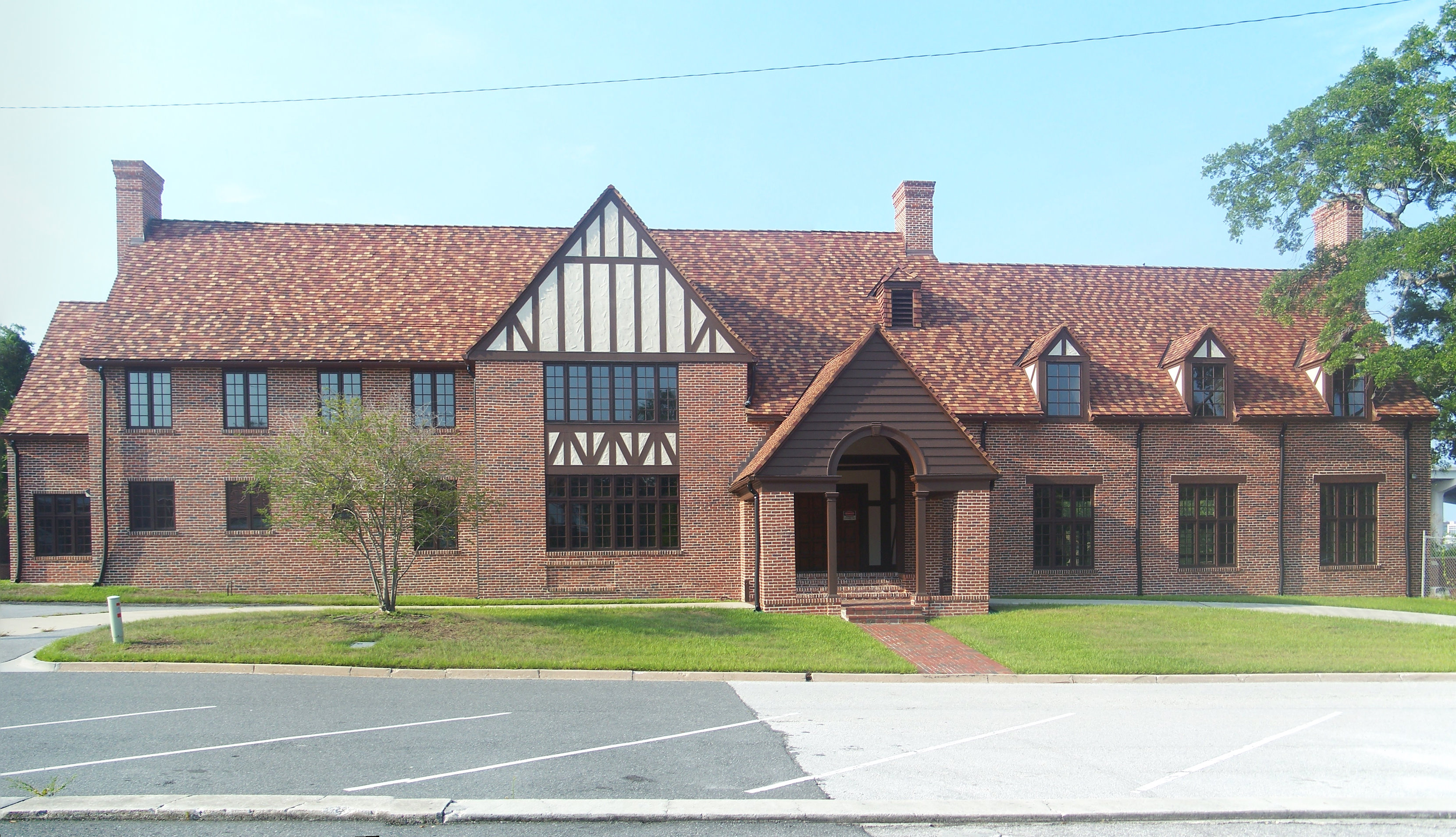
- Location: Jacksonville, Florida, USA
- Coordinates: 30.3144°N 81.67684°W
- Architect: Mellen Clark Greeley
- Architectural style: Tudor Revival
- NRHP reference No.: 92001505

Significant dates
- Added to NRHP: November 3, 1992
- Removed from NRHP: August 22, 2023

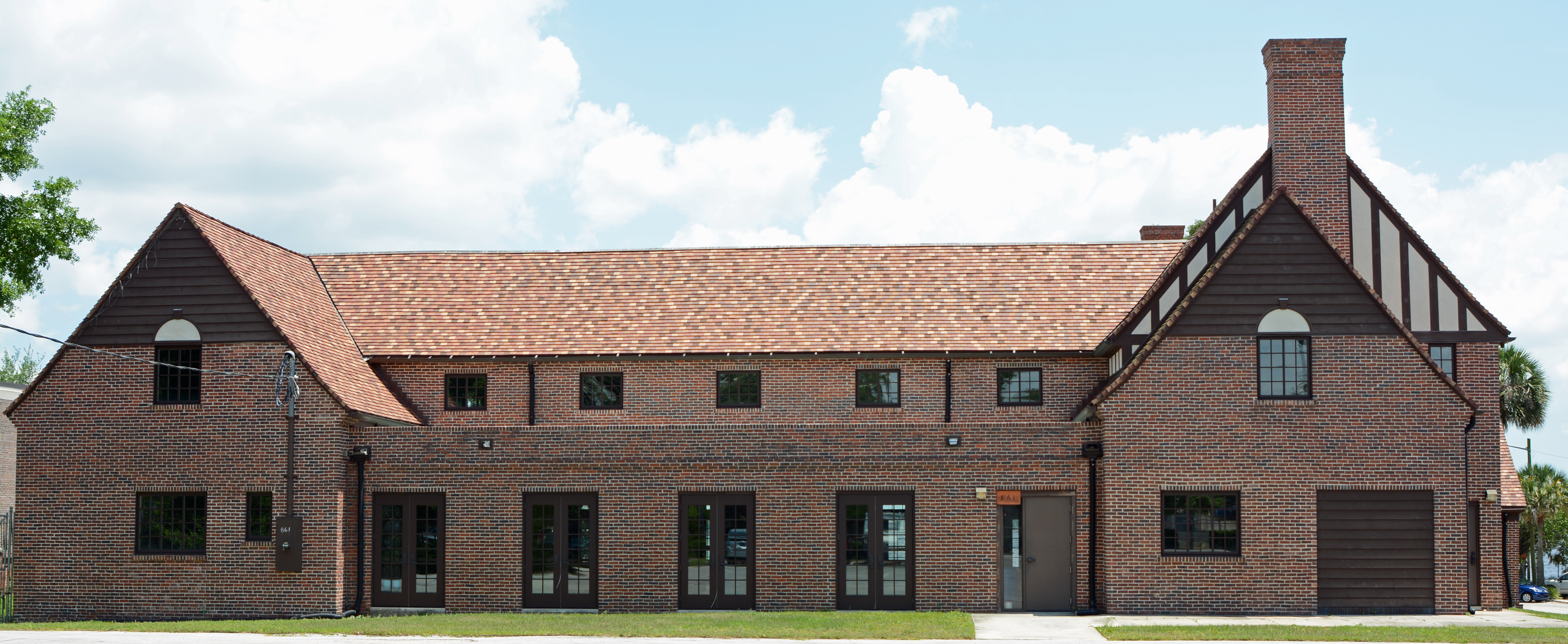
The side facing the street, 2016

The Woman's Club of Jacksonville was an historic woman's club in Jacksonville, Florida. It was located at 861 Riverside Avenue, next to the Cummer Museum of Art and Gardens. On November 3, 1992, it was added to the U.S. National Register of Historic Places.

Ninah Cummer donated the land and the Tudor-style building was constructed in 1927 to serve the Woman's Club of Jacksonville. The original 13,264 square-foot building was designed and built in the same style as Cummer's adjacent estate at her request. The structure was designed by architect Mellen Clark Greeley.

The Woman's Club of Jacksonville was instrumental in advocating for women's suffrage and other issues.

The building served as home to the Woman's Club of Jacksonville until November 2005. The Cummer Museum acquired the Woman's Club of Jacksonville in February 2005.

The Woman's Club donated their records to the Jacksonville Historical Society.

The building was purchased in 2008 and the exterior was renovated at a total cost of $7 million. Due to extreme termite damage discovered in 2016 the building was demolished.

== See also ==
List of Registered Historic Woman's Clubhouses in Florida
