= The Brazilian Court =

- Interactive map of the The Brazilian Court area

General information
- Location: 301 Australian Avenue; Palm Beach, Florida 33480-4627; United States
- Coordinates: 26.703343°N 80.038734°W
- Owner: Obadon Hotels

Website
- www.thebraziliancourt.com

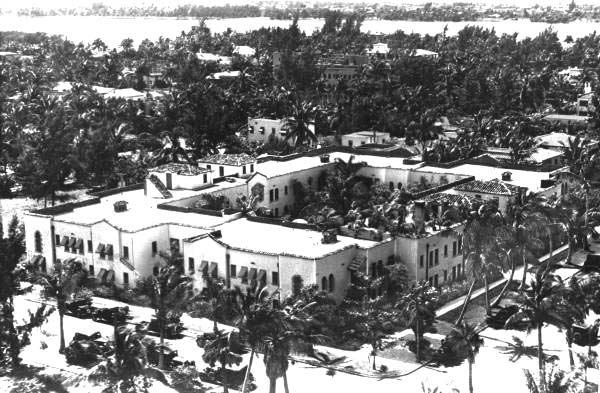
Brazilian Court Hotel, c. 1920

The Brazilian Court Hotel is a historic luxury hotel in Palm Beach, Florida, United States which opened on New Year's Day in 1926. The National Trust for Historic Preservation accepted The Brazilian Court Hotel to be part of the Historic Hotels of America.

In 1924 and 1925 two New York investors, Joseph D'Esterre and Stanley Paschal assembled the site of The Brazilian Court, at that time occupied by a few bungalows. They retained a rising young designer with whom Paschal had worked on apartment house projects in New York – Rosario Candela. Candela, born in Sicily, arrived in the United States in the 1910s speaking only a few words of English. But by 1925 he was one of the top apartment house designers in New York, with a score of luxury buildings on Park and Fifth Avenues to his credit.

Candela used a Mediterranean design for The Brazilian Court, with tinted, rough stucco, classical details and tiled roofs. Candela developed a simple courtyard model which emphasized the inner face of the building, rather than the street façade. It was organized as an apartment hotel, with small kitchens for the meals that guests chose not to take outside.

In 2003, Obadon Hotels purchased The Brazilian Court, and renovated it from the formal setting of the 1920s to a more cosmopolitan style. In doing so, the kitchenettes were removed, and in their place opened a restaurant, Cafe Boulud, under the James Beard Award nominee, Chef Daniel Boulud.

The hotel is located at 301 Australian Avenue. It is a National Trust for Historic Preservation and a Leading Hotel of the World. Awards include Fodor's 100 Hotel Awards 2013 - Enduring Classics, Travel + Leisure's 500 World's Best Hotels 2014, 2013, 2012, 2010, 2009, Conde Nast Traveler: Readers’ Choice Awards 2013: # 1 Hotel in the state of Florida, 2012, Conde Nast Traveler: Gold List 2014: #1 Hotel in the state of Florida, 2013, 2011, 2010, 2008, Travel + Leisure's America's Best Beach Hotels 2011 - #1 in South Florida, Travel + Leisure’s 500 World’s Best Hotels 2010 - Ranked #1 in South Florida and #3 in Florida state and Travel + Leisure's 2010 World's Best Awards Top 50 Resorts in US & Canada category – only hotel on Florida's East Coast ranked in the Top 25

David Kennedy died of a drug overdose in Room 107 of the hotel on April 25, 1984.
