= Kingsley Beatty Gibbs =

American politician

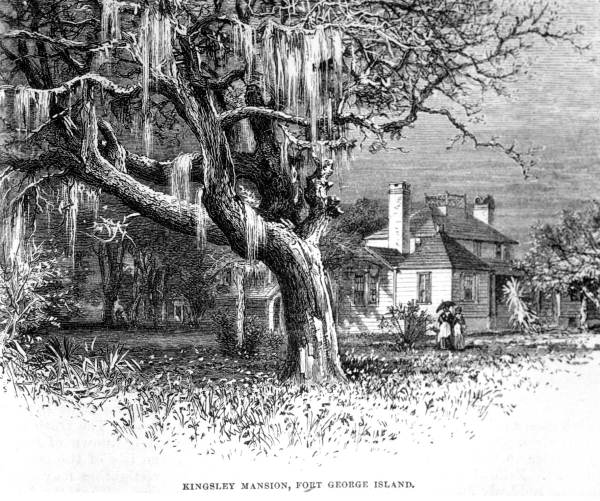
Kingsley Plantation in 1878, a romanticized sketch

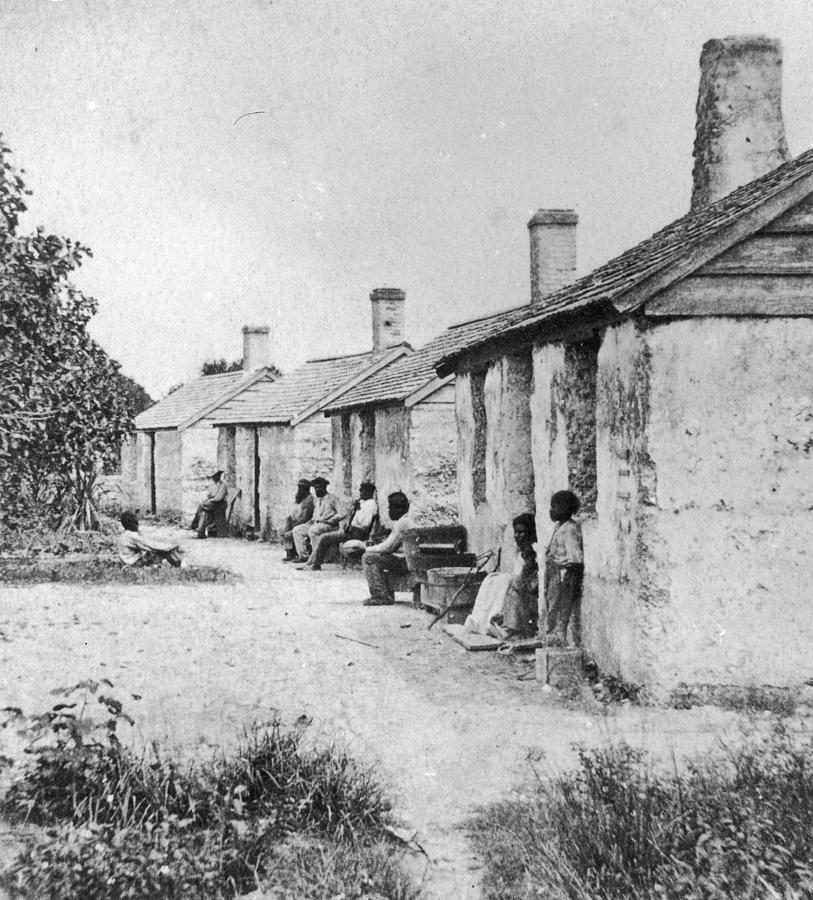
Slave quarters at the Kingsley Plantation as it was under Gibbs

Kingsley Beatty Gibbs (Brooklyn Heights, New York, July 25, 1810 — October 18, 1859) was a writer and mill operator, the deputy clerk of Duval Country, Florida and an alderman of St Augustine, Florida. He was also the nephew of slave trader Zephaniah Kingsley and the executor of the latter's will.

== Biography ==
Gibbs' first position was Deputy Clerk of the Duval County, Florida, Superior Court. He was elected an alderman of St. Augustine in 1835. In 1836 and 1837, he also served as a member of the Florida militia.

In 1839, when Zephaniah Kingsley sold his Fort George Plantation and moved to Haiti, Gibbs purchased the plantation. He farmed the land using slave labor. During this time, Gibbs was elected to the Territorial Legislature, where he opposed Florida statehood.

When Kingsley died in 1843, Gibbs, became an executor of the former's will. He also inherited 1,000 acres (400 ha) in St. Johns County, the books from Kingsley's library, Kingsley's weapons, the schooner "North Carolina", and one twelfth of Kingsley's estate, including slaves. Gibbs was also named guardian of Kingsley's minor children.

It was around this time that Gibbs built a mill called Mayport Mill near the mouth of the St. Johns River, giving the location its name, Mayport, which it still bears today. In 1846, his name appeared in the paper for helping shipwreck victims. In 1851, giving his address as Mayport Mills, Duval County, he advertised the products of the United States Mutual Insurance Company.

In 1852, he sold the plantation and moved to St. Augustine, where he was again an alderman on the city council from 1854 to 1856.

Shortly before his death he wrote memoirs covering in some detail life at the plantation, which indirectly illuminate Kingsley's era. By good fortune this, then-unidentified, manuscript reached the park manager at the Kingsley Plantation State Historic Site, and was posthumously published and annotated.

== Personal life ==
In 1833, Gibbs married Ana Eduarda Teresa Hernández, but she died after three years, with no children. He later married Laura Williams, and they had two children.
