= Fort George Island Cultural State Park =

State park in Florida, US

- IUCN category IV (habitat/species management area)
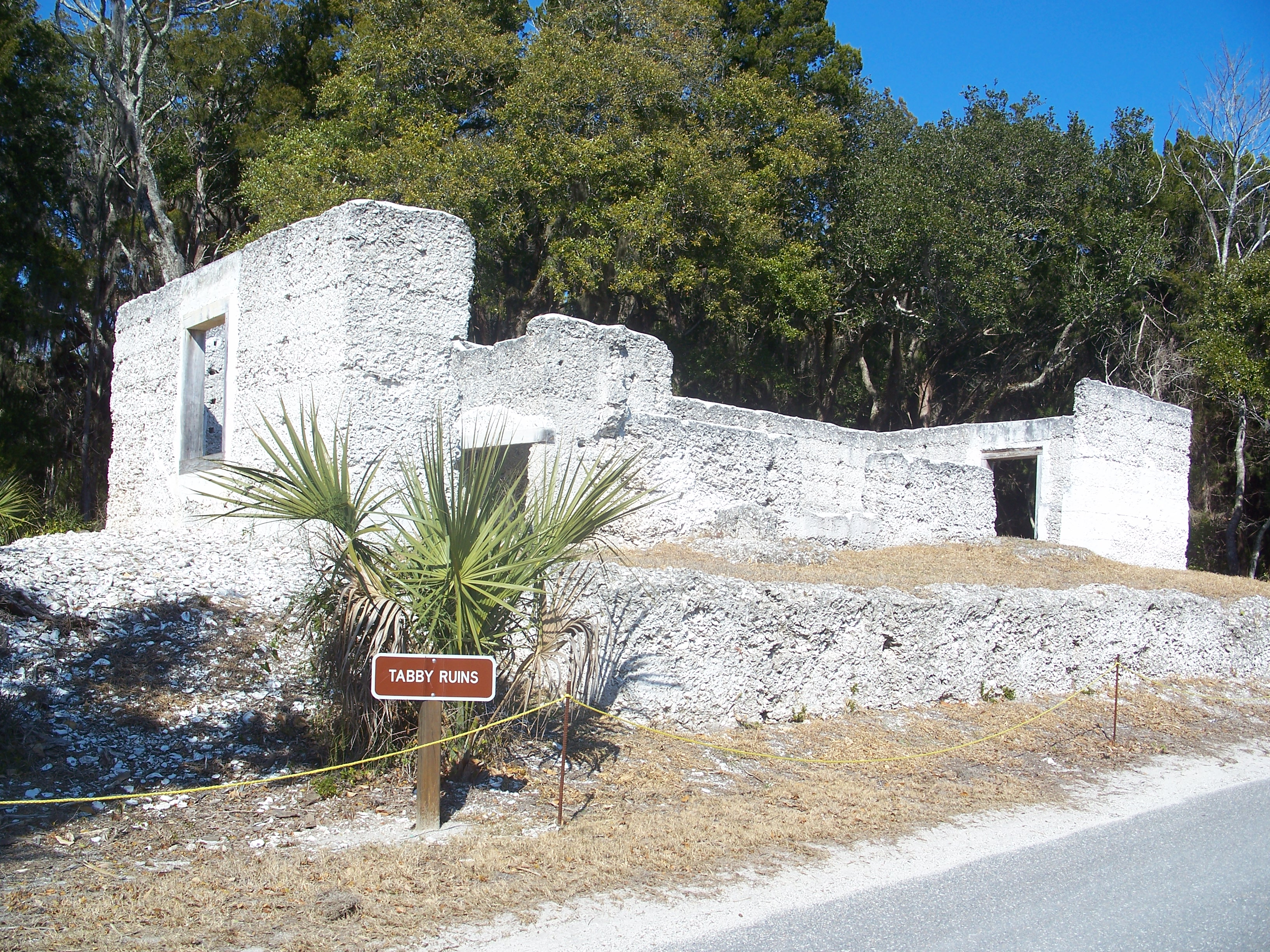
- Tabby ruins

- Location within Florida Location within the United States
- Interactive map of Fort George Island Cultural State Park
- Location: Duval County, Florida, USA
- Nearest city: Jacksonville, Florida
- Coordinates: 30°25′41″N 81°25′31.6″W
- Established: 1989
- Governing body: Florida Department of Environmental Protection

Fort George Island Cultural State Park is a Florida state park located on Fort George Island in far northeast Duval County/Jacksonville, Florida. The site was previously very near a major Timucua (Native American) center, where Spaniards founded the mission of San Juan del Puerto, It is home to the Ribault Inn Club, constructed in 1928 as a winter resort and now used as a visitors' center for the nearby Kingsley Plantation and the island as a whole.

== Activities ==
Besides visiting the nearby Kingsley Plantation, other activities include off-road bicycling, hiking, boating, canoeing, kayaking, and fishing. Amenities include a 4.4-mile (7.1 km)-long loop bicycle trail, boat ramp, a 3-mile (4.8 km) hiking/biking trail, and a beach. The park is open from 8:00 am until sundown year-round. There is no admission charge.
