= Maurice Fatio =

Swiss-American architect (1897–1943)

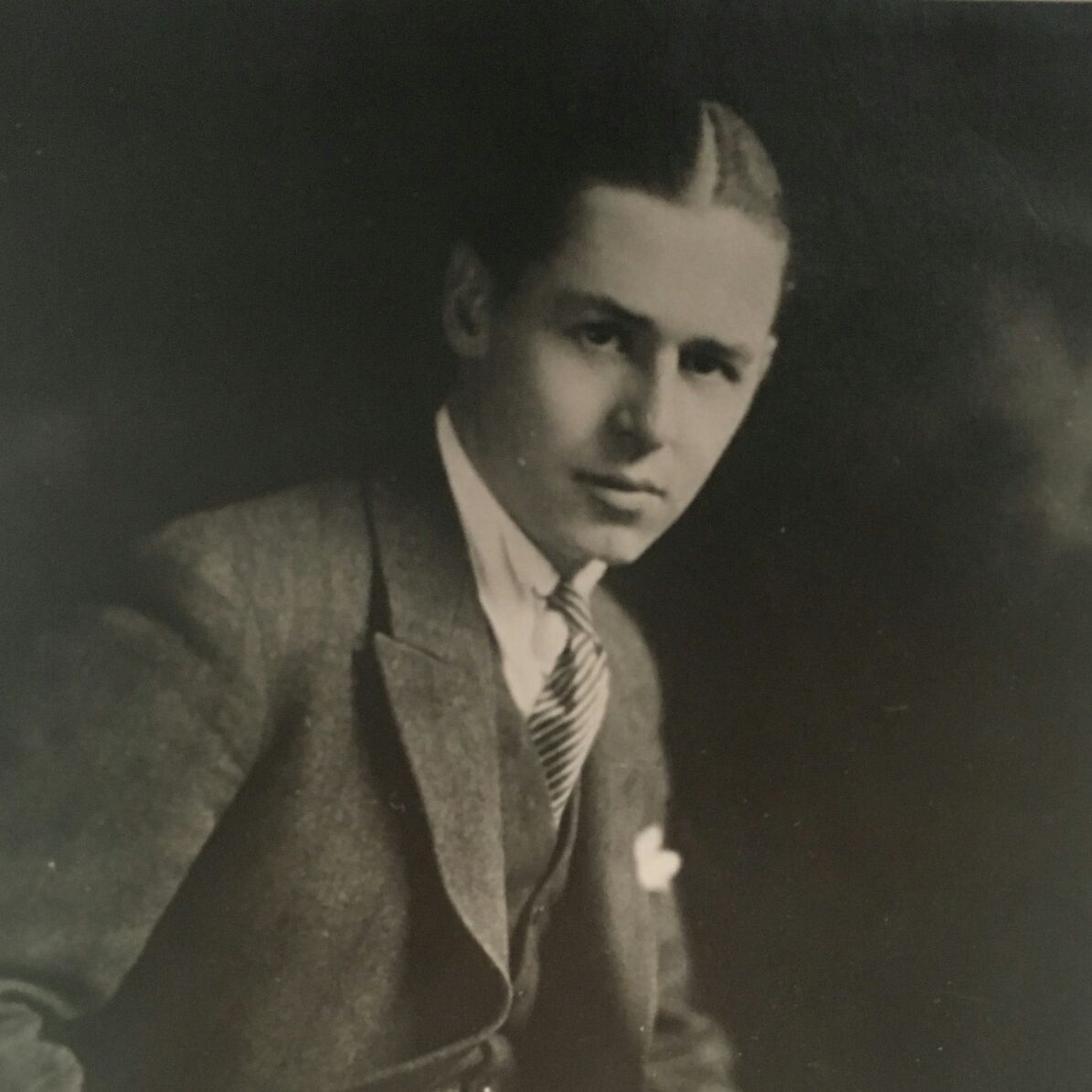
- Fatio in 1927
- Born: 18 March 1897; Geneva, Switzerland
- Died: December 2, 1943 (aged 46); Chicago, Illinois, United States
- Education: University of Zurich
- Occupation: Architect
- Spouse: Eleanor Chase (m. 1929)
- Children: Alexandra and Maurice
- Buildings: Ribault Inn Club; Eastover; House at 1240 Cocoanut Road

Maurice Fatio (18 March 1897 – 2 December 1943) was a Swiss-born American architect.

== Biography ==
Maurice Fatio was born in Geneva, Switzerland, on 18 March 1897, originating from a prominent family.

He graduated from the Polytechnical School at the University of Zurich and studied under Swiss architect Karl Moser.

In 1920, he came to New York City, where he first worked for society architect Harrie Lindeberg. He soon branched out on his own in partnership with William A. Treanor who was twenty years his senior. In May 1923, the 26-year-old Fatio was voted the most popular architect in New York.

He moved to Palm Beach, Florida, in 1925 and opened an office there. In Palm Beach, he began designing harmonious Mediterranean-style houses and eventually branched out into everything from Georgian to contemporary. In 1929, he married Eleanor Chase (1901-1944), a prominent Palm Beach society girl and novelist, in New York City.

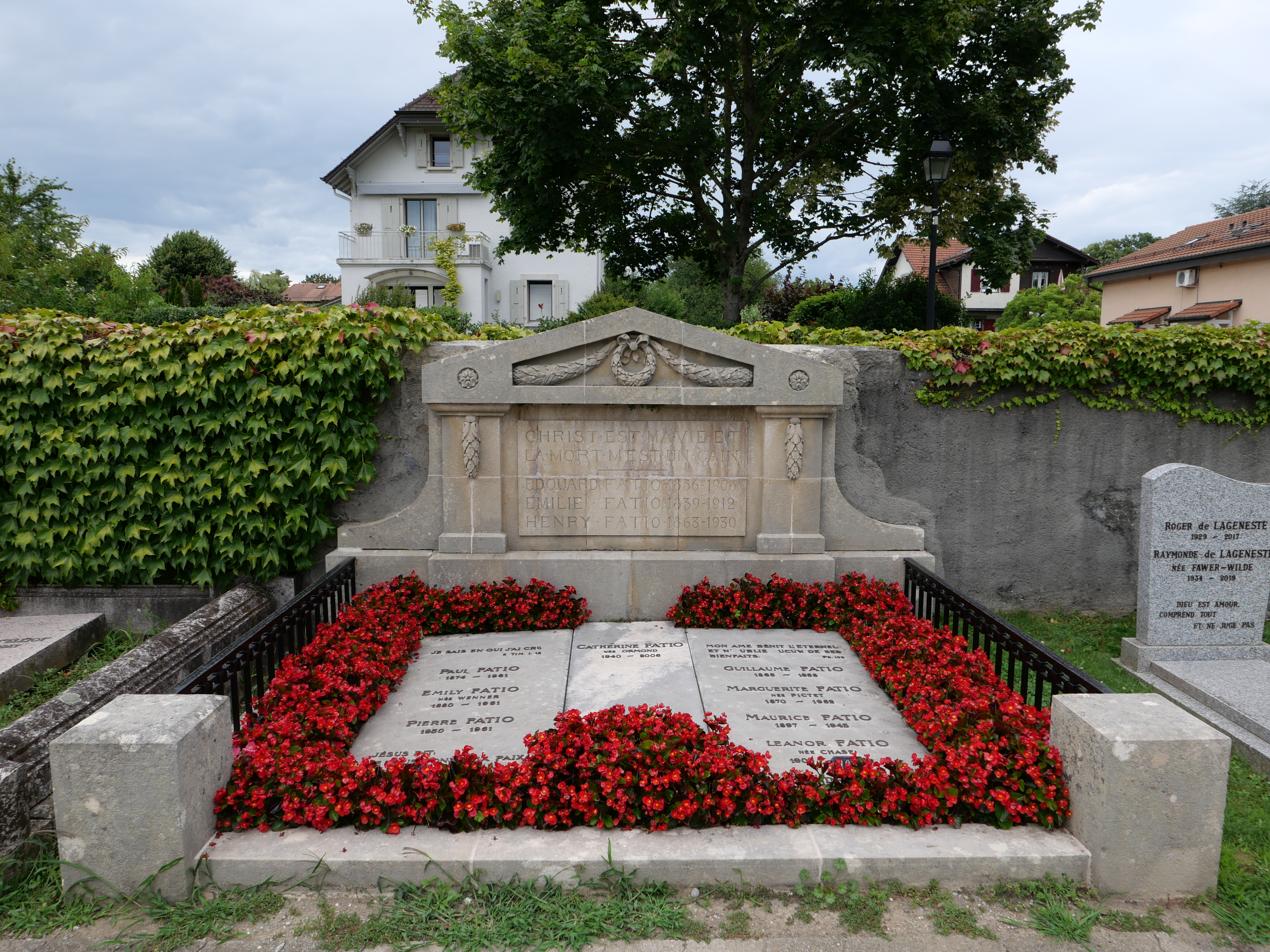
The family grave in 2024.

Fatio had two children with Chase, Alexandra (1932-2015) and Maurice Pierre "Petey"(1930-1961). Maurice Fatio died on December 2, 1943, of lung cancer at a Chicago hospital. His wife died the next year. Both were buried in the Fatio-family grave at the cemetery of Genthod.

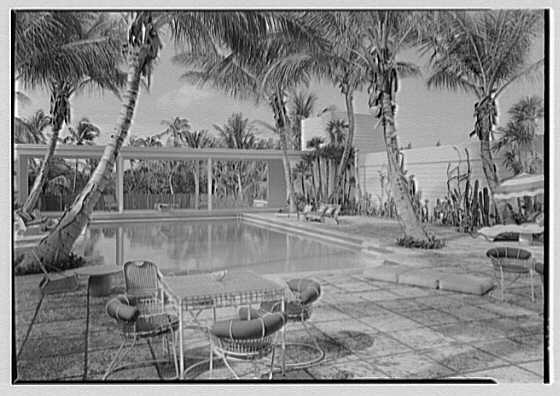
The Reef in Palm Beach, pictured 1937.

James Clark bought the 40,000 square foot Il Palmetto in 1999. In December 2010 Casa Alva sold for $27.5 M.

== Notable buildings ==
- Residence of David Rockefeller. 146 East 65th Street, New York City. 1924.
- Buenos Recuerdos . Palm Beach. 1927. Henry G. Barkhausen.
- Ribault Inn Club, 1928 Fort George Island
- First National Bank of Palm Beach. 1928.
- Casa Della Porta. 195 Via Del Mar, Palm Beach. 1928. Mr. & Mrs. William J. McAneeny.
- Clubhouse - Indian Creek Country Club. Miami Beach. 1929.
- Casa Eleda. South Ocean Blvd., Palm Beach. 1929. Mortimer L. Schiff.
- Il Palmetto. 1520 South Ocean Blvd., Palm Beach. 1930. Joseph E. Widener.
- Eastover. 1100 South Ocean Boulevard, Manalapan, Florida. 1930. Mr. & Mrs. Harold S. Vanderbilt. On the U.S. National Register of Historic Places.
- Villa Today. Palm Beach. 1932. Mrs. Audrey Berdeau.
- Casa Alva. Manalapan, FL. 1935. Colonel & Mrs. Jacques Balsan.
- The Reef. 1935. 702 N. County Road, Palm Beach. Josephine Hartford Makaroff & Vadim Makaroff
- Brazilian Court Hotel. Palm Beach. 1936. South wing added by Fatio.
- Society of the Four Arts, Library. Palm Beach. 1936.
- Crespi Estate. Dallas, Texas. 1939. Pio & Florence Crespi.
- Four Winds. Palm Beach. Mr. & Mrs. Edward F. Hutton.
- Manana Point. Palm Beach. Mr. & Mrs Grover Loening.
- Villa Oheka. Palm Beach. Mr. & Mrs. Otto H. Kahn.
- Alva Base. Fisher Island, Miami Beach. Mr. & Mrs. William K. Vanderbilt, Jr.
- Dickinson House. 1240 Cocoanut Road, Boca Raton. On the U.S. National Register of Historic Places.
