= Eastover (Manalapan, Florida) =

- U.S. National Register of Historic Places
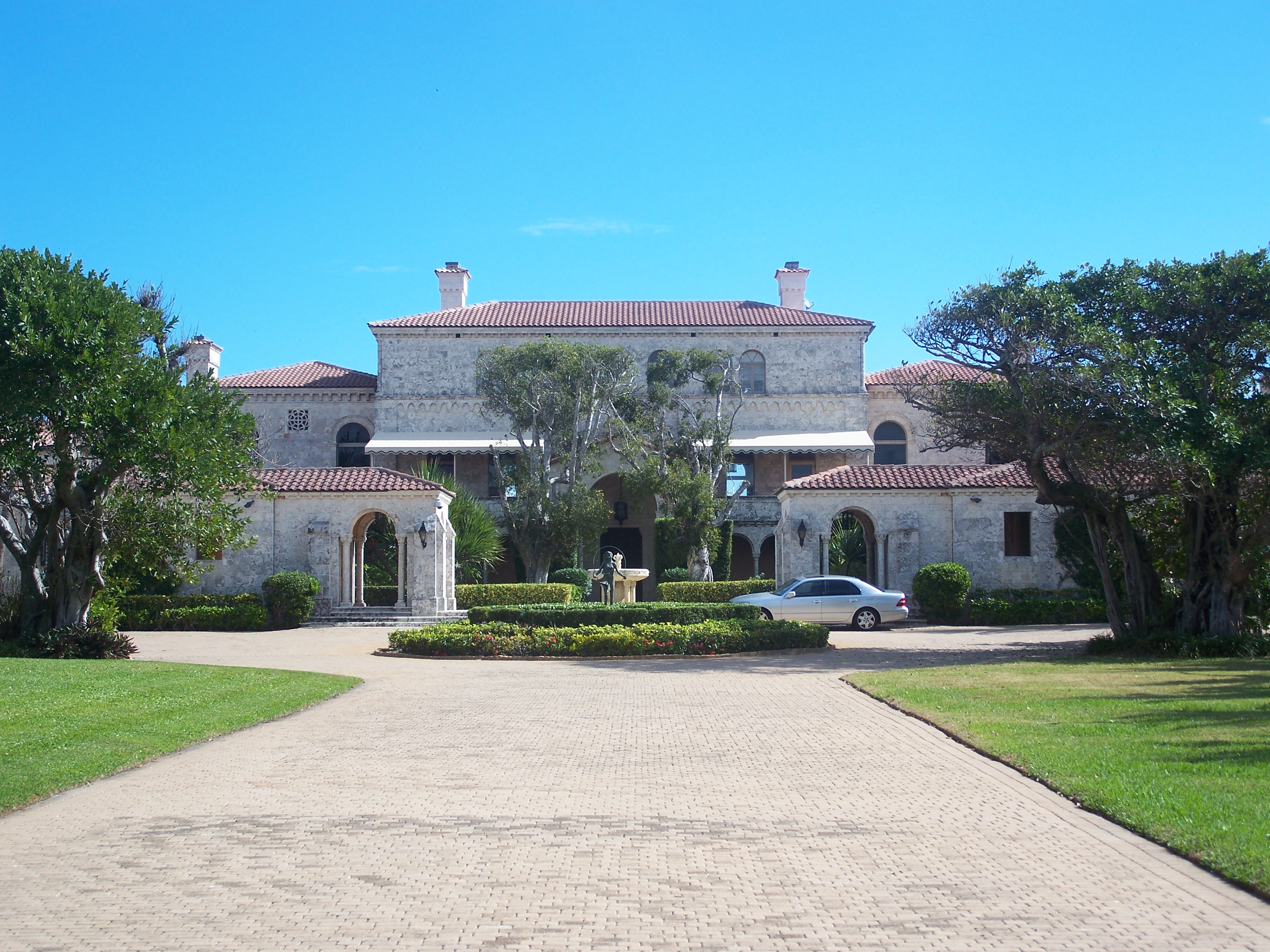

- Location within Florida Location within the United States
- Location: Manalapan, Florida United States
- Coordinates: 26°34′13″N 80°2′25″W
- Built: 1929
- Architect: Maurice Fatio
- NRHP reference No.: 02001694
- Added to NRHP: December 23, 2002

Eastover is a historic site in Manalapan, Florida. It is located at 1100 South Ocean Boulevard. On December 23, 2002, it was added to the U.S. National Register of Historic Places.

== History ==
The property was built for Harold Stirling Vanderbilt and his wife, Gertrude Conaway Vanderbilt, in 1930. It was designed by Swiss architect Maurice Fatio.

It is currently a private, single-family residence. A portion of the home has been demolished and the land has been subdivided. The home had approximately 500 feet (150 m) of ocean and intracoastal frontage, but now it has been reduced to 350 feet (110 m). The estate has more than 3.75 acres (15,200 m^{2}) of direct oceanfront land (according to tax records). The estate also includes a detached guest house, built in the mid-1990s.

In 2000, Randolph Apperson Hearst, a son of William Randolph Hearst, bought Eastover from film producer and shopping mall magnate Melvin Simon.
