= Quaker City, Pennsylvania =

Unincorporated community in Pennsylvania, US

- Unincorporated community
- Location within Pennsylvania
- Coordinates: 40°39′34″N 75°52′44″W
- Country: United States
- State: Pennsylvania
- County: Berks
- Township: Albany
- Elevation: 459 ft (140 m)
- Time zone: UTC-5 (Eastern (EST))
  - Summer (DST): UTC-4 (EDT)
- Area codes: 610 and 484
- GNIS feature ID: 1184518

Quaker City is an unincorporated community in Albany Township in Berks County, Pennsylvania, United States. Quaker City is located along Quaker City Road at the base of Blue Mountain.
