= Cummer Museum of Art and Gardens =

Art museum and gardens in Jacksonville, Florida, United States

Cummer Museum of Art & Gardens
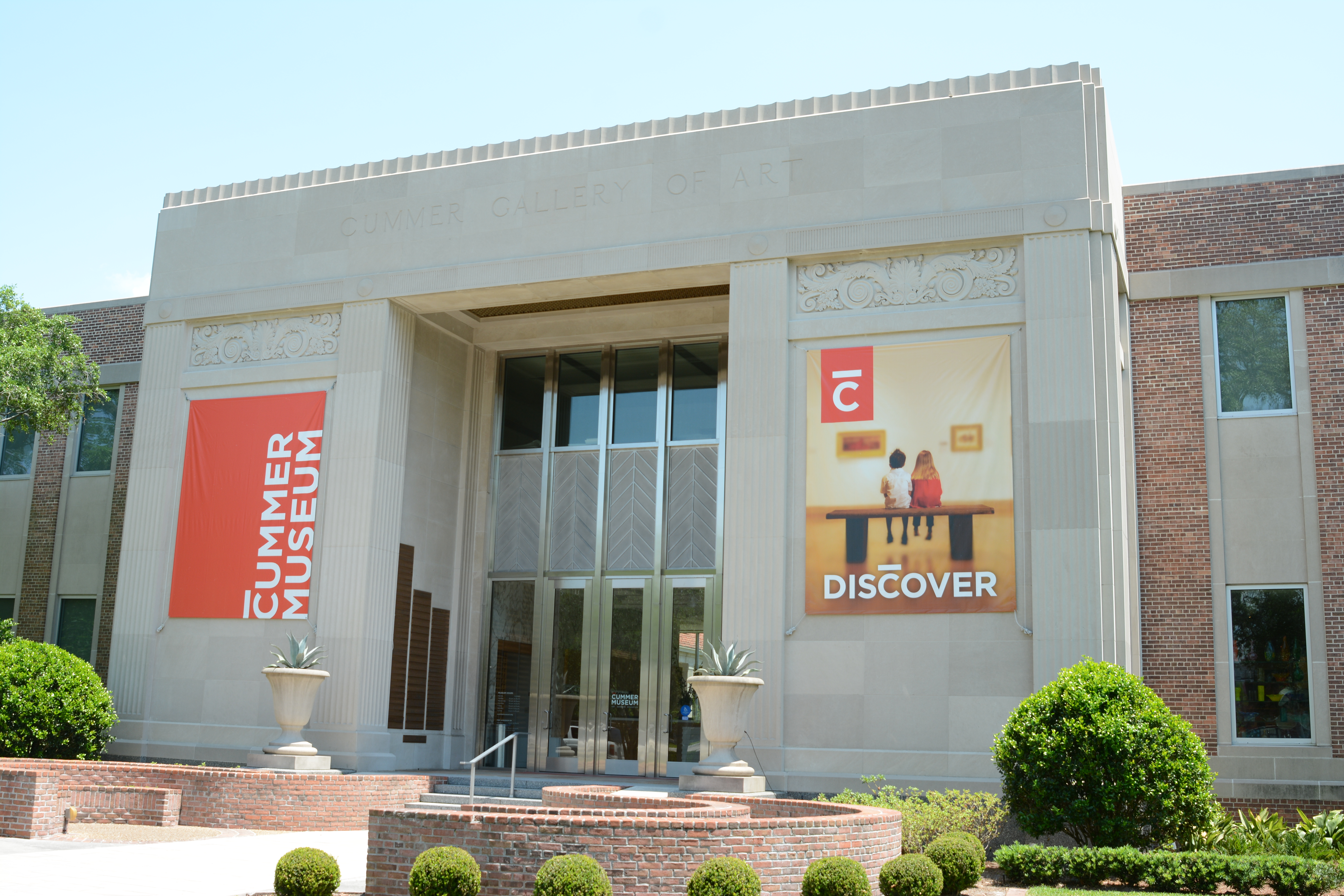
- Entrance to the Cummer Museum

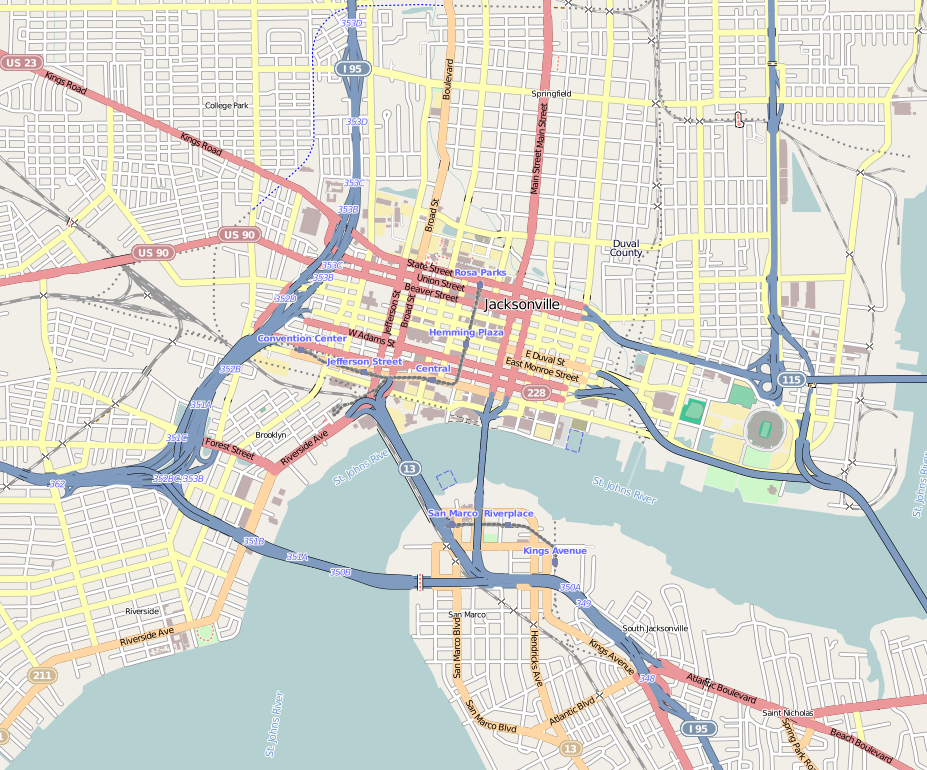
- Location within Central Jacksonville Location within Florida Location within the United States
- Former name: The Cummer Gallery
- Established: November 11, 1961
- Location: Jacksonville, Florida
- Coordinates: 30.314945°N 81.676900°W
- Type: Art museum
- Accreditation: American Alliance of Museums
- Collection size: 6000
- Visitors: 130,000 annually
- Founder: Ninah Cummer
- Director: Kimberly S Noble
- Curator: Holly Keris
- Public transit access: Bus: R5, WS12
- Parking: Across the street (no charge)
- Website: www.cummermuseum.org
- Cummer Gardens
- U.S. National Register of Historic Places
- NRHP reference No.: 09000345
- Added to NRHP: January 25, 2010

The Cummer Museum of Art and Gardens is a museum located in Jacksonville, Florida. It was founded in 1961 after the death of Ninah Cummer, who bequeathed her gardens and personal art collection to the new museum. The Cummer Museum has since expanded to include the property owned by Ninah's brother-in-law, but it still includes her original garden designs and a portion of her home with its historic furnishing. The museum and gardens attract 130,000 visitors annually.

The permanent collection of the museum includes over 5,000 works of art dating from 2100 BCE to the twenty-first century. The museum's collection is especially strong in European and American paintings and also includes substantial holdings of Meissen porcelain. The museum also has an award-winning education center, Art Connections, which possesses a number of interactive educational installations and serves underprivileged and special education students with its programs.

There are three flower gardens on the museum grounds, the oldest dating back to 1903. These gardens have preserved their original layout for over a century and were designed by landscape designers such as the Olmsted Brothers, Thomas Meehan & Sons, and Ellen Biddle Shipman. The Cummer Gardens are on the National Register of Historic Places.

== History ==
=== Cummer family ===
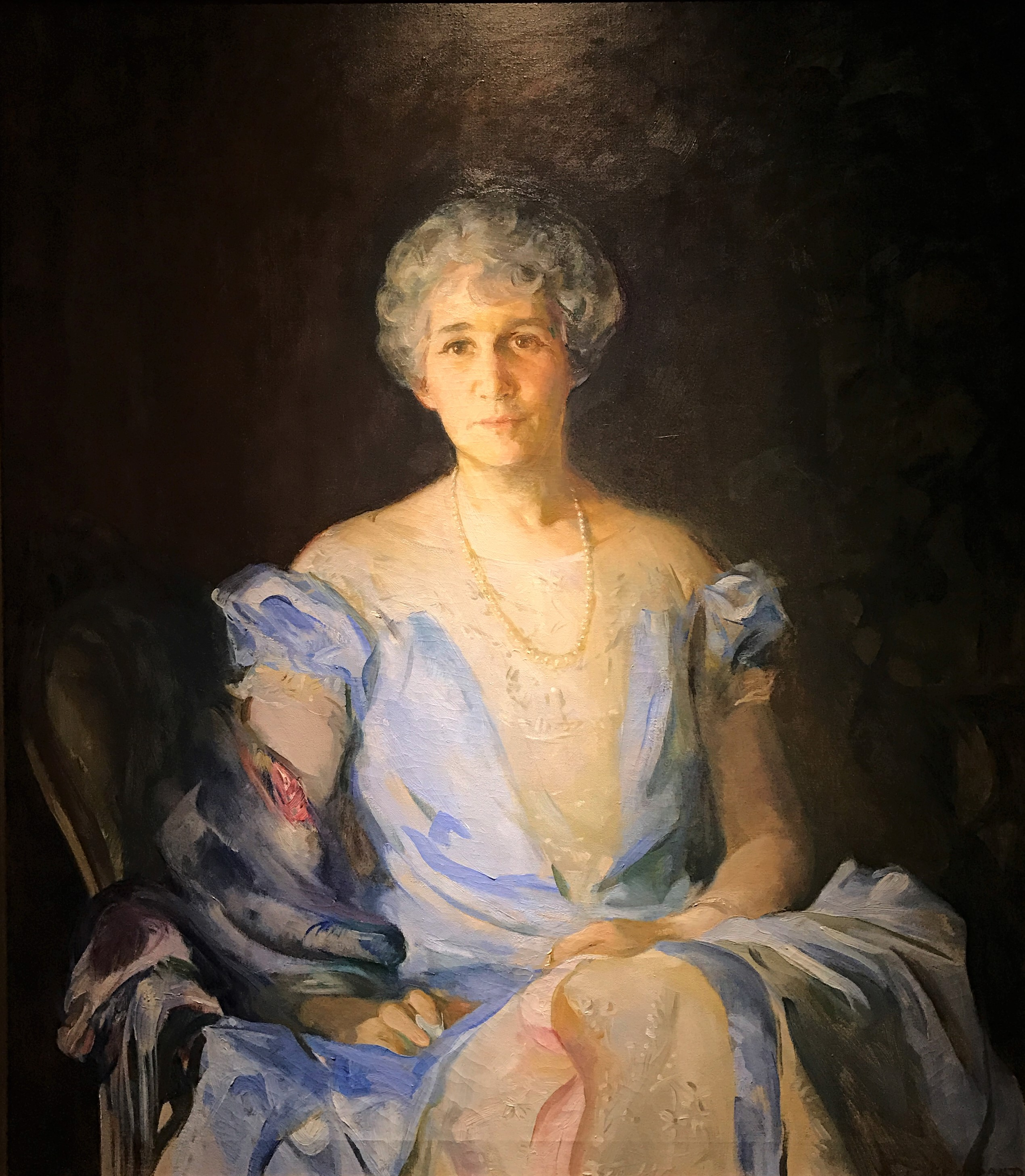
Ninah Cummer

The history of the Cummer Museum dates back to 1902. That year, Arthur and Ninah Cummer built their home on Riverside Avenue. Arthur's parents Wellington and Ada Cummer lived next door, and Arthur's brother Waldo and sister-in-law Clara lived nearby. Wellington Cummer was a wealthy lumber baron from Cadillac, Michigan who moved to Jacksonville in 1896. The Cummer Lumber company was, at one point, the largest landowner in Florida. Wellington also built the Jacksonville and Southwestern Railroad.

In 1906, on their honeymoon, Ninah and Arthur Cummer purchased their first piece of art, a painting titled Along the Strand directly from the artist, Paul King. The painting depicts two men riding horse-drawn carts on a beach. In 1931, Ada Cummer died, and her two sons tore down her old home and split the property. Ninah Cummer then hired landscape architect Ellen Biddle Shipman to create the Italian Garden on her and Arthur's land. Clara Cummer had her portion combined with her existing garden to create the Olmsted Garden.

After Arthur's death in January 1943, Ninah Cummer began collecting art in earnest. During the fifteen years before her death, Ninah expanded her art collection to sixty pieces, all of which are still in the museum's collection today. In 1957, the year before her death, Ninah announced that her gifts would “make only a small beginning toward a large vision” and hoped “that others will share this vision and by their interest and contributions will help establish here a center of beauty and culture worthy of the community.” She created the DeEtte Holden Cummer Museum Foundation, named for the deceased infant daughter of the Cummers, to manage her vision after her death.

=== Museum ===
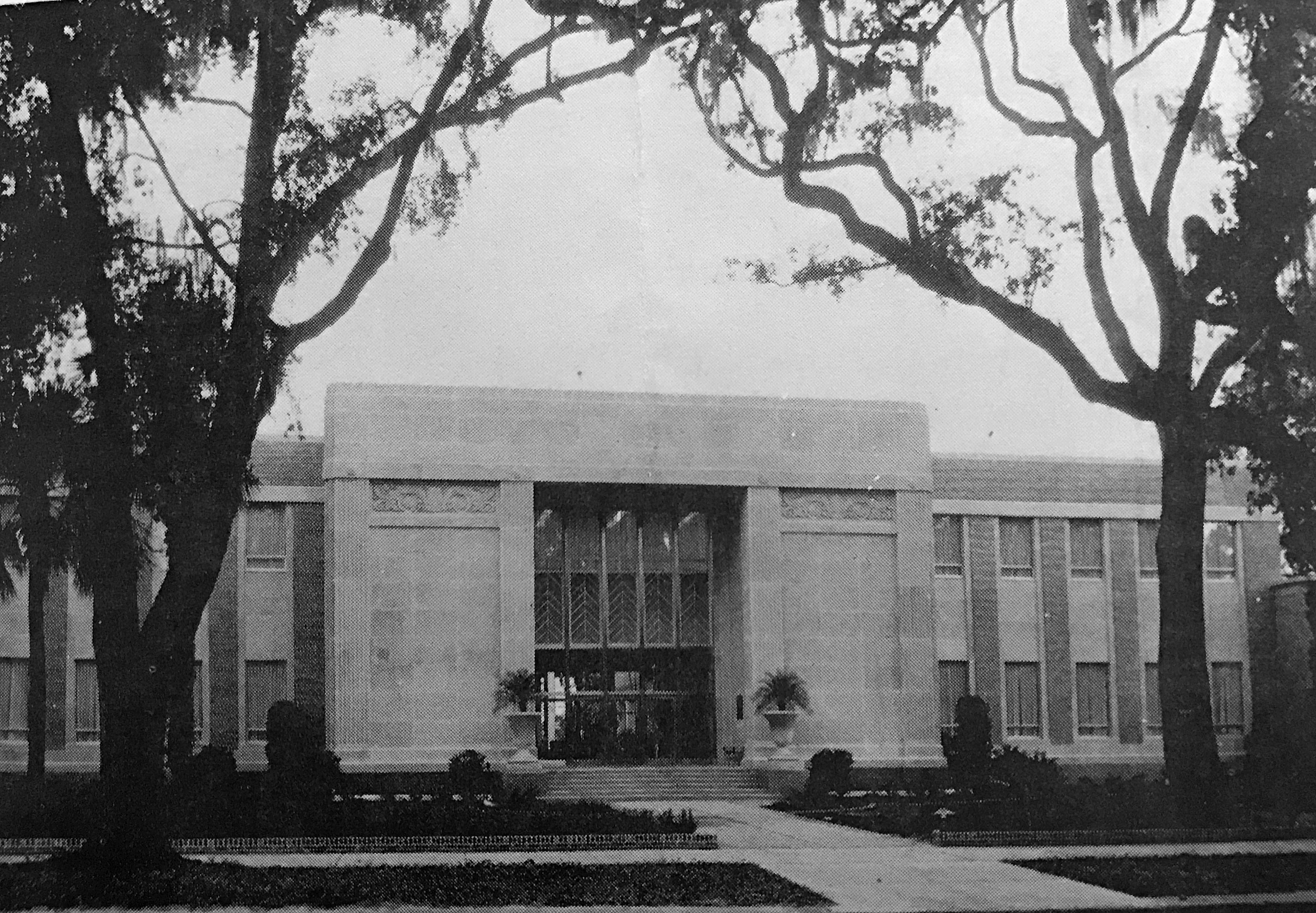
The new Cummer Gallery building, from a 1965 brochure.

Ninah Cummer and Clara Cummer, both now widows, died in 1958. Ninah Cummer left her estate, including her gardens, to the DeEtte Holden Cummer Museum Foundation for a museum to house her art collection. In 1960, the siblings' homes were both demolished in order to build the museum. Clara and Waldo's property was sold and now houses the Northeast Florida chapter of the American Red Cross and the Cummer's education center, Art Connections. Parts of the gardens were also destroyed during this demolition. The new building was designed by Saxelbye and Powell and constructed in 1961. It featured an Art Deco façade and an inner courtyard that was paved with the terra cotta tiles of the Cummers' old roof. One room from the original Cummer home, known as the Tudor Room, was preserved and incorporated into the new museum. The Cummer Museum of Art & Gardens, then named The Cummer Gallery, opened on November 11, 1961.

The museum's first opening was attended by one thousand guests, including Jacksonville mayor W. Haydon Burns and Florida governor Farris Bryant. Burns was noted as saying, "The people of Jacksonville have never received a gift comparable in generosity or beauty to the museum… a testament to the heritage of the past and representing the strength and character of those who were leaders of Jacksonville in the past." The museum's collection was on display, as well as three special exhibitions: a collection of 51 etchings by James McBey (now part of the museum's permanent collection), a selection of French paintings on loan from a New York gallery, and an exhibition of American art on loan from the National Academy of Design.

In 1971, ten years after the museum's opening, the Cummer celebrated the addition of a new wing for 17th-century art.

In 1989, the museum acquired an ancient Egyptian stela, dating back to 2100 BCE, making it the oldest piece of art in the museum's collection.

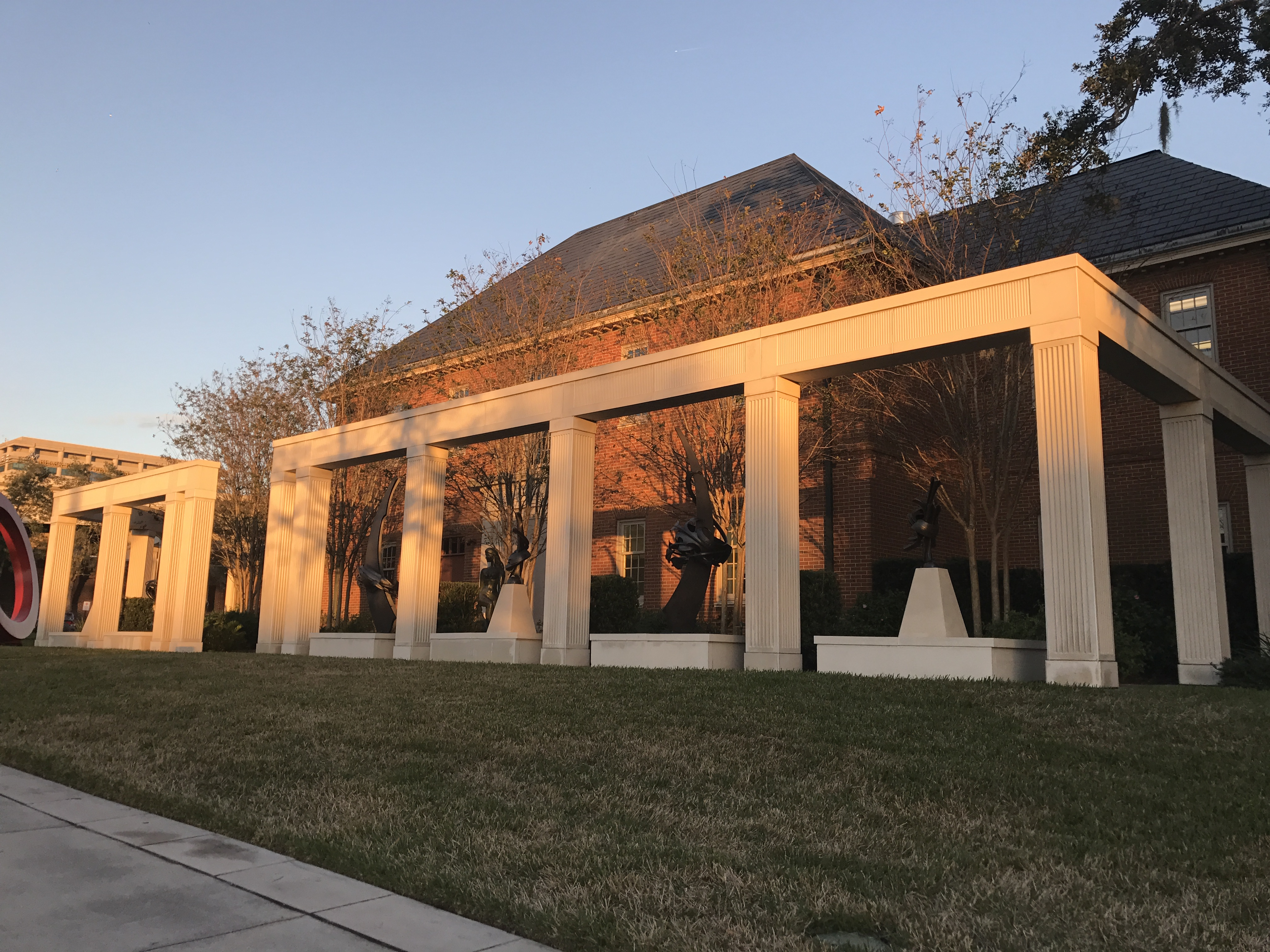
The Barnett building behind the museum's sculpture garden.

The Cummer Museum acquired the Barnett building in the early 1990s, remodeling the first floor into the museum's education center, Art Connections, and using the second floor for administrative offices. The two buildings were connected by the Barnett Concourse, and two more major galleries were added. This expansion was completed in 1992. In early 2002, the museum acquired the adjacent Woman's Club of Jacksonville, a Tudor-style residential building which would serve as a space for programs and events for the museum. The museum also acquired the Jacobsen Gallery of American Art in 2005, and the Mason Gallery in 2006.

On January 25, 2010, the Cummer Gardens were added to the National Register of Historic Places.

In March 2016, the board of trustees of the Cummer Museum of Art & Gardens announced that the old Woman's Club of Jacksonville, which was to become a center for programming for the museum, would have to be demolished because of an infestation of Formosan subterranean termites, costing the museum its $7 million investment into the building. It had been previously listed on the National Register of Historic Places.

== Collection ==
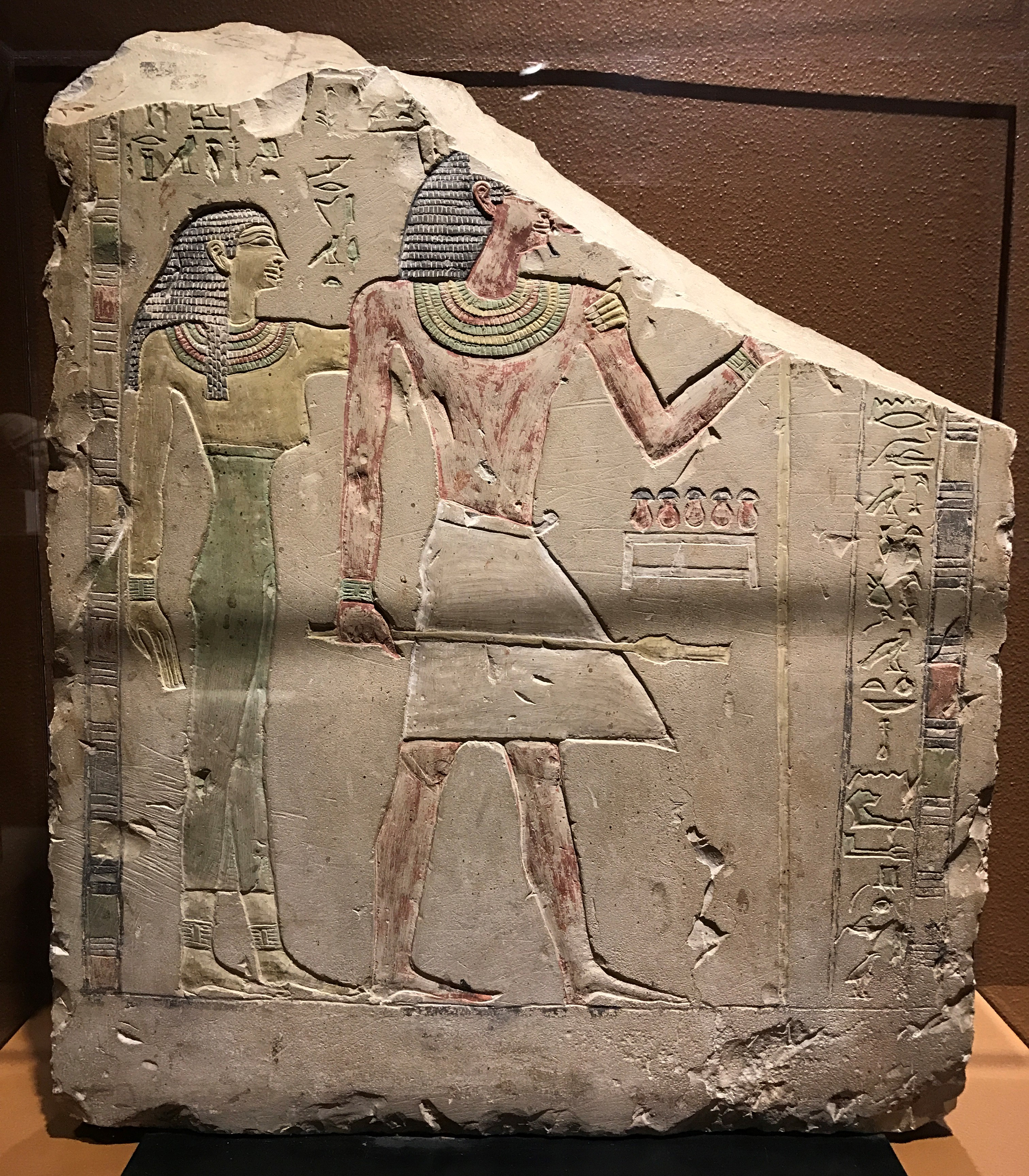
Stele of Iku and Mer-imat, c. 2100 BCE

The Cummer Museum's art collection has expanded from the group of more than 60 works of Ninah Cummer's collection to over 5,000 works of art. The permanent collection spans from 2100 BCE through the 21st century and includes pieces created by Peter Paul Rubens, Winslow Homer, Thomas Moran, Norman Rockwell, and Romare Bearden. It is also home to the Wark Collection of Early Meissen Porcelain. Pieces in the museum's collection were either donated to the museum, like the Wark collection, or purchased using the museum's acquisition fund, which is sustained through individual gifts and fundraising events.

=== Special collections ===
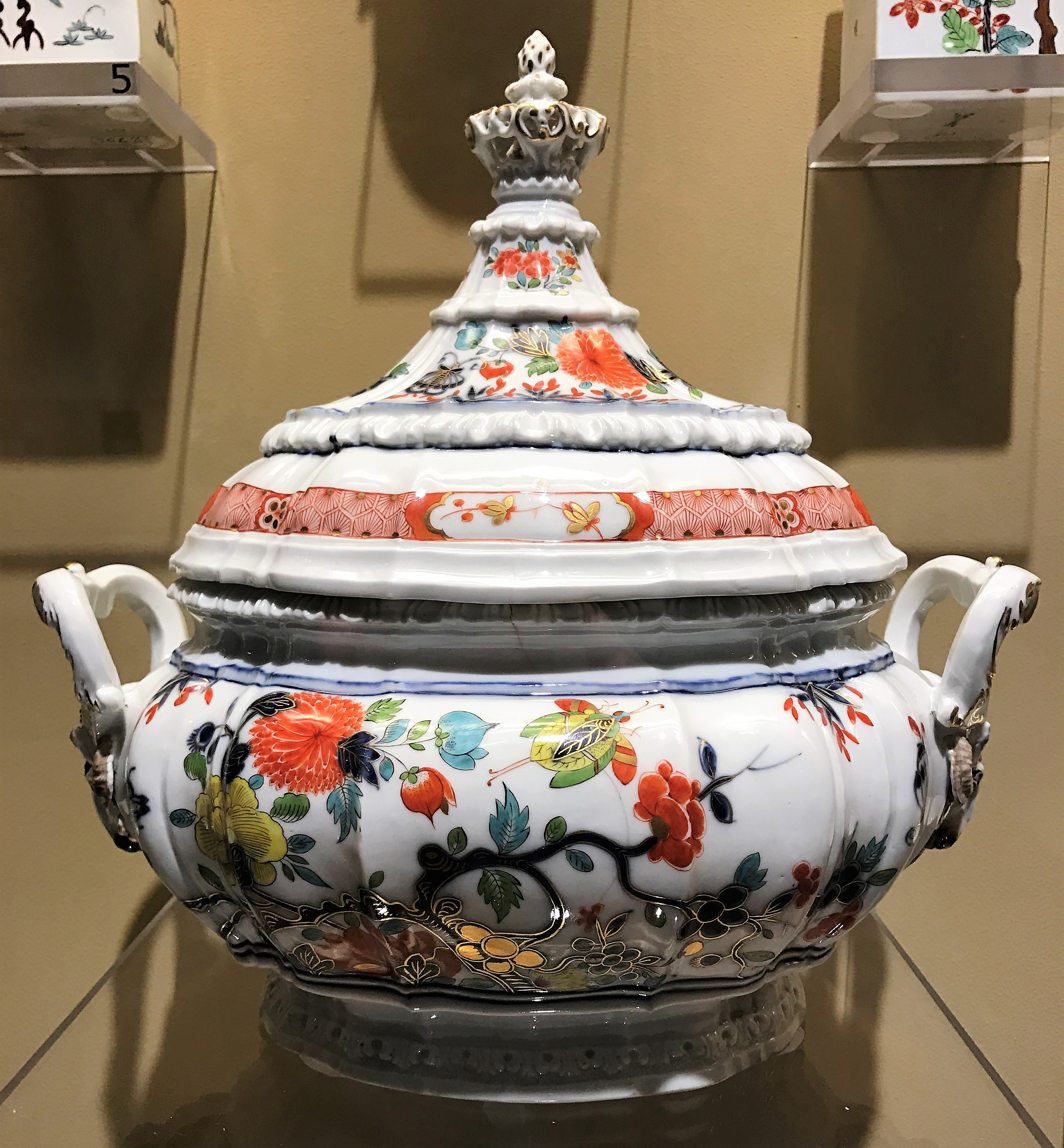
A piece of the museum's Meissen porcelain collection.

The Cummer Museum possesses seven special collections:

- The Constance I. and Ralph H. Wark Collection of Early Meissen Porcelain – Ralph Wark began collecting Meissen porcelain in 1922. Over the years, he acquired a collection of over 700 pieces. Wark and his sister Constance moved to St. Augustine and donated the collection to the Cummer in 1965.
- The Eugène Louis Charvot Collection – Over 200 works produced by Eugène Louis Charvot, a French doctor and army officer as well as a painter.
- Joseph Jeffers Dodge Collection – 230 works by American realist artist Joseph Jeffers Dodge.
- The Dennis C. Hayes Collection of Japanese Prints – A collection of 190 Japanese prints that encompass the 19th and 20th centuries.
- The James McBey Collection – One of the largest collection of James McBey's works outside of his native Scotland, this collection spans his entire career.
- The Eugene Savage Collection – A collection of works by National Academy of Design member Eugene Savage that depicts Seminole traditions in the 1930s.
- Permanent Collection Archives and Rare Books – A collection of archival materials and rare books that supplement the other special collections, which includes a portion of the Cummers' personal library.
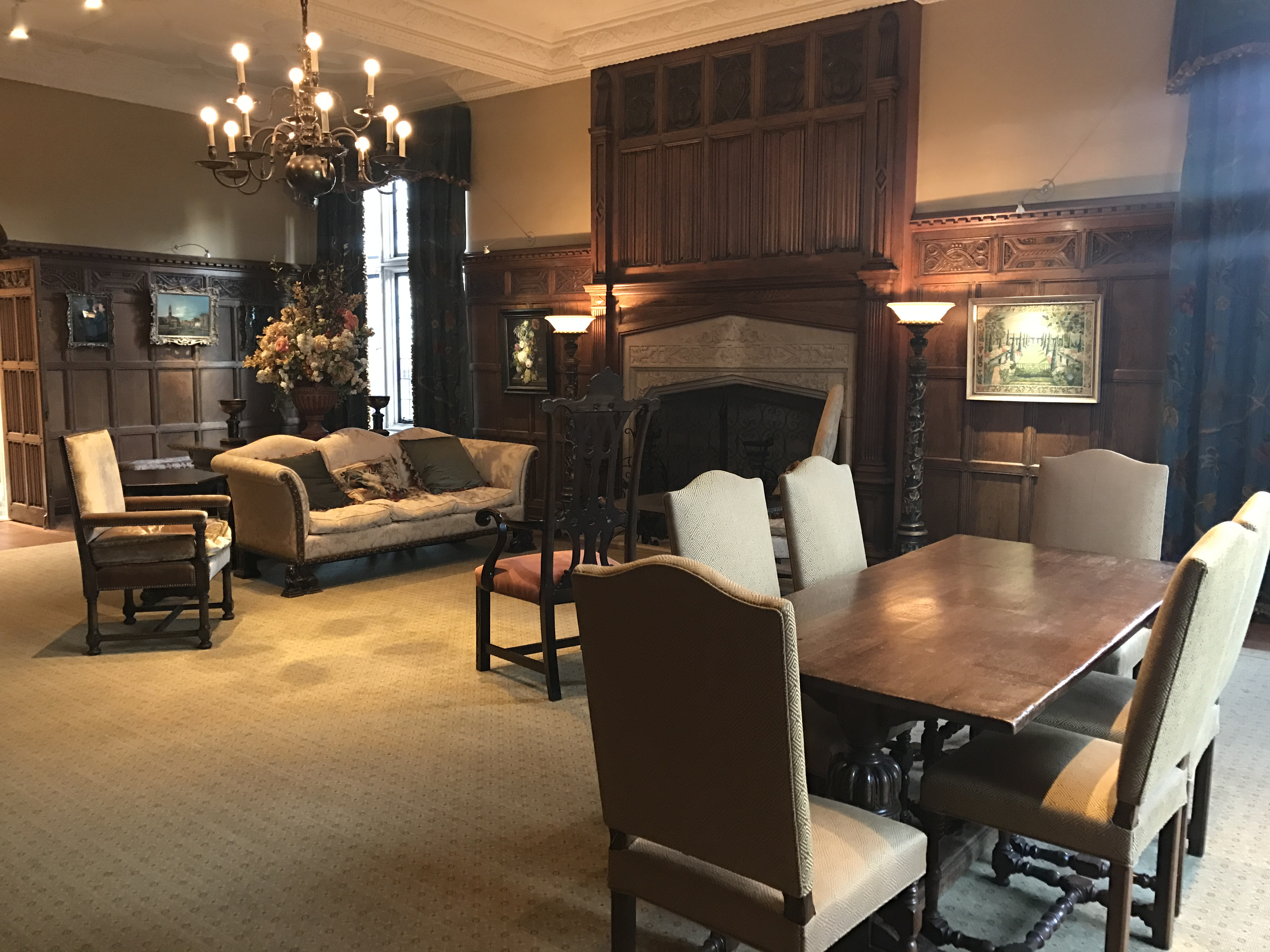
  The Tudor Room

=== Tudor Room ===
One room from the original Cummer home, known as the Tudor Room, was preserved in order that "the public at large may enjoy some insight into the personality of the owner." It retains all of its historic furniture, including a number of paintings from the Cummers' original collection. It also features portraits of both Ninah and Arthur Cummer, as well as a needlepoint by Ninah depicting her Italian Garden.

=== Sculptures ===
A number of sculptures that are a part of the Permanent Collection are displayed in the landscape around the museum. Janet Scudder's Running Boy is on display in the courtyard, and Riis Burwell's Entropy Series #26 sits above the Italian Garden. A sculpture of Mercury by an unknown artist stands in the center of the Olmsted Garden. Diana of the Chase, by American artist Anna Hyatt Huntington, is located in the upper tier of the gardens. A sculpture garden surrounds the outside of the Barnett building. Various other pieces are on display inside the museum.

== Gardens ==
The Cummer Gardens are 1.45 acres of historic gardens made up of native Florida plants, large live oak trees, and a number of reflecting pools, fountains, ornaments and sculptures. They are split into three themed gardens and a large lawn on the St. Johns River. Many of the original trees on the property were felled in order to make room for flower beds, but those that remained grew up to 150 feet in size. Ninah Cummer adopted the lion as her personal motif, and lion details can be found all over the gardens.

The first gardens on the Cummer property were designed by Ossian Cole Simonds in 1903, just after the adjoining house was completed. Thomas Meehan & Sons of Philadelphia redesigned this garden and created what would become known as the English Garden in 1910. Ellen Biddle Shipman designed the Italian Garden in 1931. Sections of Clara and Waldo's garden were designed by William Lyman Phillips, a partner in the Olmstead Brothers firm. The Olmsted Brothers also advised Ninah on a design for a wall garden in 1922, but she chose to plant a garden designed by William Mercer of Philadelphia. The Cummer Gardens were selected for the National Register of Historic Places because they represent the history of American landscape design in the first four decades of the twentieth century.

All of the Cummer's gardens are available to be toured virtually on the Cummer Museum's website with a stated purpose of serving to engage, educate, and inspire without it being necessary for a staff member to participate in the tour with each individual visitor. This also allows individuals to tour the garden virtually without having to visit the museum itself. Through the virtual garden tour, visitors can learn more about the gardens, plants, and sculptures in each garden.

In September 2017, the Cummer Gardens were severely impacted by Hurricane Irma, including extensive flood damage when the St. Johns River overflowed approximately four feet of water into the gardens. A $1.3 million reconstruction initiative for the English Garden, Italian Garden, and Olmsted Garden began in December 2018 and was completed in June 2019. The restoration plan was created using a variety of historic documents, including historic records, plant logs, photographs, and invoices from the initial creation of the gardens. The English Gardens reopened in April 2019, with all three gardens being completed and open to the public in July 2019.

=== English Garden ===
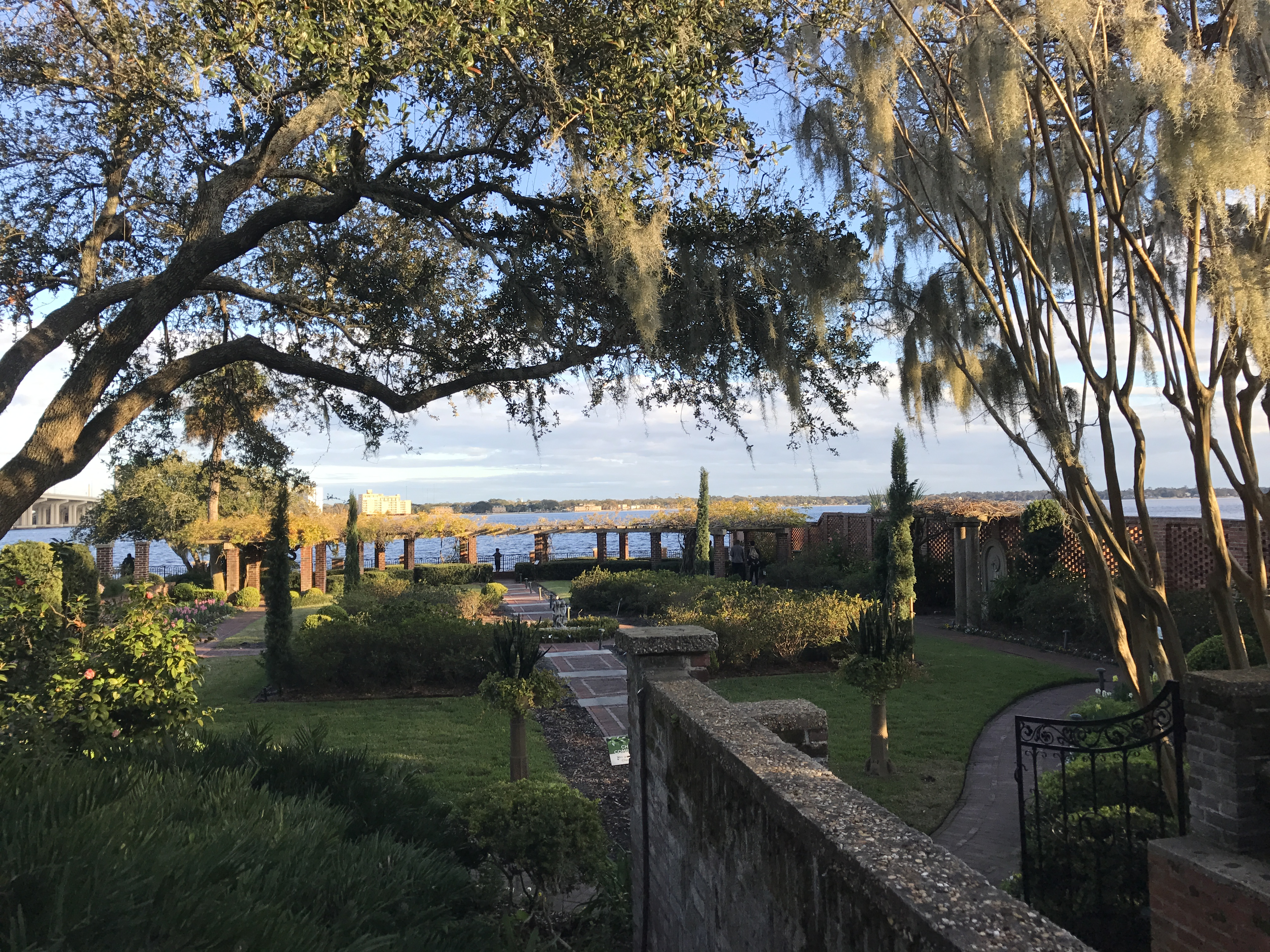
The English Garden

The English Garden is a rectangular garden featuring brick paths, a pergola that features cypress trees at the head of the garden, and a number of statues and garden ornaments. The garden has hundreds of native trees, shrubs, and perennials, most notably azaleas. It also features a wall garden, which was built in 1922. The centerpiece of the garden is a large wisteria arbor.

Thomas Meehan & Sons of Philadelphia designed the English Garden in 1910. It was first known as the Wisteria Garden. In 1925, Ninah attended a lecture on azaleas given by H. Harold Hume, a horticulturist known for his work with azaleas, camellias, and citrus. This lecture sparked her interest in azaleas, so she visited azalea gardens in Charleston, South Carolina for inspiration. Advised by Hume, she replanted much of her English garden with them, renaming it the Azalea Garden.

=== Italian Garden ===
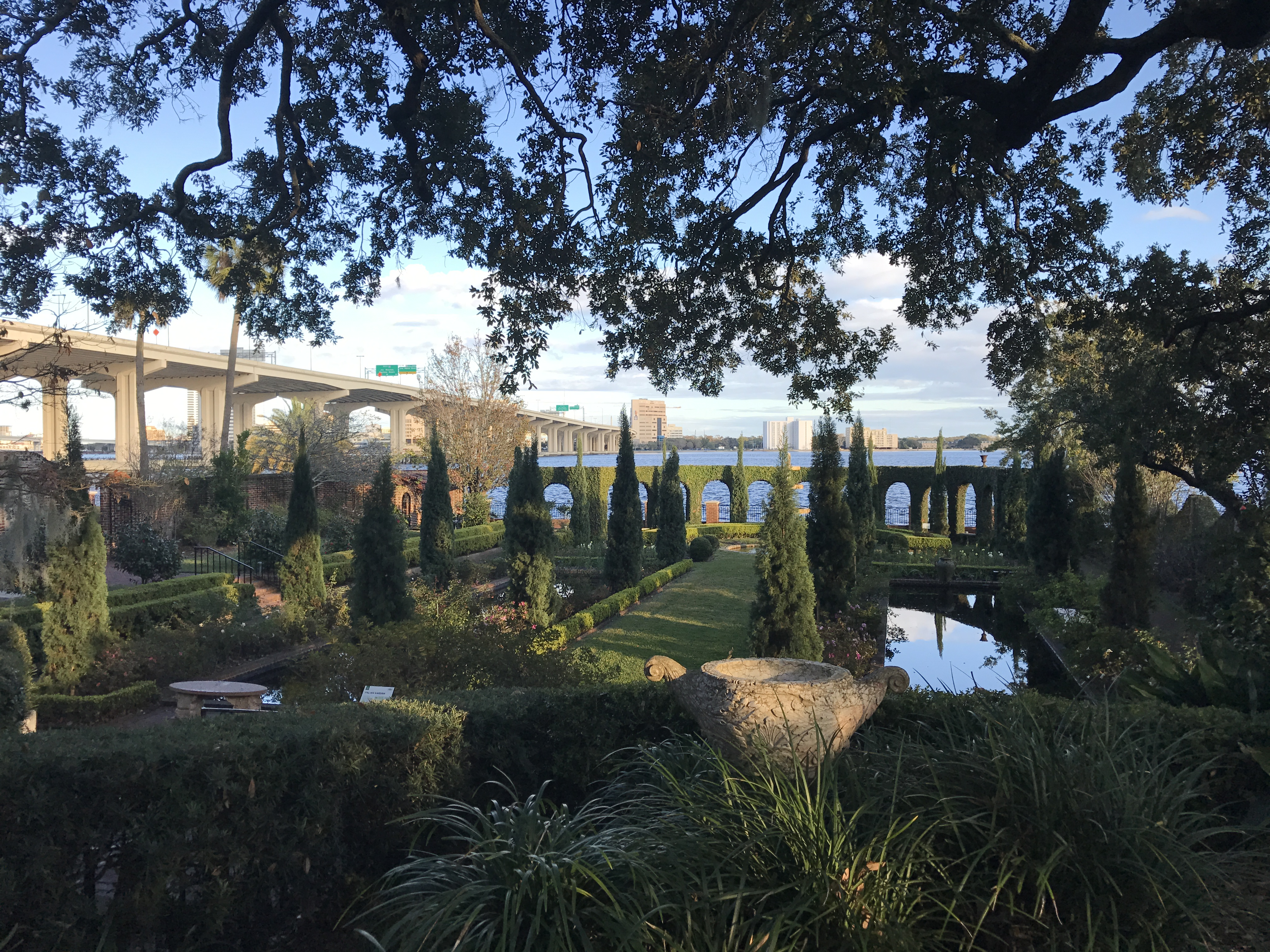
The Italian Garden

Ellen Biddle Shipman designed the Italian Garden in May 1931. It features two rows of clipped evergreens between two long, rectangular reflecting pools. It has a focal point at the end of the garden in the form of a marble fountain surrounded by an arched gloriette. There are also a number of statues, ornaments, tubs of small trees, and flowers.

In 2002, the focal fountain, made of Verona aggregate that had deteriorated over time, was replaced with an exact reproduction of Botticino marble, sculpted by Nicola Stagetti in Pietrasanta, Italy.

=== The Olmsted Garden ===
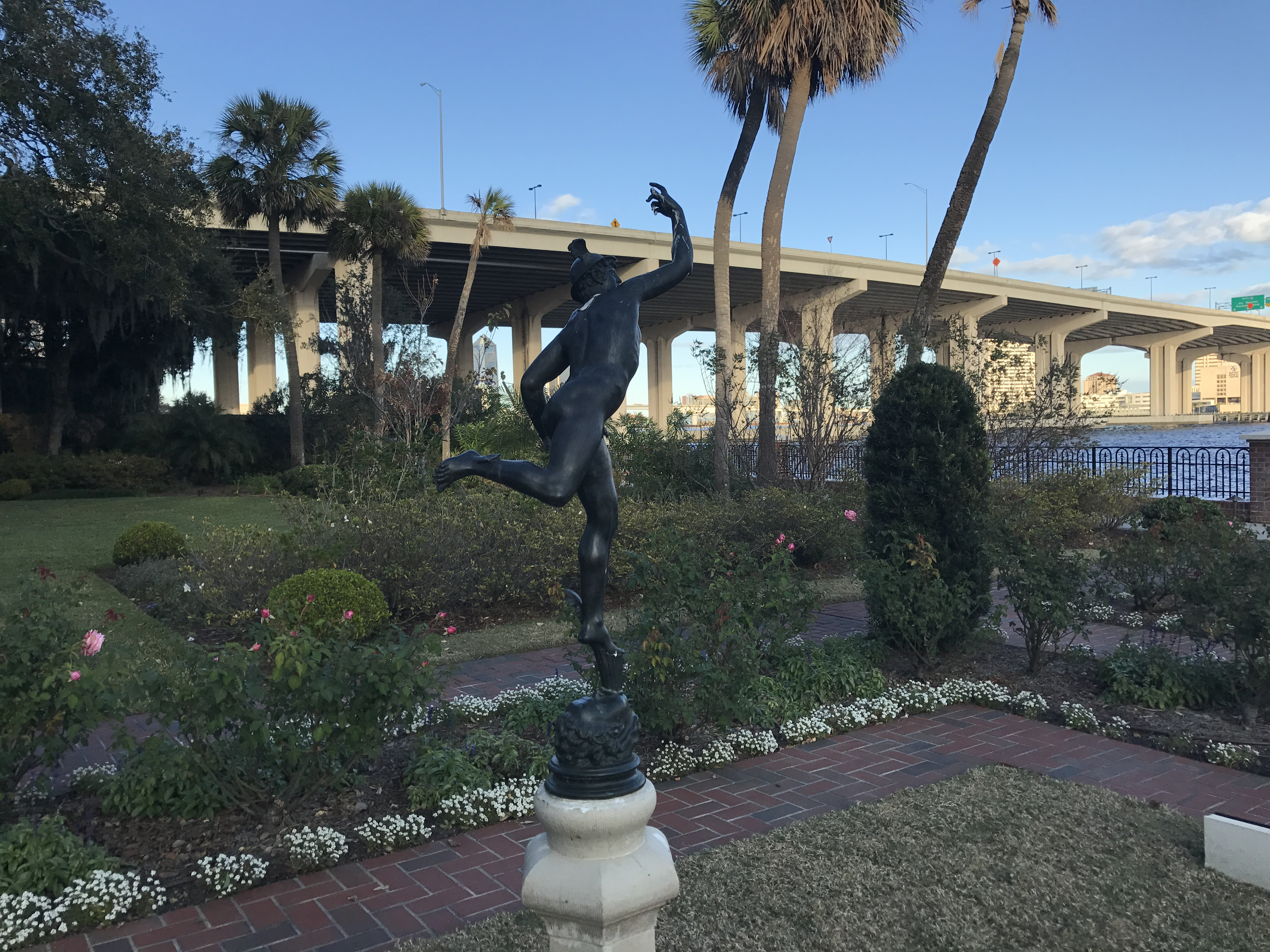
The statue of Mercury in the Olmsted Garden

The Olmsted Garden was designed by the Olmsted Brothers, sons of Frederick Law Olmsted, the designer of Central Park in New York City. It was located behind Waldo and Clara's home. It features numerous varieties of flowers and trees, a curved staircase, portico, and three garden rooms.

After the property was sold in 1960, the garden fell into disrepair, but with the purchase of the Barnett building, plans were made to restore it using historical photographs. The restoration to the original layout was completed in 2013. In its prime, the garden's centerpiece was a neoclassical bronze statue of Mercury by an unknown artist. The statue was given away in the 1960s, but it was donated back to the museum around 2013, to be displayed in the restored garden.

=== Cummer Oak ===
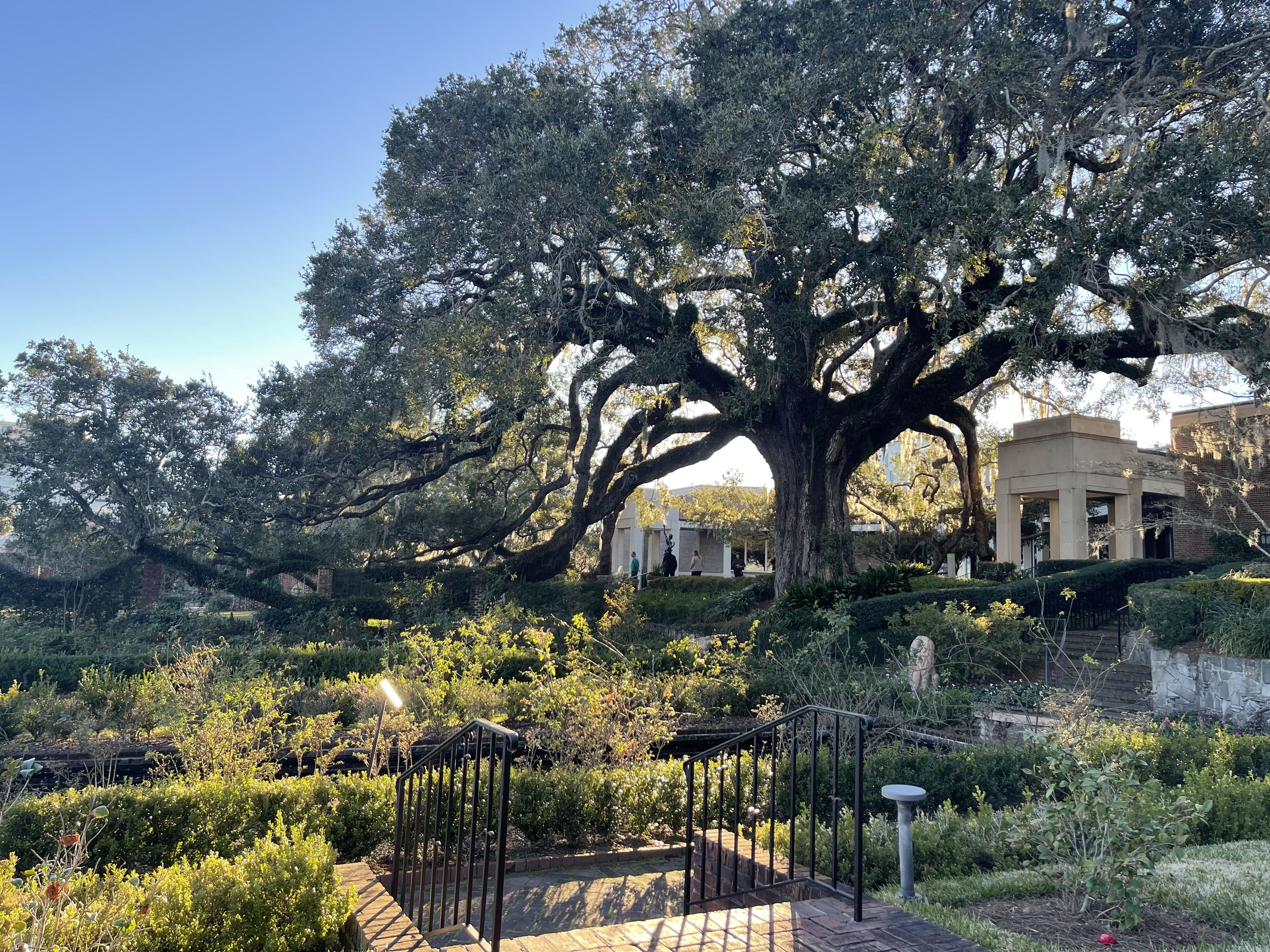
Cummer Gardens oak trees

The Cummer oak is a large live oak tree, estimated to be between 400 and 450 years old, that stands prominently over the gardens. It is 80 feet tall, 138 feet across, and has a trunk circumference of 21 feet.

== Education ==
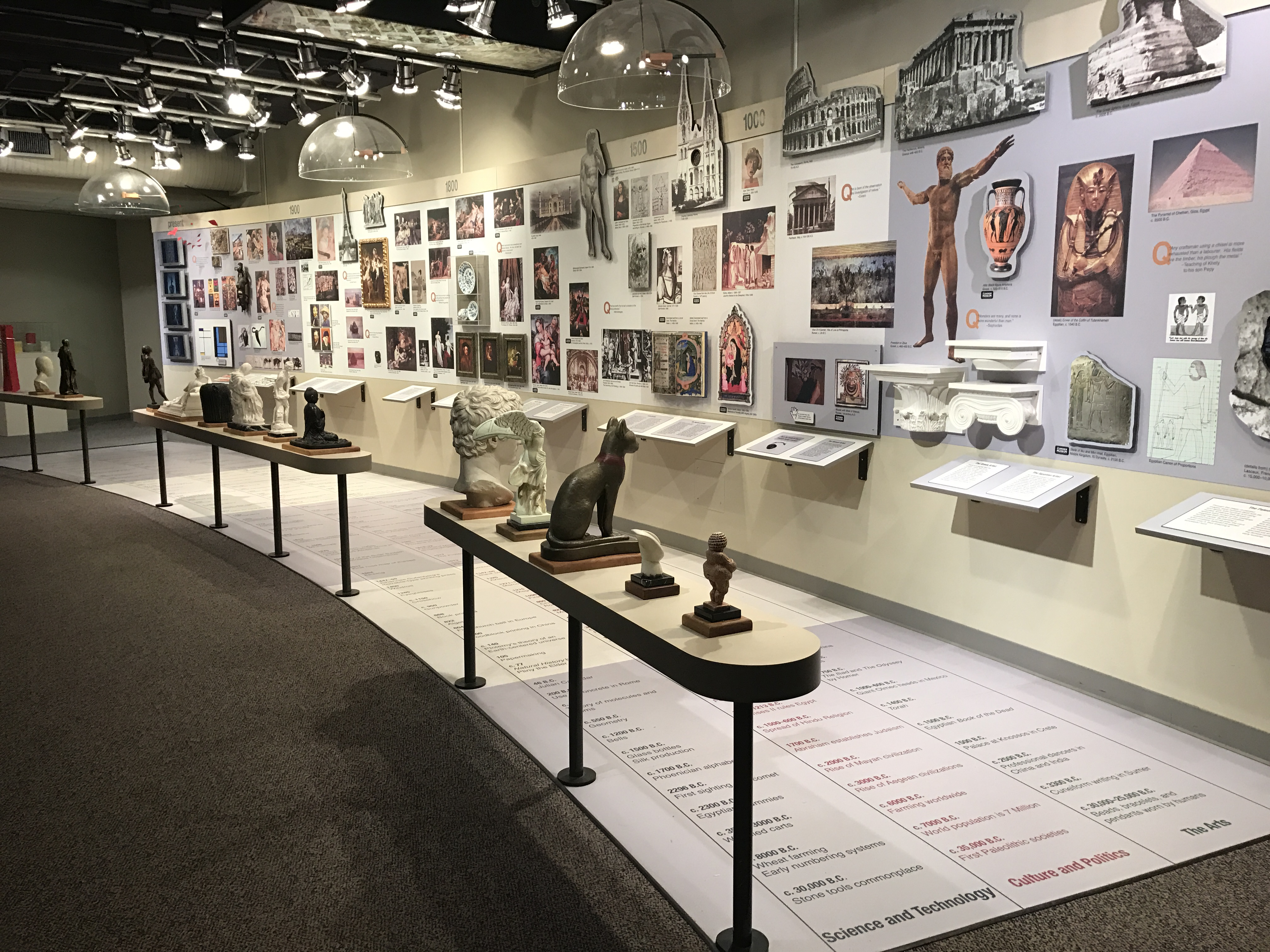
A timeline of art history located in Art Connections.

The 1992 expansion of the museum made space for a new education center named Art Connections. Art Connections has allowed thousands of local schoolchildren an art education experience through hands-on experiences, art classes, and special tours for students. In 1994, Art Connections received the National Award for Museum Service from the Institute of Museum and Library Services for outstanding community service.

Art Connections underwent a complete renovation in 2004. Most of the work went into installing new, high-tech activities, including a virtual canvas powered by a laser-light paintbrush and a room that turns dancers' shadows into art on the wall.

Art Connections houses a number of educational programs, such as Women of Vision, Junior Docents, the VSA Arts Festival, Cummer in the Classroom, and the Weaver Academy of Art.

The Very Special Arts Festival is an annual festival for special education students hosted at the Cummer Museum that saw over 2,000 students and 1,000 volunteers in 2014. Guided by museum volunteers, students engage in hands-on art projects, some of which have gone on to be displayed in the museum.

The Weaver Academy of Art at The Cummer Museum was created in 2007 for underserved elementary school-aged children. The program serves more than 3,000 students and 200 teachers in the local area. The program, the largest educational program at the Cummer Museum, provides museum tours, classroom outreach, training for teachers, and free passes for teachers and students.

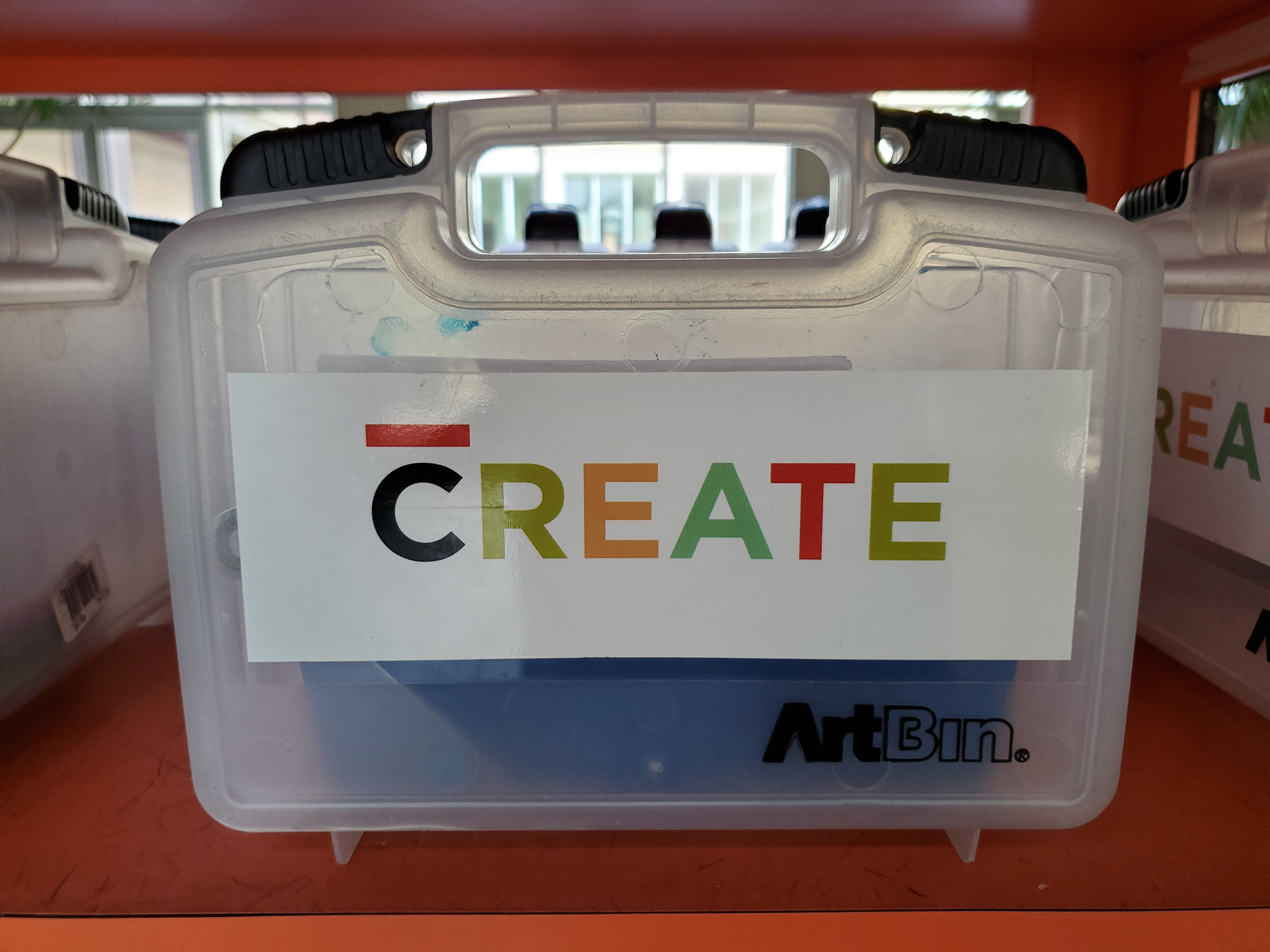
A CREATE Box on the CREATE Cart in the Uible Loggia

Families with young children can check out a Family Backpack from the help desk in the Art Connections Interactive Center on the north end of the museum. Each Family Backpack contains materials and activities geared toward younger visitors and families to help them discover and understand the meaning, moods, and elements of art while at the museum. Family Backpacks are currently available in four themes: Animals, Color Splash, Gardens, and My Family.

Visitors can create their own art while exploring the galleries and gardens by visiting the CREATE Cart in the Uible Loggia. On the CREATE Cart, visitors will find boxes containing a clipboard with paper, colored pencils, and a pencil sharpener. These boxes can be checked out with no fee by visitors and should be returned to the cart before leaving the museum.

== Publications ==
The Cummer Museum of Art & Gardens has published two books. These are The Chef's Canvas Cookbook (2016) and A Legacy in Bloom: Celebrating a Century of Gardens at the Cummer (2008), both of which have been previously available for purchase at the museum's shop.

== Gallery ==
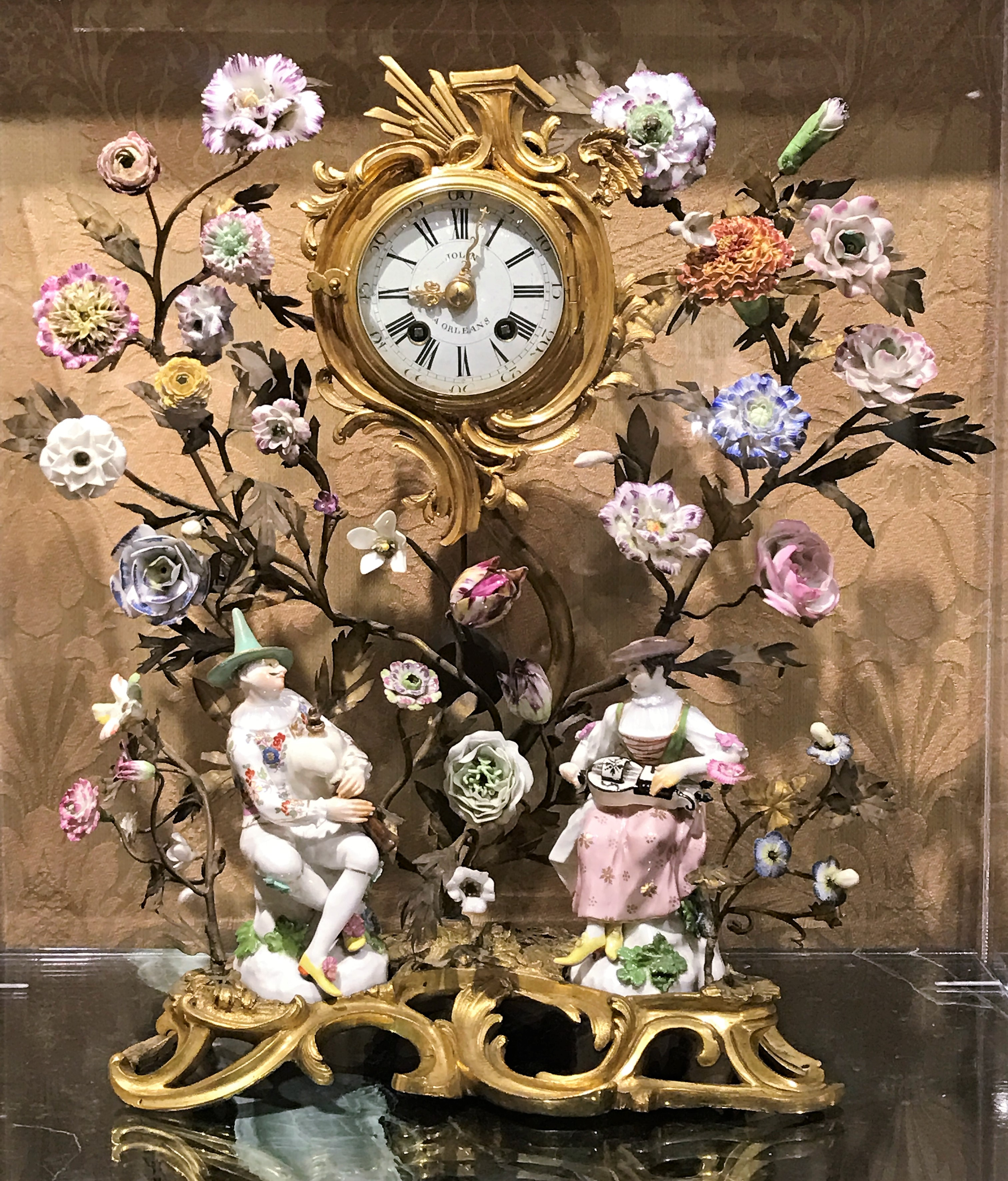
Johann Joachim Kändler, Ormolu Mantel Clock with Meissen Figurines, c. 1735

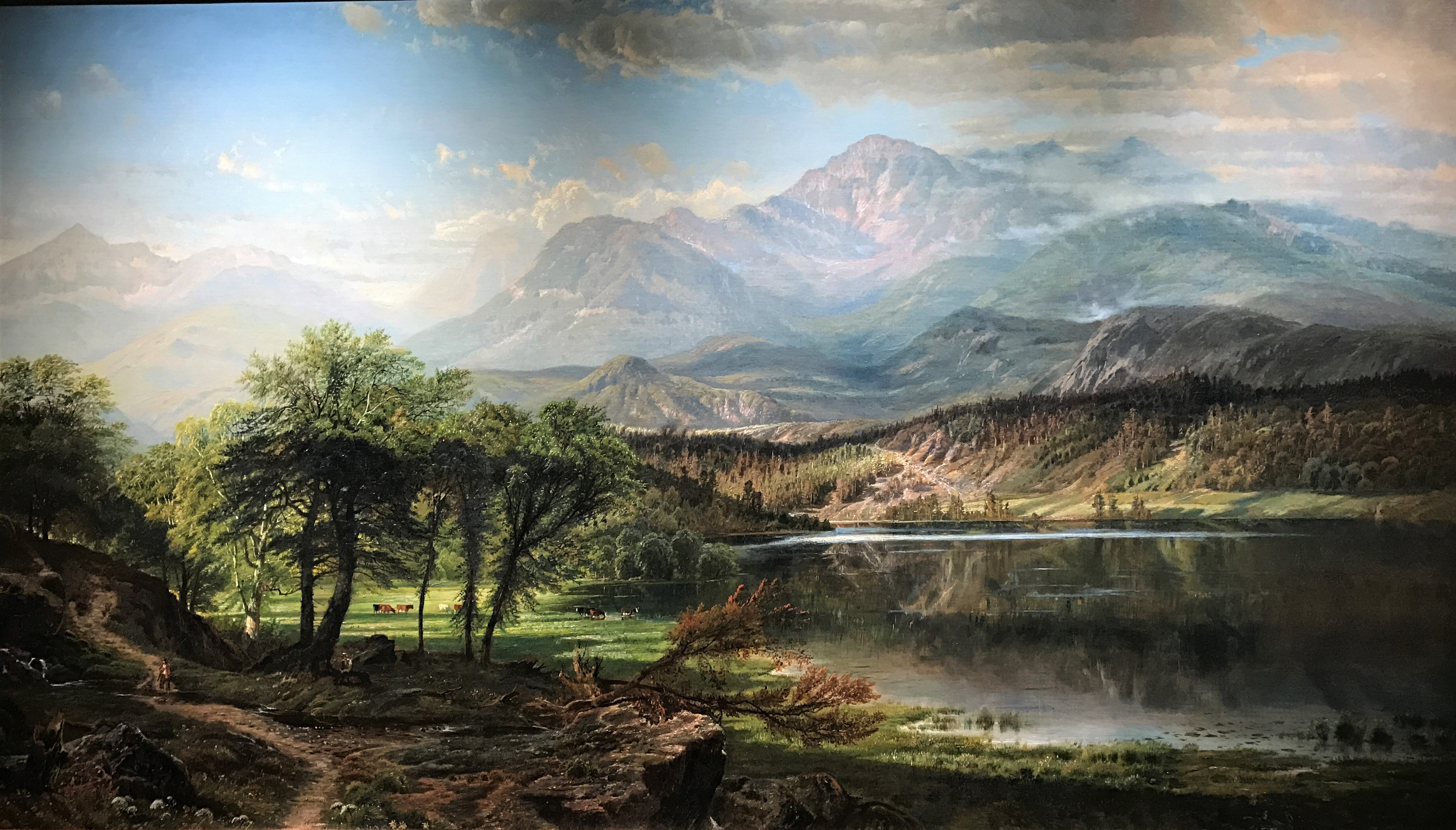
Edmund Darch Lewis, Mount Washington, New Hampshire, c. 1865

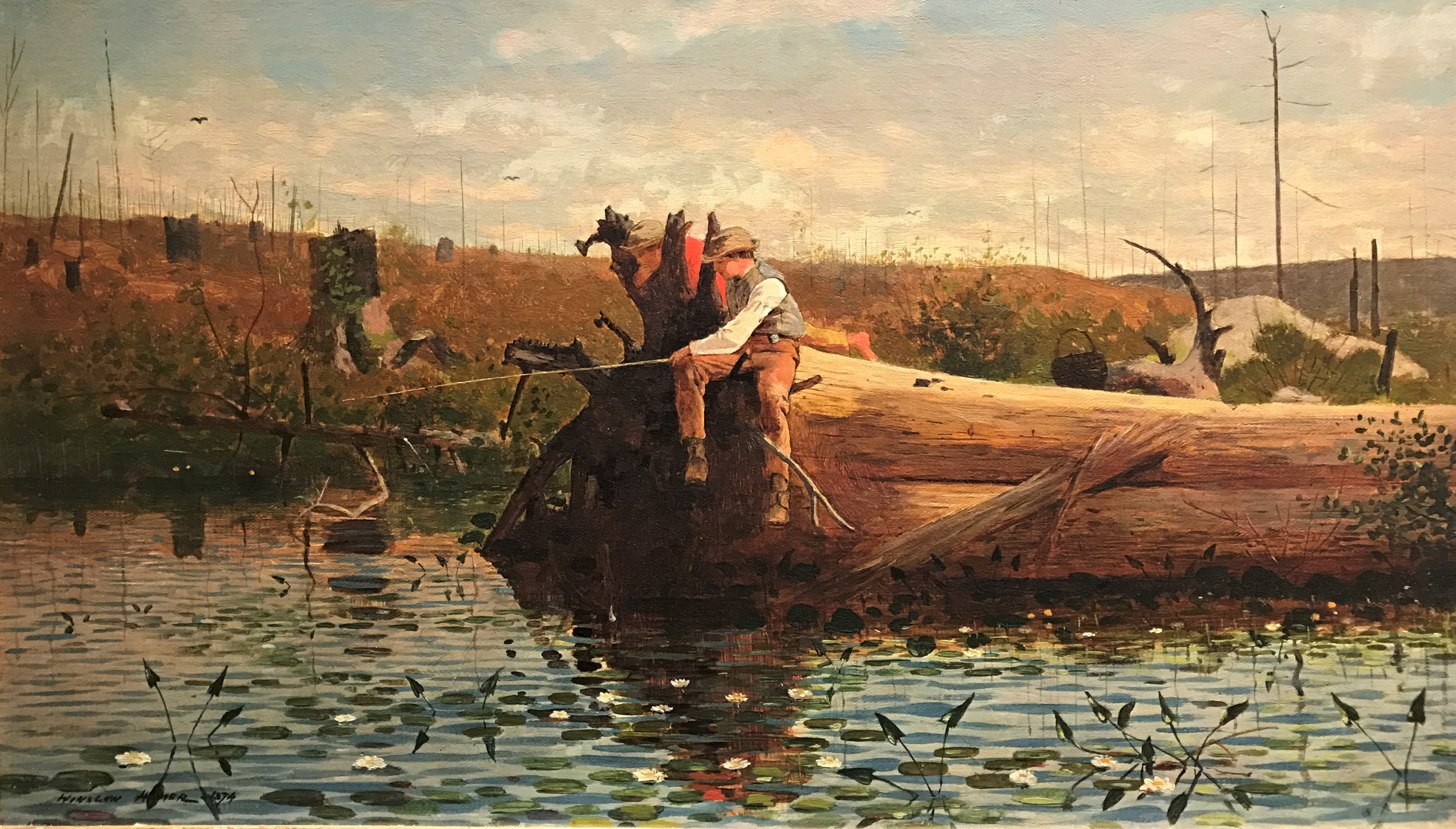
Winslow Homer, Waiting for a Bite, c. 1874

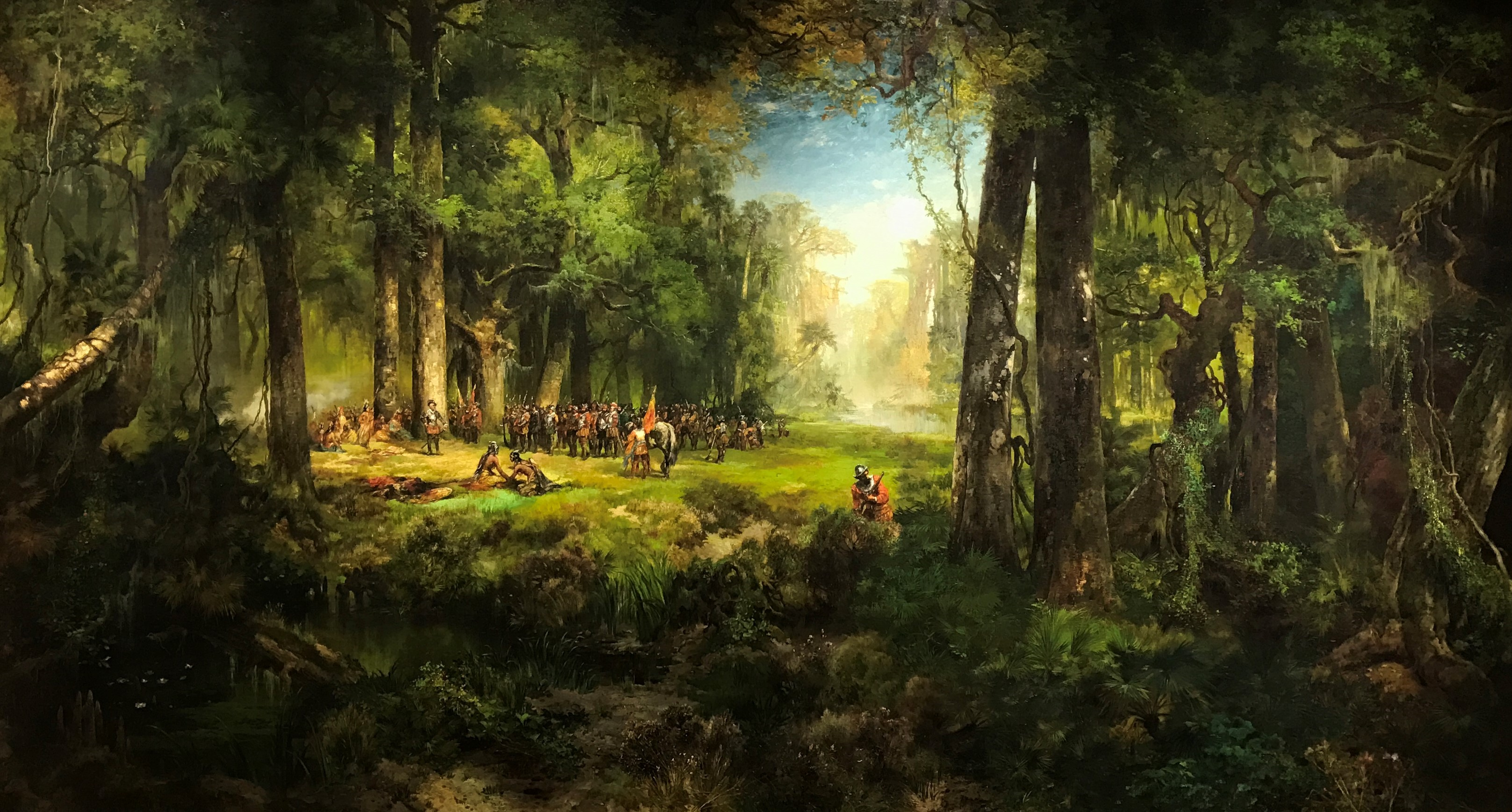
Thomas Moran, Ponce de León in Florida, c. 1877-1878

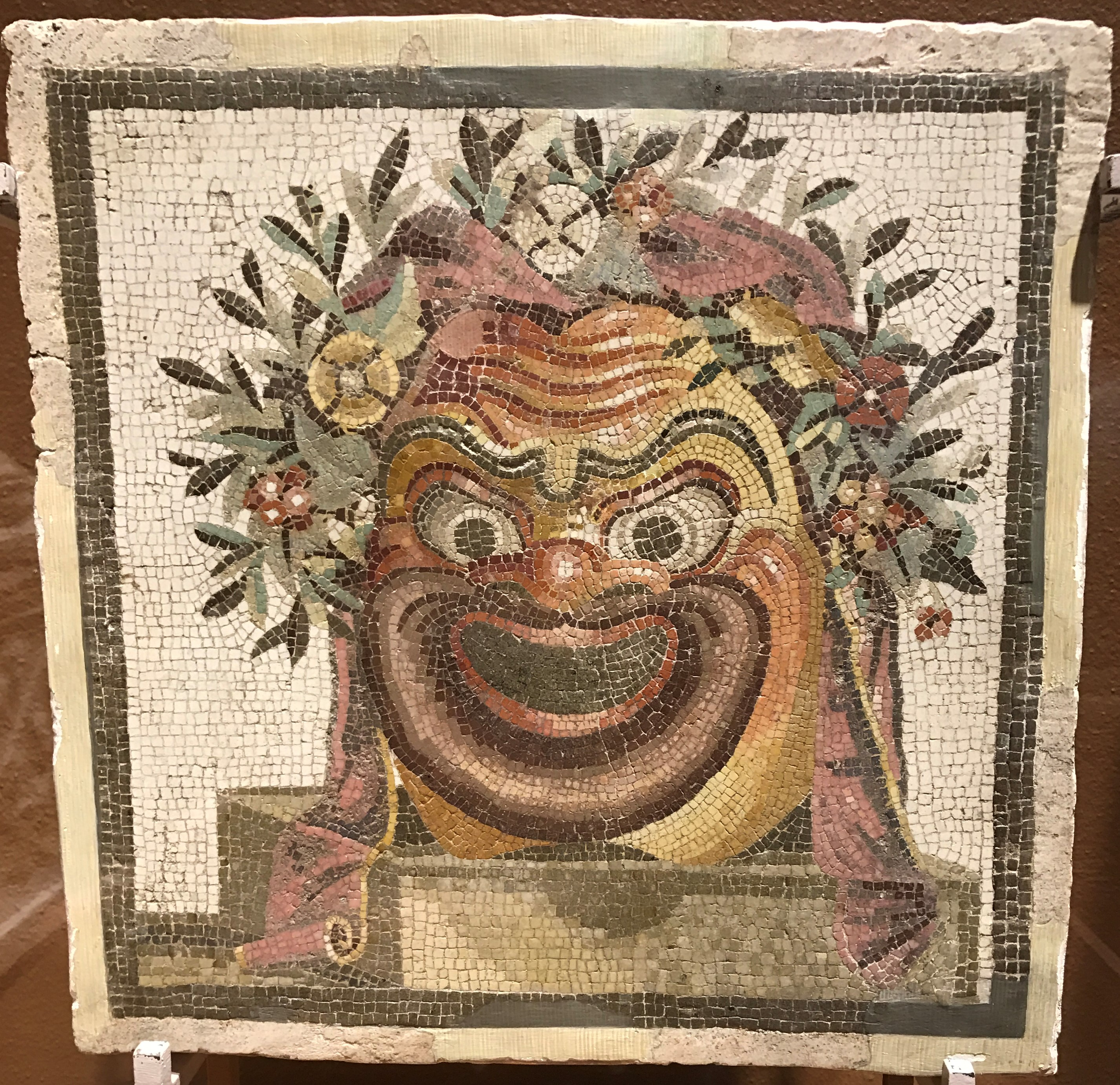
Unknown artist, Mosaic with mask of Silenus, c. 100 CE

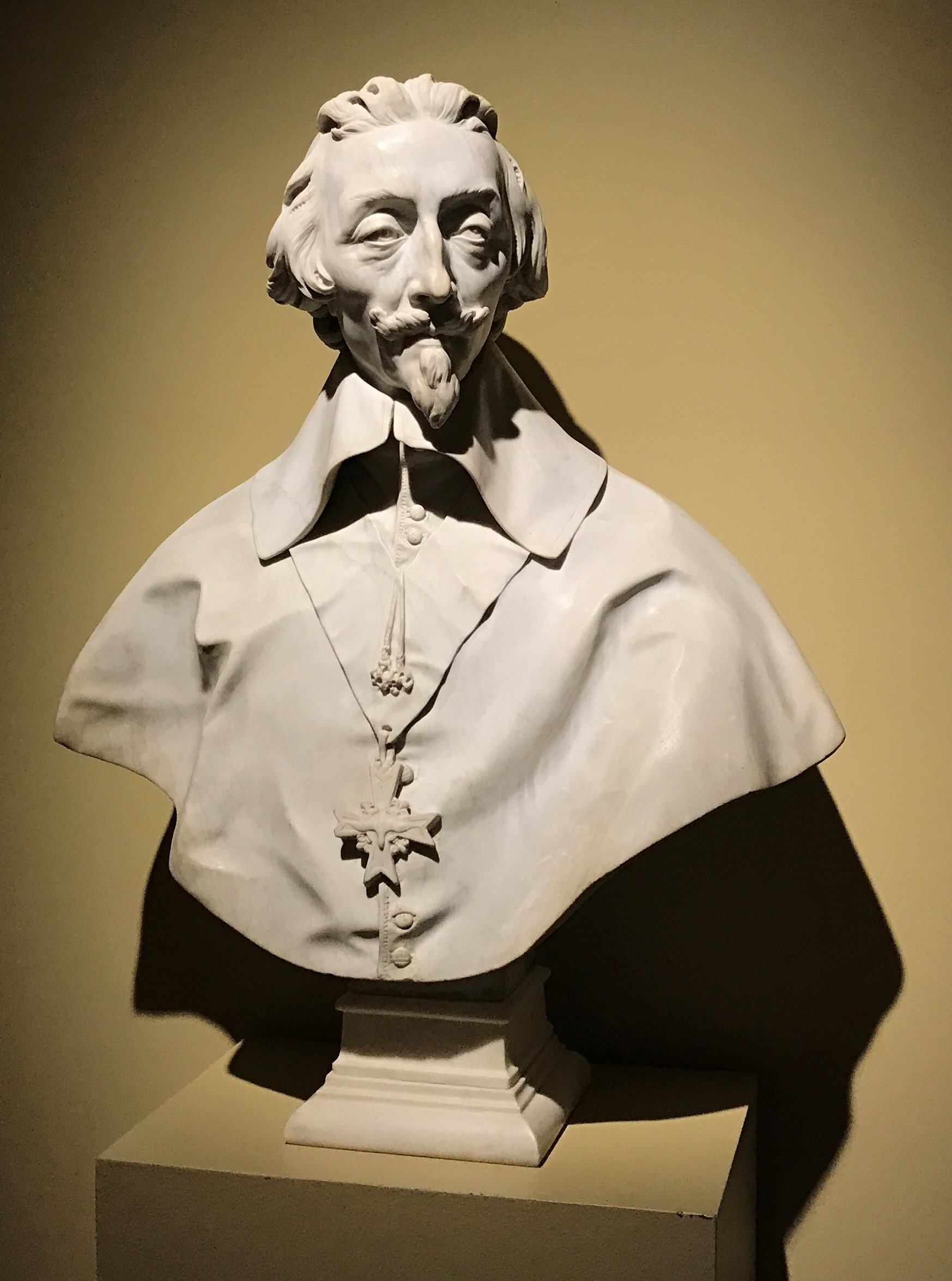
Workshop of Gian Lorenzo Bernini, Armand Jean du Plessis, Cardinal de Richelieu, c. 1641

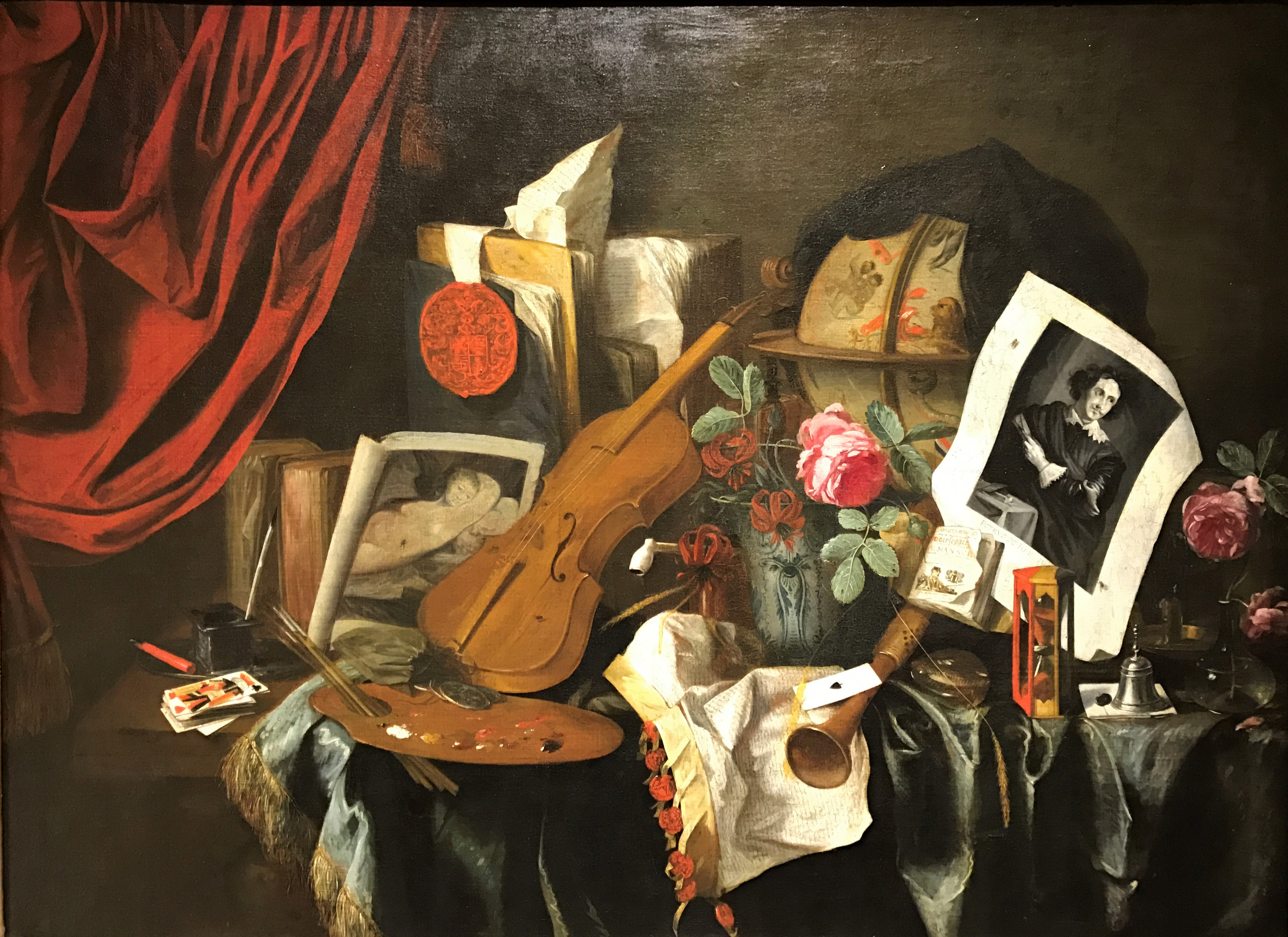
Jacques de Claeuw, Vanitas, c. 1677

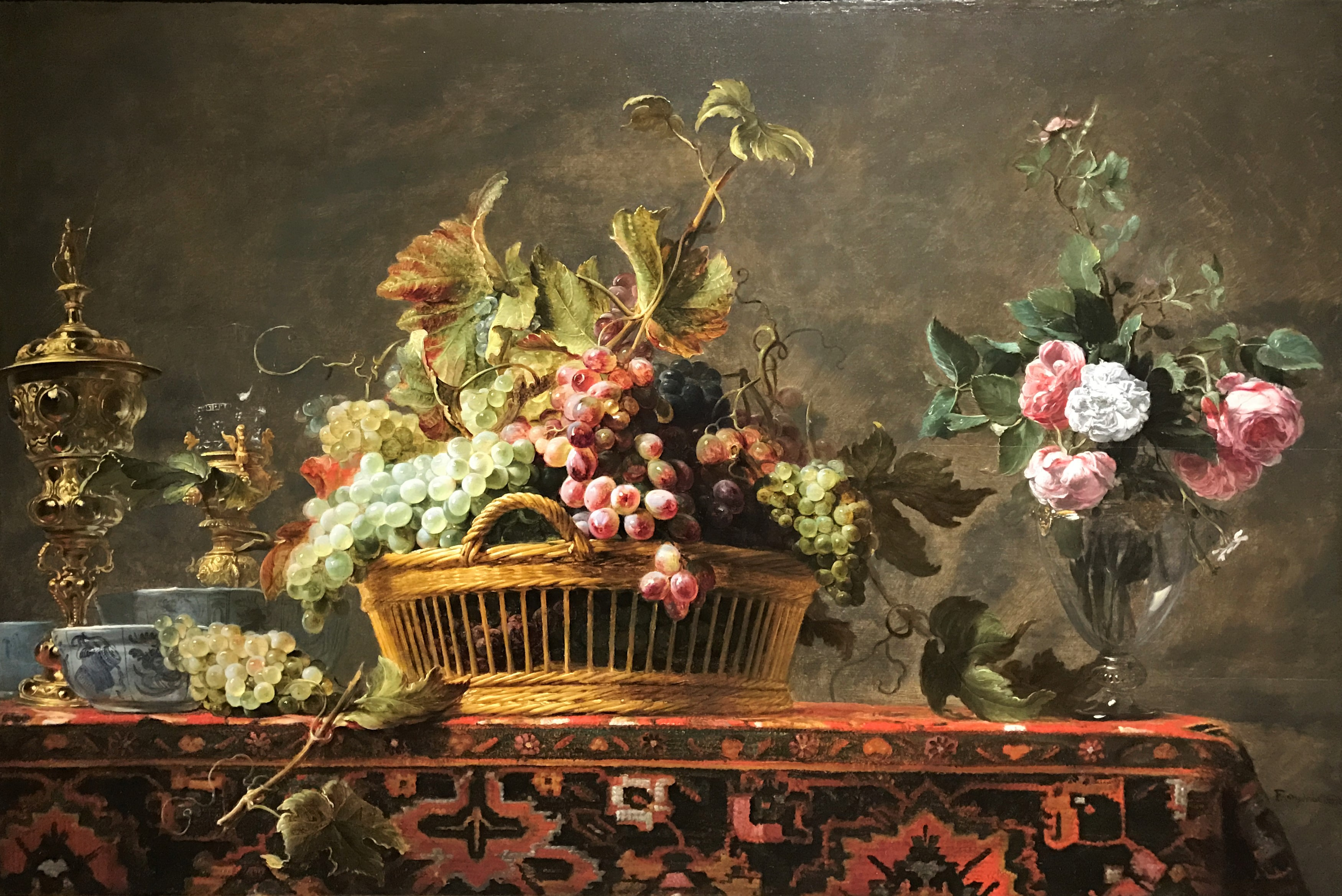
Frans Snyders, Still Life with Fruit and Flowers, c. 1630

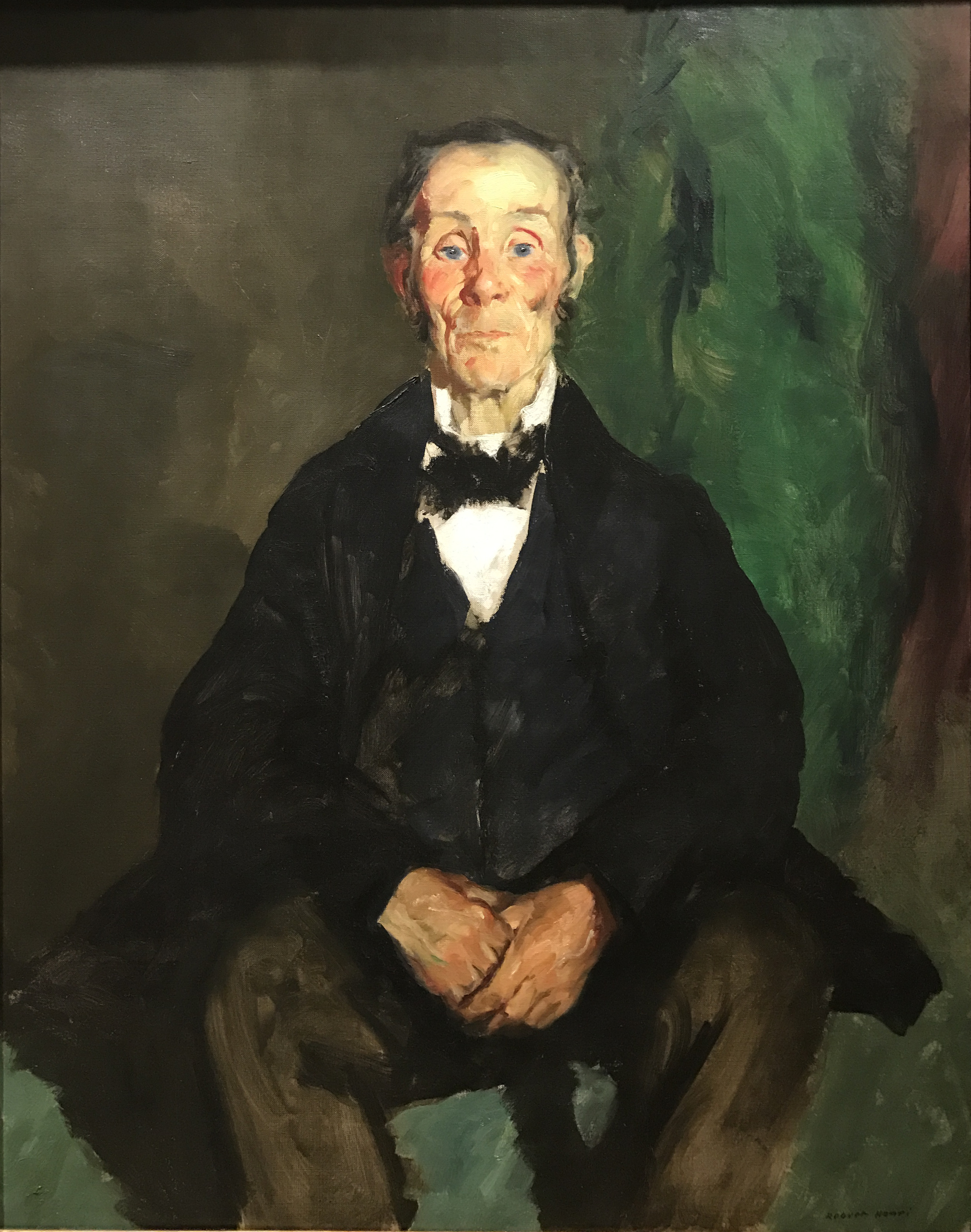
Robert Henri, Guide to Croaghan (Brian O'Malley), c. 1913

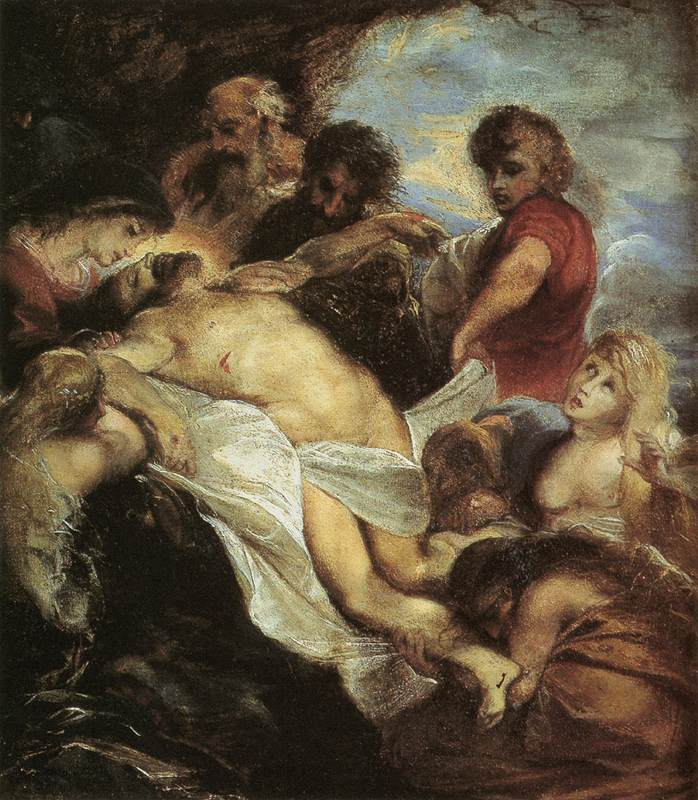
Peter Paul Rubens, The Lamentation, c. 1602

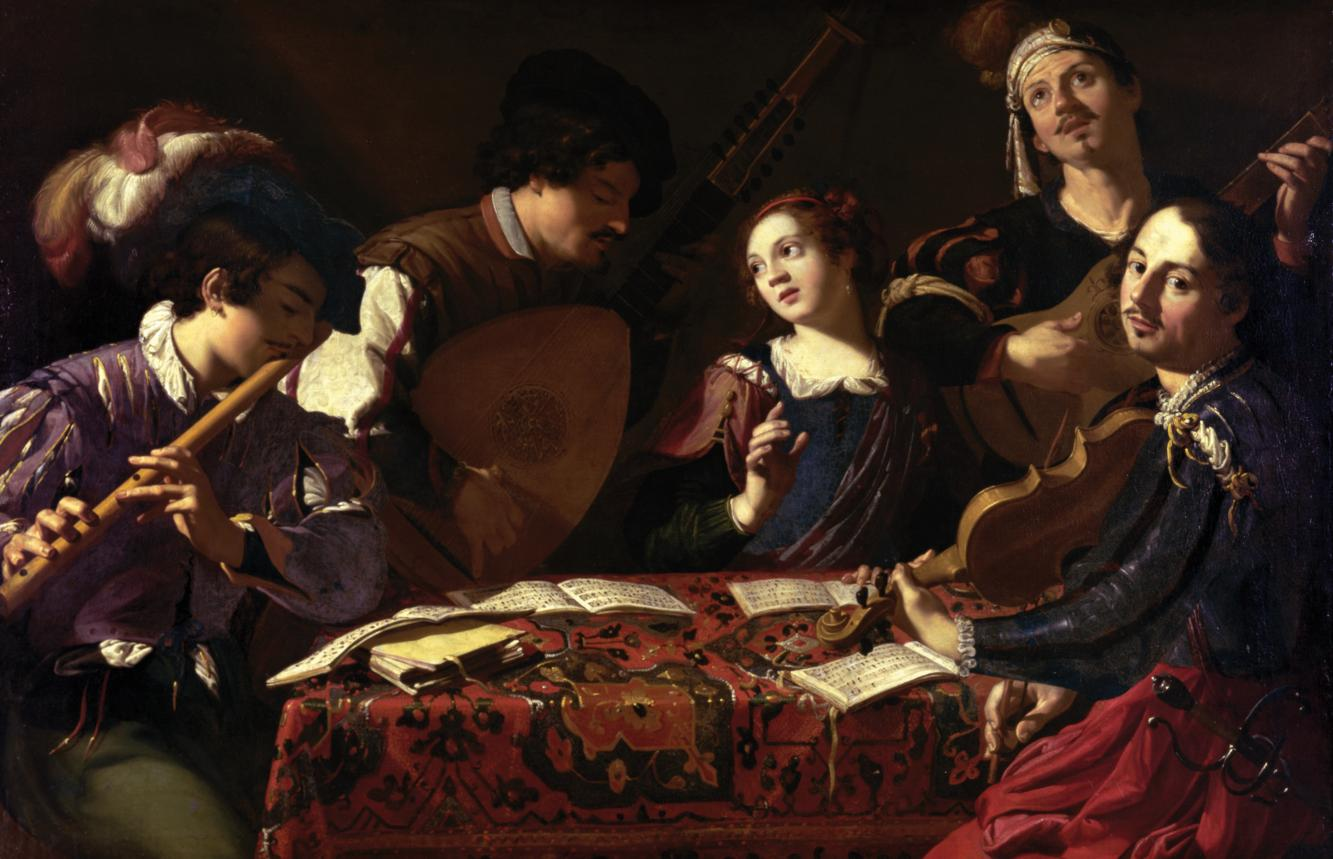
Theodoor Rombouts, The Concert, c. 1620

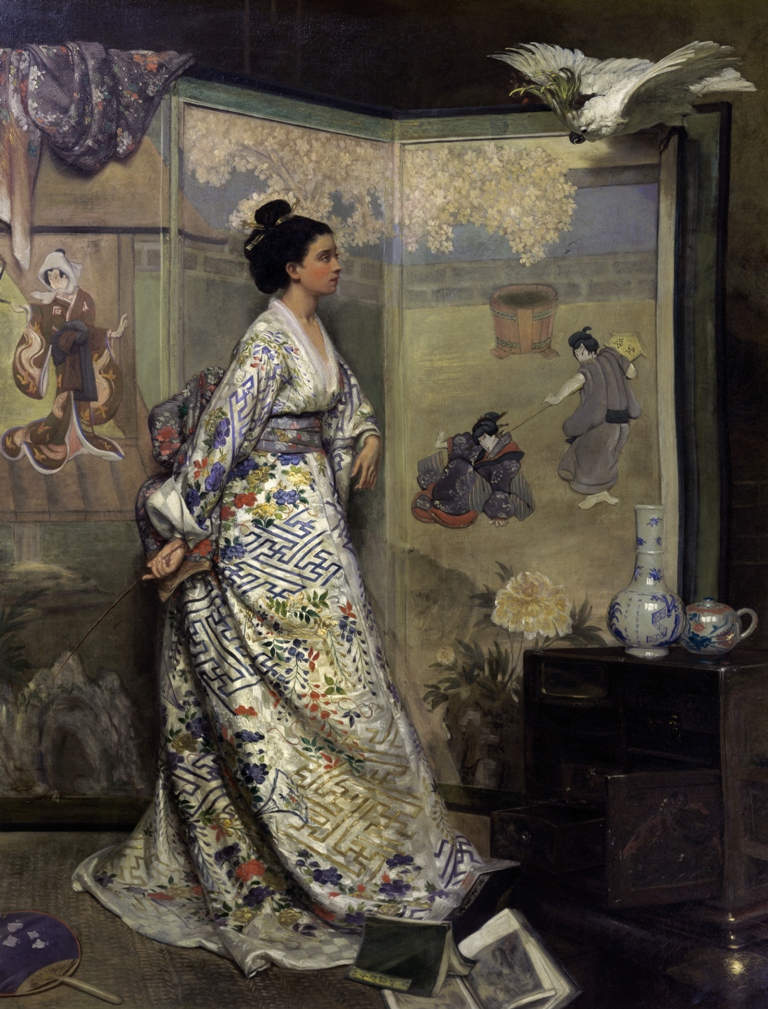
Gustave Léonard de Jonghe, The Japanese Fan, c. 1865

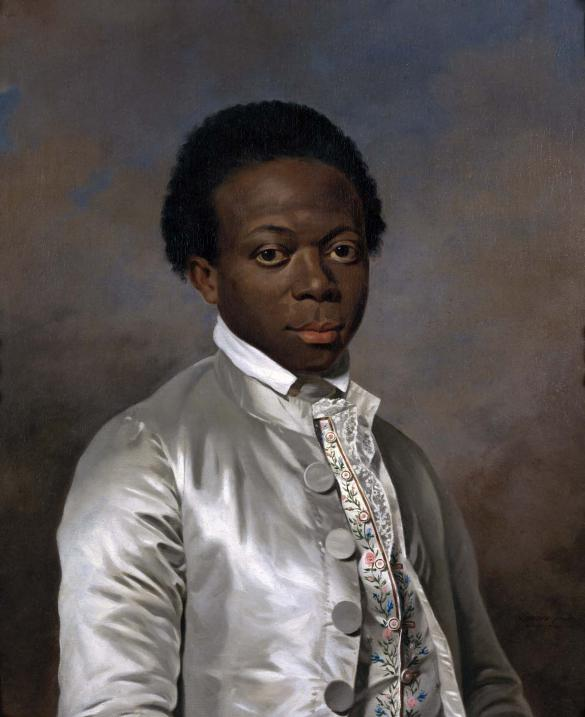
Marie Victoire Lemoine, Portrait of Zamor, c. 1785

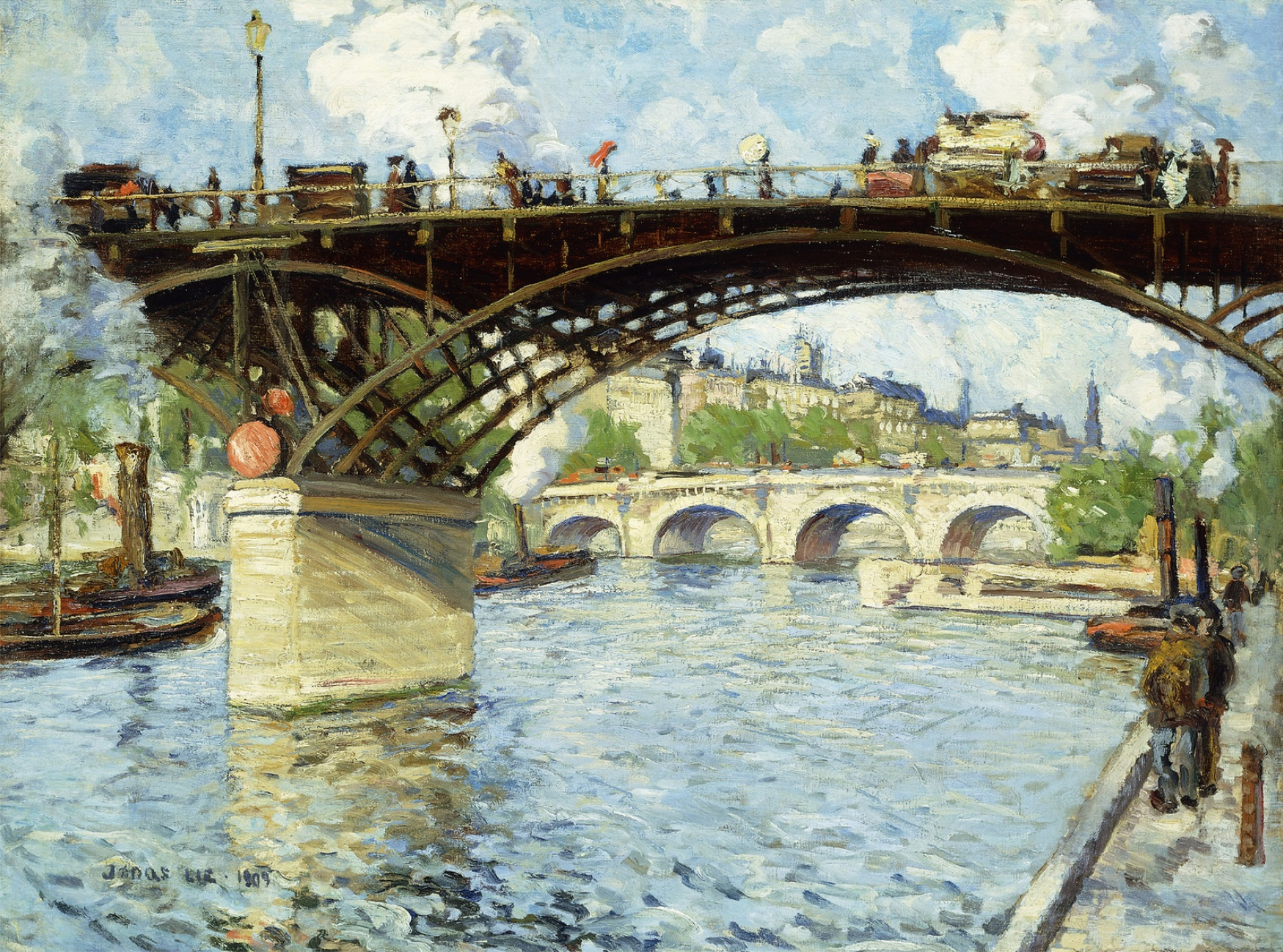
Jonas Lie, View of the Seine, c. 1909

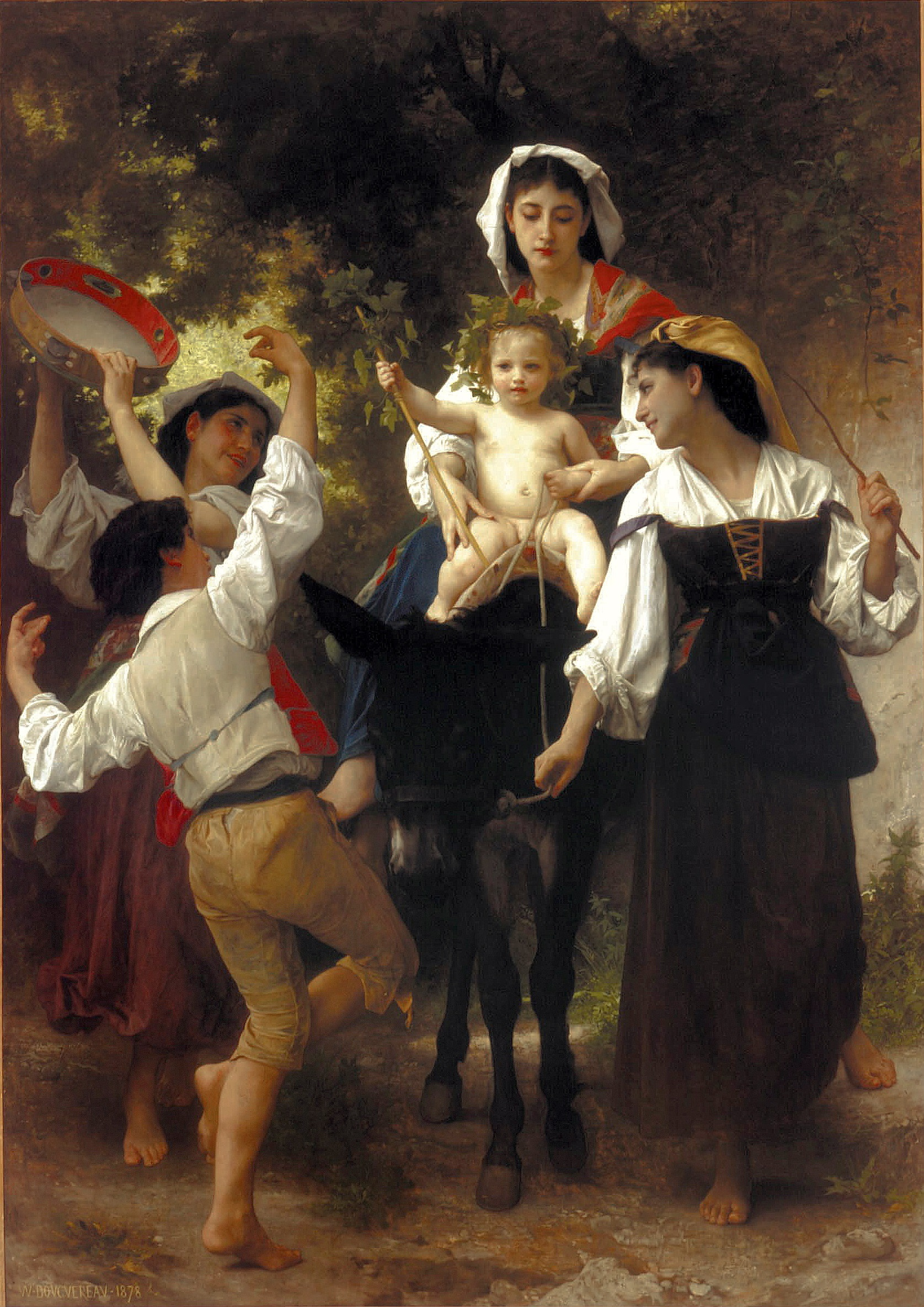
William-Adolphe Bouguereau, Return from the Harvest, c. 1878

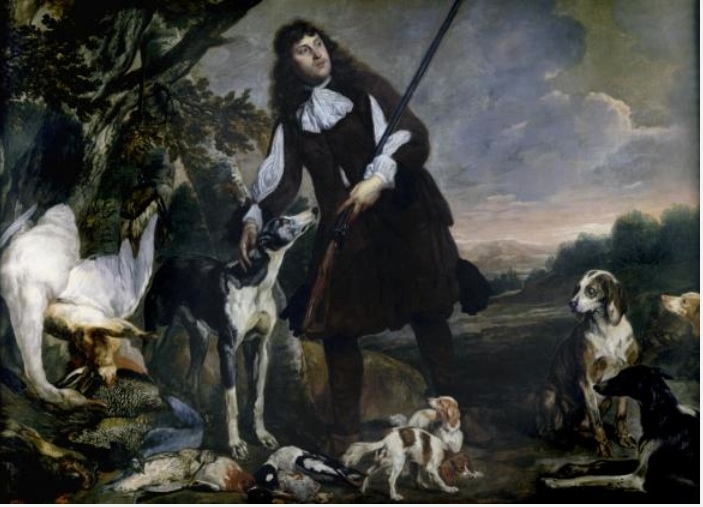
Pieter Thijs and Pieter Boel, Huntsman with His Dogs and Game, c. 1650
