= Adriaen de Grijef =

Dutch painter

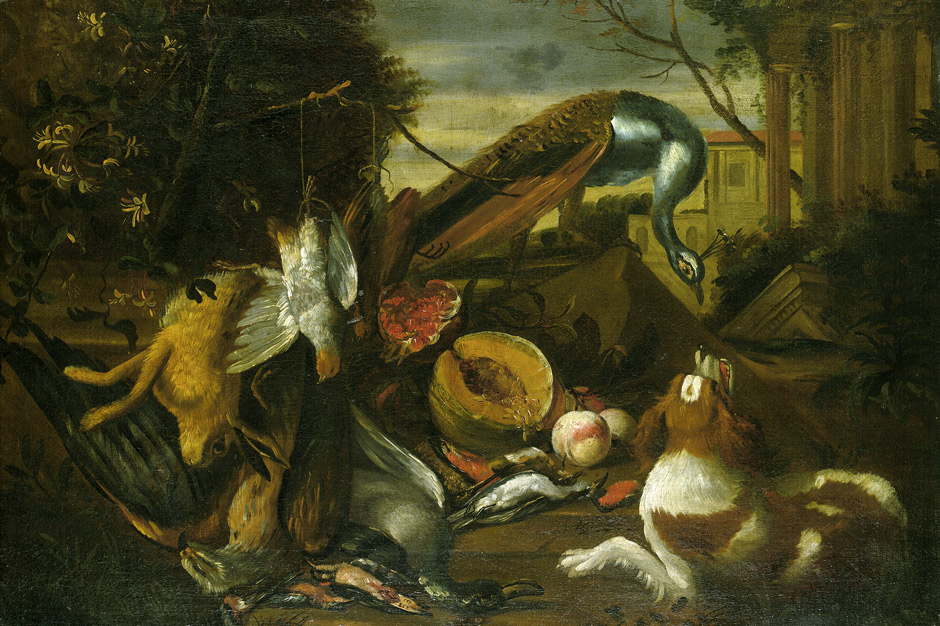
Hunting still life

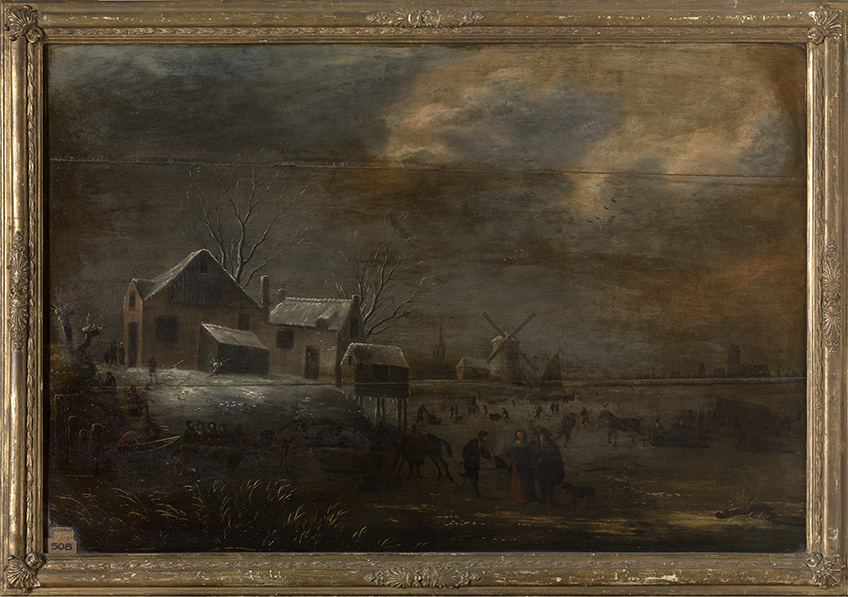
Winter landscape (1640–1659)

Adriaen de Grijef (1657–1722) was an 18th-century painter from the Dutch Republic.

== Gallery ==
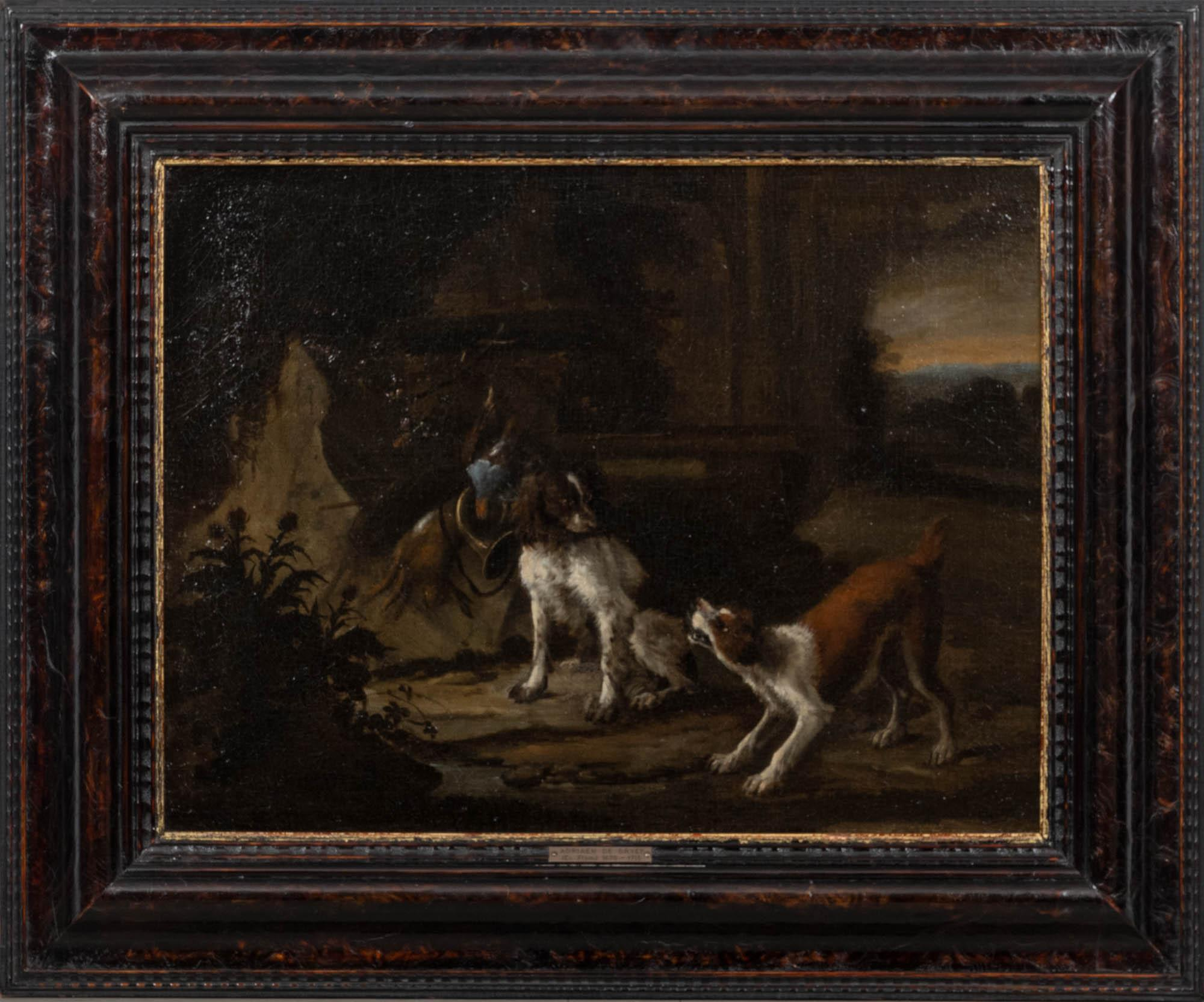
Dogs and Game, c. 1680–1700. Oil on canvas. Formerly in the Bryan Collection, New York; now in the Beatriz de Luna Art Collection, Covilhã, Portugal.

== Biography ==
He was born in Leiden, the son of Jacques de Claeuw. He became a member of the Ghent Guild of St. Luke in 1687, and became a member of the Antwerp guild in 1700. He married in Antwerp and afterward moved to Brussels, where he lived and worked until his death in 1722.
