= Jacques de Claeuw =

Dutch painter

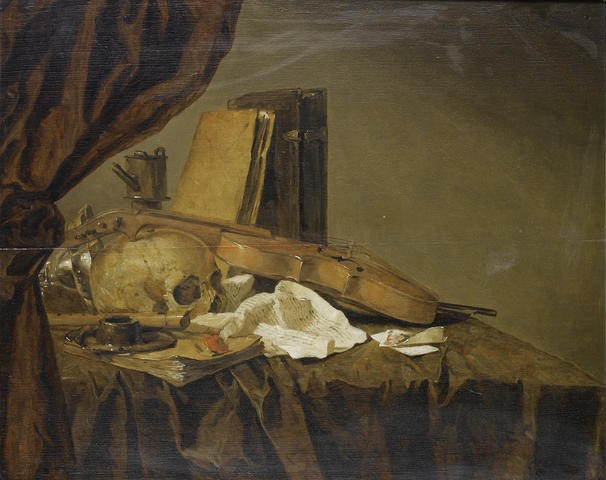
Vanitas

Jacques de Claeuw, or Grieff (May 1623, Dordrecht – 7 November 1694, Leiden), was a Dutch Golden Age painter.

== Biography ==
According to Houbraken, together with Jacob Gerritsz Cuyp, Isaac van Hasselt, and Cornelis Tegelberg, he helped separate the Dordrecht Guild of Saint Luke from the old Gild van de vyf Neringen (guild of five trades) in 1642.

According to the RKD he was a member of the Dordrecht guild in 1642–46, in 1646 he became a member of the guild in the Hague, and in 1651 he married and moved to Leiden where he became the father of Adriaen de Grijef. He is registered also in Haarlem in 1687.
