= Asturian Americans =

Americans of Asturian birth or descent

Asturianu-estauxunidenses (Asturian) Asturiano-estadounidenses (Spanish)

Total population
- 3,274

Regions with significant populations
- Florida, West Virginia, Pennsylvania, Texas, New Mexico, California, Puerto Rico

Languages
- American English, Asturian, Spanish, Eonavian

Religion
- Roman Catholicism

Related ethnic groups
- Asturian people and other groups of the Asturian diaspora, Spanish people

Asturian Americans (Asturian: Asturianu-estauxunidenses, Spanish: Asturiano-estadounidenses) are citizens of the United States who are of Asturian ancestry.

== History ==
=== First Americans ===
The first Asturian immigrants came to North America as soldiers, officers and settlers with the Spanish Army in the wake of Spain's conquest of what is today Florida, Mexico and the southwestern US. Some came directly to areas that would eventually become American territory, while others came to the present-day US via Mexico or Cuba. Saint Augustine, the oldest continuously occupied European-founded city anywhere in the continental United States, was founded by the Asturian Pedro Menéndez de Avilés. His expedition consisted of 2,000 settlers; at least forty of them were Asturians, mostly soldiers and from various areas of Asturias (mainly from Avilés, Ribadesella and Villaviciosa).

The first known child of European descent to be born in what is now the continental US was Martín de Argüelles (Asturian: Martín d'Argüelles), born in 1566 in Saint Augustine to Asturian parents. Several of the first colonial governors of Florida were Asturians, including Menéndez de Avilés, Hernando de Miranda, Rodrigo del Junco, Pedro Menéndez Márquez, Juan Menéndez Márquez and Juan Treviño de Guillamas.

=== Modern immigration ===
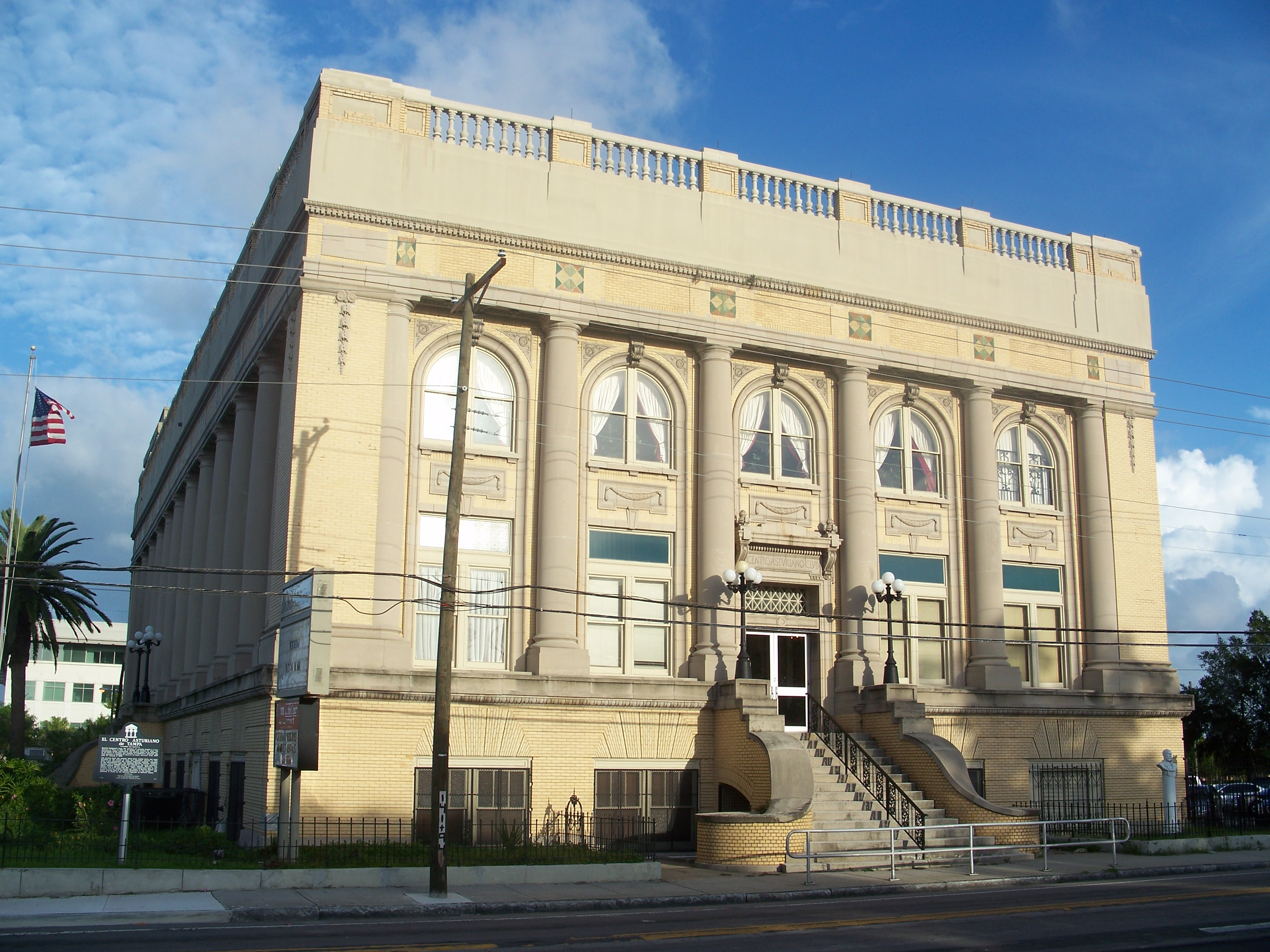
Centro Asturiano de Tampa, Florida

In the early decades of the 20th century, thousands of Asturians left Spain and Cuba and came to work, either in the zinc and coal mines of West Virginia and Pennsylvania, or in the thriving tobacco industry of Tampa, Florida. These Asturian immigrants organized themselves in tight-knit communities, setting up clubs and welfare organizations to provide and care for its members.

One such club is the Centro Asturiano de Tampa, a historic site in Ybor City, Tampa, Florida. It is located at 1913 Nebraska Avenue. Established in 1902, it was added to the National Register of Historic Places on July 24, 1974. It was designed by Tampa architect M. Leo Elliott.

On Asturian immigration, the "Asturian-American Migration Forum" states:

Asturias, a northern Spanish region on the Cantabrian Sea (Bay of Biscay), has been a center of mining and metallurgy for thousands of years. Between 1900 and 1924, thousands of Spaniards emigrated from Asturias to the United States. Many of those immigrating were skilled workers who followed the zinc, coal, and other heavy industry to the New World. Others were led by family ties, a desire to avoid military service, or the promise of adventure.

These Asturian immigrants established an informal but lively network which connected Spain, Cuba, Florida, Indiana, Kansas, Missouri, New York, Ohio, Pennsylvania, West Virginia, California, and other locations within the US.

== 2010 US Census ==
The 2010 US Census failed to include an Asturian category, leaving Asturian-Americans with the only choice of checking the Hispanic category, unlike Basques or Scotch-Irish Americans, who, even though they do not come from independent countries, are recognized by the US Census with their own categories.

== Notable people ==
=== Artists ===
- Mabel Alvarez (November 28, 1891 – March 13, 1985), painter.

=== Entertainment ===
- Gloria Estefan (born September 1, 1957), Cuban-born singer-songwriter, actress and entrepreneur.
- Eva Longoria (born March 15, 1975), actress. Her surname originates from the village of Llongoria, in the municipality of Belmonte de Miranda, Asturias, Spain, from where her paternal ancestors came.
- Frankie Muniz (Francisco Muniz IV, born December 5, 1985), actor, musician, writer, producer and race car driver.
- Paloma Bloyd (born March 6, 1988), actress.
- Jason Molina (December 30, 1973 – March 16, 2013), musician and singer-songwriter. Founder of Songs: Ohia and Magnolia Electric Co.

=== Lawyers, historians and writers ===
- Alfred-Maurice de Zayas (born May 31, 1947), American lawyer, writer, historian, a leading expert in the field of human rights and international law.

=== Military ===
- Baldomero Lopez (August 23, 1925 – September 15, 1950), first lieutenant in the United States Marine Corps during the Korean War.

=== Miscellanea ===
- Martín de Argüelles (1566–1630), first known child of European descent born in what is now the continental US.
- Manuel A. Gonzalez (1832–1902), Asturian-born steamship captain who was one of the first permanent settlers of Fort Myers, Florida.

=== Politicians ===
- Bob Martínez (born December 25, 1934) 40th Governor of Florida from 1987 to 1991 and the mayor of Tampa from 1979 to 1986. Martínez was the first person of Spanish ancestry to be elected to the state's top office.
- Bill Richardson (November 15, 1947 – September 1, 2023), 30th Governor of New Mexico from 2003 to 2011.
- Bob Menendez (born January 1, 1954) senior United States senator from New Jersey.

=== Scientists ===
- Luis F. Alvarez (April 1, 1853 – May 24, 1937), Asturian-born physician and researcher who practiced in both California and Hawaii.
- Walter C. Alvarez (1884 – June 18, 1978), doctor.
- Severo Ochoa (September 24, 1905 – November 1, 1993), Asturian-born doctor and biochemist, joint winner of the 1959 Nobel Prize in Physiology or Medicine with Arthur Kornberg.
- Luis Walter Alvarez (June 13, 1911 – September 1, 1988), experimental physicist and inventor, who spent nearly all of his long professional career on the faculty of the University of California, Berkeley. He was awarded the Nobel Prize in Physics in 1968.
- Walter Alvarez (born October 3, 1940), professor in the Earth and Planetary Science department at the University of California, Berkeley. He is most widely known for the theory that dinosaurs were killed by an asteroid impact, developed in collaboration with his father, Nobel Prize–winning physicist Luis Alvarez.

=== Sports ===
- Lou Piniella (Louis Victor Piniella, born August 28, 1943), former Major League outfielder and manager; nicknamed "Sweet Lou".
- Evan Longoria (born October 7, 1985), Major League Baseball third baseman.
- Al Lopez (August 20, 1908 – 2005), former Major League catcher and manager; Member of the Baseball Hall of Fame; nicknamed "El Señor".

== See also ==
- Spanish people
- Asturians
- Centro Asturiano de Tampa
- History of Ybor City
- Spanish American
  - Basque Americans
  - Catalan American
  - Galician American
  - Canarian American
- Hispanic
- Hispanic Society of America
  - Californio
  - Nuevomexicano (Origins of New Mexico Families: A Genealogy of the Spanish Colonial Period)
  - Tejano
- Floridanos
- Spain–United States relations
