= Rodrigo del Junco =

Spanish soldier

Governor of La Florida
- In office 1592–1592
- Preceded by: Gutierre de Miranda
- Succeeded by: Domingo Martínez de Avendaño

Personal details
- Born: Unknown Ribadesella, Asturias, Spain
- Died: 1592 Off the coast of La Florida
- Profession: Soldier, factor and Overseer of the Royal Estate of Florida and the Governor of Florida

Rodrigo del Junco (born in Ribadesella, Asturias, Spain, died 1592) was a Spanish soldier, a factor (mercantile agent) and Overseer of the Royal Estate in La Florida, and governor of the province in 1592.

== Biography ==
Rodrigo del Junco was baptized in the Roman Catholic church of Santa Maria de Junco in Ribadesella. He had one brother, Juan del Junco. Rodrigo del Junco attained the rank of captain in the Spanish Army and before 1550, served Philip II of Spain as an agent of the Kingdom of Naples, and later became a factor in Florida. He settled in San Agustín as a factor and Overseer of the Royal Estate of La Florida.

In late June 1579, King Philip II of Spain sent one hundred soldiers to Florida to reinforce the province's defenses. Nearly 50 of them drowned when the galleon Santiago el Menor sank near the port of San Augustine. Governor Pedro Menéndez de Márquez sent a request to Rodrigo de Junco for fifty more soldiers to replace the soldiers who had died; Junco complied with his request.

When the presidio's soldiers balked at laboring on construction of a new wooden fort because such work was not, according to them, part of their duties, Rodrigo de Junco asked Philip II to send 30 slaves from Havana for that purpose. Consequently, Philip issued an order for the slaves to be sent to Florida for 4 years. Most of them worked under harsh conditions, and twenty of them were sent to Santa Elena to repair the fort there.

In 1550, Rodrigo del Junco returned to Seville, where on 16 March he was granted, before the notary Diego de la Barrera, a new fiduciary power to take effect in Florida. On February 7, 1587, he was given, along with his wife, permission before the clerk Martin Calvo de la Puerta to sell some houses that they owned in Seville. About 1590 Rodrigo del Junco returned with his family to Florida, where, according to Francisco Xavier de Santa Cruz y Mallén in his Historia de familias cubanas, he was appointed governor in 1592, but died the same year in a shipwreck off the coast of Florida.

Rodrigo del Junco was the second husband of Francisca de Miranda Santo Domingo. They had at least two children, Bartolomeo del Junco y Miranda and Maria del Junco-Miranda.
