= Hernando de Miranda =

Spanish conquistador and explorer (died 1593)

2nd Governor of La Florida
- In office 24 February 1576 – 5 September 1577
- Preceded by: Diego de Velasco
- Succeeded by: Gutierre de Miranda

Personal details
- Born: San Tirso, Candamo, Asturias, Spain
- Died: 1593 Havana, Cuba
- Spouse: Catalina Menéndez de Avilés
- Profession: Conqueror and explorer

Hernando de Miranda (died 1593) was a Spanish conquistador and explorer who was governor of Spanish Florida from 1575 to 1577. He took office after the death of the first governor of the province, Pedro Menéndez de Avilés. He was the brother-in-law of the subsequent governor, Pedro Menéndez de Márquez, and the brother of Gutierre de Miranda, who would also become governor.

== Early years ==
Hernando de Miranda was born in San Tirso, a parish of Candamo (Asturias, Spain). He was the son of Sancho de Miranda and Leonor de las Alas. As a young man, he joined the Spanish Navy, where he excelled, reaching the rank of general.

He was a friend of Menéndez de Avilés, the former governor, who accompanied him on several trips to the Americas. When the Adelantado began the conquest and colonization of Florida in 1565, Miranda joined his staff.

While the peninsula of Florida and neighboring regions were explored and conquered, Miranda was directed to stay in the capital of the colony, St. Augustine. Then, in 1566, the Adelantado selected Miranda to accompany him in pursuit of pirates in the Caribbean.

== Governorship ==
When Miranda arrived in Florida, he began working to eliminate corruption. He found that former Governor Diego de Velasco had appropriated large sums of money from Menéndez de Avilés, claiming that Menéndez de Avilés had owed him money at the time of his death. Miranda imprisoned Velasco and replaced him in the government of Santa Elena with one of his lieutenants, Alonso Solís. Velasco's treasurer, Bertolomeo Martinez, supported the allegations against him. However, Martinez was himself briefly imprisoned, as Miranda suspected that he had been complicit in Velasco's crimes.

Miranda held the Florida governorship until 1577, when a group of native Floridians rebelled and murdered several soldiers at the fort of Santa Elena, where Miranda had arrived in February 1576.

== Personal life ==
Miranda's friendship with Avilés was reflected in his marriage to Menéndez de Avilés's eldest daughter, Catalina Menéndez de Avilés, with whom he had a daughter named Toribia.

Miranda died in 1593.
