= Llongoria =

- hamlet
- Location within Spain
- Coordinates: 43°21′7.434″N 6°11′20.746″W
- Country: Spain
- Autonomous community: Asturias
- Province: Asturias
- Municipality: Miranda
- Elevation: 94 m (308 ft)

Population (2019)
  - Total: 25

Llongoria is a hamlet in Samartín de Llodón, a parish in the municipality of Belmonte de Miranda, within the province and autonomous community of Asturias, in northern Spain. It is known as the birthplace of actress Eva Longoria's paternal ancestors.

== Geography ==
Llongoria is situated on the slopes of the Sierra del Pedroriu, where its traditional hamlet is distributed on both sides of the former alignment of the AS-15 road, the historic route connecting Corniana with Balmonte and Cangas del Narcea. The hamlet lies approximately 12 km from the municipal capital, Balmonte.

The area forms part of the lands known as the "Ría Miranda", a fertile valley shaped by the Narcea River as it flows through the municipality. This setting gives rise to productive vegas and a characteristic rural landscape combining small pastures, mixed woodland, and scattered traditional Asturian rural architecture. Llongoria stands at an elevation of around 94 metres above sea level within this low-lying and humid terrain, typical of central-western Asturias.

== Economy ==
The local economy is predominantly rural. Small-scale cattle raising, subsistence farming, and maintenance of traditional orchards remain common activities among residents. The surrounding forests support the gathering of firewood and seasonal products, while the proximity to natural areas contributes modestly to rural tourism within the municipality.

== Access ==
Llongoria is located along the old route of the AS-15 road, although modern traffic now bypasses the hamlet through the newer alignment. Local rural roads connect it with the other settlements of the parish of Samartín de Llodón and with the municipal centre of Belmonte de Miranda. There is no public transport to the hamlet, and access is primarily by private vehicle.

== Culture ==
Llongoria forms part of the cultural heritage of Samartín de Llodón parish, where traditional Asturian architecture—such as stone houses, wooden balconies, and horros and paneres—remains present. Local festivities are generally shared with neighbouring villages of the parish, reflecting strong community ties and preservation of customs such as traditional gastronomy and Asturian-language toponymy.

== Heritage ==
In Llongoria stands the Palaciu de Llongoria, a manor house originating in the 17th century and remodelled in later periods. The building is privately owned and historically associated with the Longoria lineage, whose coat of arms is displayed on the main façade.

From this ancestral home, several members of the family emigrated to the Americas in the early 17th century, a movement consistent with wider Asturian diaspora of the period. The hamlet is regarded as the point of origin of the branch from which actress Eva Longoria descends. According to El Comercio, Longoria visited the hamlet in 2017 while tracing her genealogical roots, which local tradition links to Alonso Longoria de La Pontiga, who left the area for the Viceroyalty of New Spain (present-day Mexico). During her visit, she expressed appreciation for the site’s ancestral connection and took a photograph with the locality’s entrance sign.

== Demographics ==
It had a population of 25 inhabitants in 2019.
