= Alfonso Fernando Gonzalez =

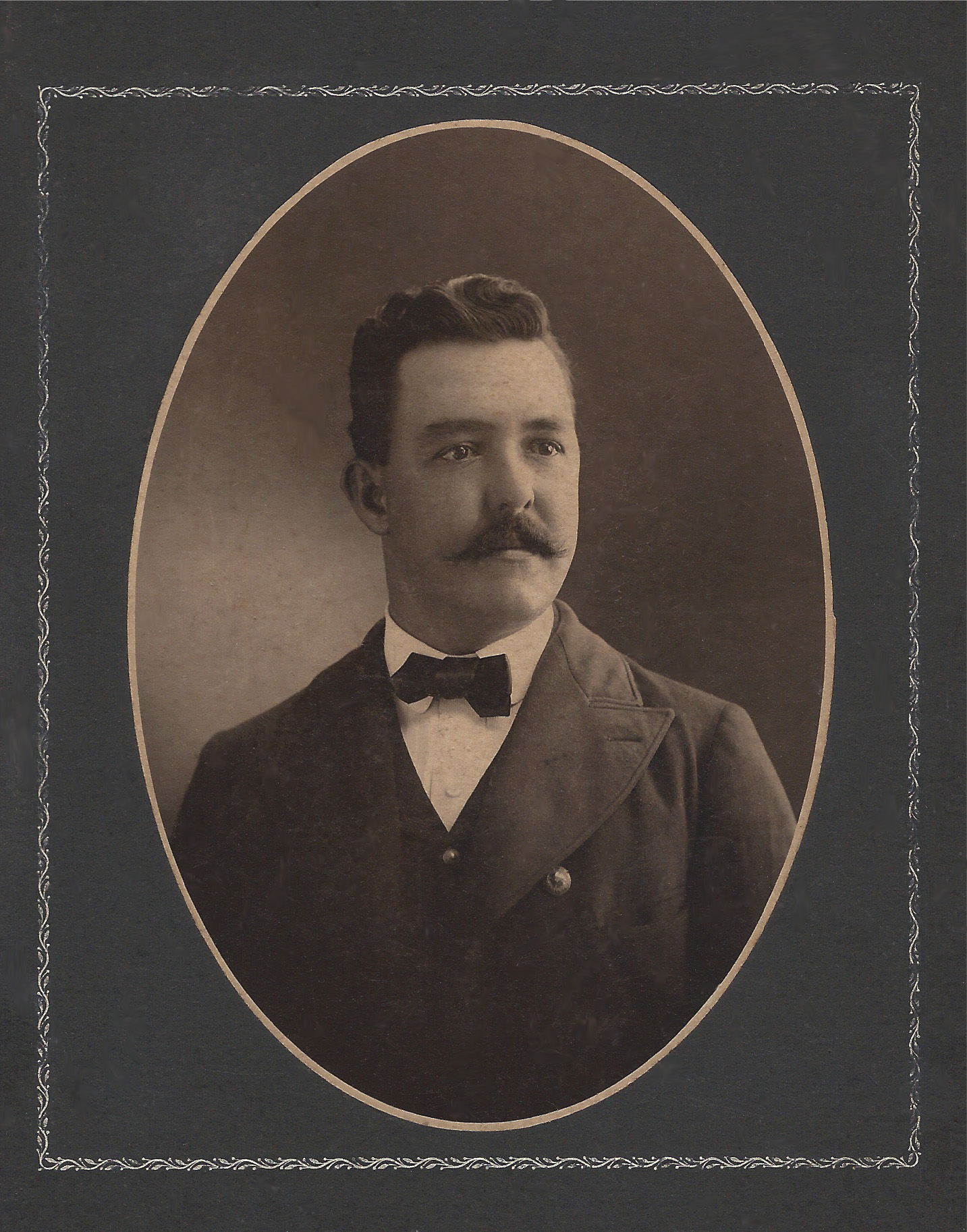
- Born: December 24, 1874; Fort Myers, Florida
- Died: July 9, 1961 (aged 86); Daytona Beach, Florida

Alfonso Fernando Gonzalez (December 25, 1874 – July 9, 1961) was a Florida Pioneer, Explorer and Steamship Captain, best known for his participation in an 1893 expedition through the Florida Everglades. Gonzalez was a son of Captain Manuel A. Gonzalez, who founded the City of Ft. Myers, Florida in 1866,

== 1893 Everglades Expedition from Fort Myers to Palm Beach, Florida ==
On September 1, 1893 Alfonso Fernando Gonzalez, William G. Rew, L. C. Stewart and Joe Henley departed Fort Myers, Florida in two dugout canoes purchased from local Seminole Indians. The team planned to go through Caloosahatchee river, Lake Flirt, Lake Hicpochee and Lake Okeechobee, then through the Everglades to the east coast of Florida where Henry Flagler was building the Royal Poinciana Hotel. The trip which was expected to take four days ended up taking fifteen days when the harsh conditions in the Everglades for the last 40 miles of the trek nearly cost the men their lives. In the most difficult parts of the journey the men had to abandon their dugout canoes and slog through the Everglades on foot, traveling barely a mile every five hours. After the men ran out of food they were forced to survive by eating palmetto cabbage.

On the fourteenth day of the journey, Gonzalez, Rew, Stewart and Henley reached dry ground on the eastern edge of the Everglades where they came upon two men hewing pine timbers for railroad ties for Henry Flagler’s East Coast Railroad. The two men fled when they saw the ragged four survivors of the expedition, but Gonzalez and the others followed them and were ultimately led to the work camp commissary where they recovered from the journey.
