= Gutierre de Miranda =

Colonial governor of Florida (fl. 1570s)

4th Governor of La Florida
- In office 5 September 1576 – 1577
- Preceded by: Hernando de Miranda
- Succeeded by: Rodrigo del Junco and Pedro Menéndez de Márquez

Personal details
- Born: Unknown
- Profession: Captain and governor

Gutierre de Miranda was interim governor of Spanish Florida in the late 16th century. He was a brother of the previous governor of Spanish Florida, Hernando de Miranda, and brother-in-law of the next governor, Pedro Menéndez Márquez.

== Political career ==
On 5 September 1576,), Miranda was appointed interim governor of Spanish Florida. During his tenure, the economy was weak, citizens faced food shortages, and there were Native American revolts against the Spanish settlers. Miranda left the governor's office in 1577 and was replaced by Márquez, his brother-in-law. King Philip II then appointed him captain and governor of the new Fort San Marcos in Santa Elena.

After Miranda proposed to a married woman and she refused him, he attempted to destroy the woman's marriage of ten years, falsely accusing her husband of abusing her. The husband was jailed after Miranda presented false documents against him.

Miranda was married to Mariana Manrique.
