= Pedro Menéndez Márquez =

Spanish military officer, conquistador and governor

3rd Governor of La Florida
- In office 1577 – 9 July 1594
- Lieutenant: Vicente González and Tomás Bernaldo de Quirós
- Preceded by: Gutierre de Miranda
- Succeeded by: Domingo Martínez de Avendaño

Personal details
- Born: c.1537 Asturias, Spain
- Died: 1600 Florida
- Spouse: María de Miranda
- Profession: explorer, conquistador and governor

Pedro Menéndez Márquez (c.1537 – 1600) was a Spanish military officer, conquistador, and governor of Spanish Florida. He was a nephew of Pedro Menéndez de Avilés, who had been appointed adelantado (an elite military and administrative position) of La Florida by King Philip II. Márquez was also related to Diego de Velasco, Hernando de Miranda, Gutierre de Miranda, Juan Menéndez Márquez, and Francisco Menéndez Márquez, all of whom served as governors of La Florida.

== Early career ==
Pedro Menéndez Márquez was the son of Marquis Alonso ("El Mozo") and Maria Alonso Arango ("La Moza"). He had four siblings: Alonso, Juan, Catalina and Elvira Menéndez Marqués. Márquez began serving with his uncle Pedro Menéndez de Avilés in about 1548, occasionally as master of ships under his uncle's command. As Pedro Menéndez de Avilés was preparing his expedition to found a colony in Florida, he appointed Márquez as second-in-command of the fleet sailing from Asturias. After the founding of St. Augustine and the expulsion of the French from Fort Caroline, Márquez was dispatched to carry the official report to Spain, in command of the ships returning there for supplies. Although Márquez was not the first to bring news of Menéndez de Avilés' success to King Phillip II, the king nevertheless awarded him 300 gold ducats. Márquez then loaded supplies for the new colony and sailed for Florida, but other ships in Menéndez de Avilés' fleet were prevented from leaving Spain.

== Governor of Cuba and Florida ==
For a brief period around 1571, Menéndez Marquéz served as lieutenant governor of Cuba under Menéndez de Avilés, who was then governor of Cuba, but usually absent from the island. In 1573, he explored the Atlantic coast as far north as Chesapeake Bay. In 1575, he brought nine Franciscan friars to Florida, the first in the colony

In 1577, Philip II appointed Pedro Menéndez Márquez as governor of La Florida. In October 1577, Márquez replaced Hernando de Miranda as governor of Santa Elena, located on what is now called Parris Island in Port Royal Sound, and reoccupied the settlement with a military force under his command. Márquez, anticipating that the Indians might attack any Spaniards who tried to return to Santa Elena, brought a prefabricated fort from St. Augustine and with 53 men erected it in just six days.

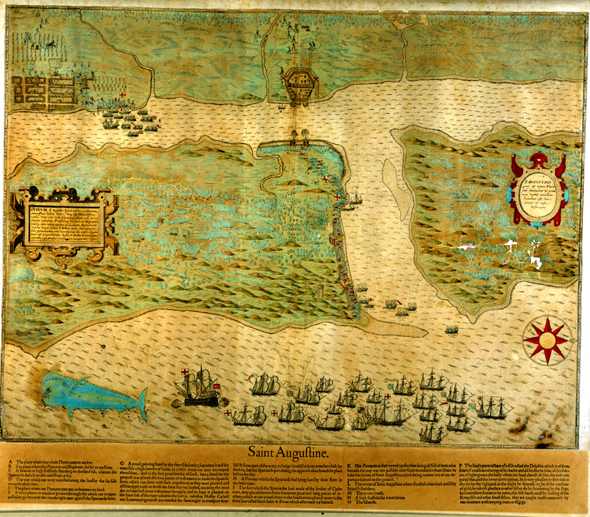
Map depicting Sir Francis Drake's 1586 attack on St. Augustine

Menéndez Márquez successfully suppressed a rebellion of the Guale Indians provoked by his predecessor and restored or strengthened the Spanish outposts. He also had to deal with new French attempts to establish themselves along the coast north of Santa Elena, English raiding in the Caribbean, and the establishment of an English colony at Roanoke. When Sir Francis Drake attacked and burned St. Augustine and its fort on June 6–8, 1586 Marquéz had already ordered the evacuation of the city after a ship brought news from Hispaniola that Drake was in the Caribbean. These factors combined with the failure to find the English colony at Roanoke caused Márquez to abandon the Spanish colony at Santa Elena and concentrate on reinforcing and rebuilding St. Augustine. Márquez ordered his soldiers to build a new wooden fort to defend the city, and brought the settlers of the failed colony to the capital of La Florida.

In 1580, Márquez discovered coquina, a sedimentary rock composed mostly of the ancient shells of small mollusks and later used in many buildings in St. Augustine, on Anastasia Island. In 1587, he returned to Santa Elena and ordered his soldiers to destroy what remained of the Spanish infrastructure and the second Fort San Marcos.

Although by 1589 Márquez knew that the English colony at Roanoke was gone, he planned on establishing a Spanish outpost on Chesapeake Bay to block future English settlements in the area. Instead, he was appointed to organize the treasure fleets in Havana, and did not return to Florida.

== Personal life ==
Pedro Menéndez Márquez married María de Miranda, according to the will of Pedro Menéndez de Avilés.

Márquez arranged for his nephew, Juan Menéndez Márquez, to marry his niece, María Menéndez de Posada. Juan became the royal treasurer for Spanish Florida, and the couple's descendants remained prominent in official and economic affairs there for more than a century.

According to Márquez, when he governed Florida he got half his salary through the situado (the Spanish Crown's royal subsidy of the colony) and the other half from the fruit he grew and sold. According to Domingo González de León, however, Marquez used the excuse that he got money from selling fruit to take money from the treasury whenever he wanted. Márquez and his nephew also were reported to have behaved strangely and improperly with the town's women, reportedly driving married women from their homes and forcing them to participate in mock military musters, as well as taking other women on picnics to a deserted island, and using them as they wished.
