= Tomás Bernaldo de Quirós =

Governor of Santa Elena, Florida
- In office 1577 – November 1580

Personal details
- Born: Unknown
- Died: Unknown
- Profession: Sailor and administrator (governor of Santa Elena and Florida)

Tomás Bernaldo de Quirós, also known as Thomas Bernaldo de Quiros, was a sailor who served as governor of Florida between 1578 and 1579. He was also acting governor of Santa Elena from 1577 to November 1580, at least.

== Biography ==
Quirós was a sailor in several fleets traveling to Spanish America over many years. In 1577, Quirós was appointed Lieutenant Governor of Santa Elena by Pedro Menéndez de Márquez, governor of Florida. He arrived at the city on September 4, 1578, and he ruled it in an interim way, in service to Menéndez de Márquez. He ruled Santa Elena with Captain Vicente González. According to an account of the achievements of Quirós, while he worked as lieutenant governor, he signed peace treaties with the leaders of the indigenous people of the city and he tried to create a "pueblo formado" (formed town) there. During his administration, he also built a church in Saint Elena.

Marquez initially sent Quirós north of Florida to establish friendship with the caciques of the indigenous peoples of the area, as well as to ransom a Frenchman and a Black man (both of them captured by the Guale people). To do this, he was asked to negotiate with the chief Cazacolo and convince four of the most important Guales to visit Saint Augustine, the Florida capital. In Saint Augustine, Quirós would make them prisoners and give them gifts and then be asked to surrender the Frenchman. In addition, Quirós was asked to find a half dozen Native American women in Saint Augustine who gathered oysters. Between December 1579 and July 1580, he negotiated peace treaties with 15 caciques of different Native American peoples, achieving peace with many tribes.

The "formed town" construction was revered by Menéndez de Márquez who, on March 25, 1580, indicated that these villages were being well built and the houses of the indigenous seemed fortified, being constructed of mud and wood. More than sixty houses were built, whereas prior to the arrival of Quirós, the town only had a fort and one house, as a notary told Marquez, so most of Santa Elena's inhabitants likely lived in temporary dwellings, such as tents. During his administration, he also built a new church in Santa Elena.

In addition, Quirós, Menendez de Marquez, and the Governor of Castillo de San Marcos, Gutierre de Miranda, attacked and defeated several indigenous people who had participated in the destruction of Santa Elena. Quirós left his position of lieutenant of Santa Elena in November 1580.

On November 22, 1578, Quirós was appointed governor of Florida, holding this office until 1579.
