= Diego de Velasco =

Royal Governor of La Florida (in office 1574–1576)

Diego Fernandez de Velasco

2nd Governor of La Florida
- In office September 17, 1574 – February 24, 1576
- Preceded by: Pedro Menéndez de Avilés
- Succeeded by: Hernando de Miranda

Personal details
- Born: 1500
- Died: before 1595 Mexico City, Viceroyalty of New Spain
- Spouse: Maria Menendez de Aviles
- Profession: Military official and Governor of Florida (1574 - 1576)

Diego Fernandez de Velasco (?? - 1595) was a career soldier who served as interim Lieutenant Governor of Spanish Florida between 1574 and 1576 as well as Governor of Nueva Vizcaya, Corregidor of Zacatecas, and Alguacil Mayor of Mexico City. His administration ended with his and his treasurer Bertolomeo Martinez's imprisonment by his successor as governor, Hernando de Miranda, following investigations of corruption in his administration, as well as crimes committed against Native Americans and the Spanish settlers of Florida.

== Biography ==
De Velasco was the son-in-law of the first governor of Florida, Pedro Menéndez de Aviles. He joined the Spanish army in his youth, achieving the rank of lieutenant.

In 1571, Velasco oversaw the construction of Fort San Felipe on what is now Parris Island, South Carolina, a defensive structure built to protect the Spanish settlers of La Florida after a raid by French settlers and Native Americans allied with them.

On September 17, 1574, after his father had become a general in the Nueva Armada Real (New Royal Army), Velasco was appointed temporary Governor of Florida, although this was an interim appointment made upon the death of Menéndez. The colony's capital was the recently founded settlement of Santa Elena in what is now South Carolina.

The cacique of Guale told Alonso de Olmos that the Spaniards "had made him a Christian", but only to enslave him and steal his property. Apparently Velasco and Captain Alonso de Solis had taken several brazas (a braza was a Spanish unit of length equal to the reach of outspread arms) of pearls, the native medium of exchange, worth two gold ducats each, as well as several canoes, from the Indians without payment. Velasco denied he had forced the Indians to pay him personal tribute, and said that in fact, he and the Indians had exchanged gifts, and that the Indians had thus obtained Spanish products such as iron farming implements, blankets and clothes. Velasco said that he had established a friendship with the cacique, who had fallen ill on a visit to Santa Elena, and treated him with costly medicines until he recovered. Velasco also maintained that he had given the chief and his wife other gifts, such as clothes, and that in appreciation, they had given him a braza of black pearls, but of low value.

According to the written testimony of Father Oré in 1576, Velasco, after asking the caciques of Guale to gather in Santa Elena, and indicating that he would not do them any harm, hanged one of them (the nephew of a cacique) as punishment for killing a Christian Indian chieftain, to fulfill a promise he had made to the wife of another chief who had converted to Christianity, she seeking vengeance for the murder of her husband, and demanding retribution. These events led to a widespread Guale rebellion and violence against the Spanish of La Florida. (Note: These events caused a rebellion in Guale in 1597.)

Thirty soldiers who fought against the natives in defense of Santa Elena were killed, causing the town to be temporarily abandoned in the late summer of 1576 and then to be burned later by the Indians, in full view of the soldiers and settlers as they were about to sail away from Port Royal Sound.

Velasco was also accused of mishandling the provincial soldiers' pay, and consequently was replaced by Hernando de Miranda as governor of La Florida in 1575.

== Last years ==
When Miranda came to La Florida in 1575, before assuming his position as governor, he began working to abolish corruption in the Spanish province, and found that Velasco had appropriated large sums of money from Menéndez, with the excuse that the money officially belonged to him after the adelantado's death. Miranda imprisoned him and replaced him with one of his lieutenants, Alonso de Solis, at Santa Elena. Velasco and his treasurer, Bertolomeo Martinez, were briefly imprisoned for their suspected complicity in governmental misfeasance and the misappropriation of Menéndez's funds. As a result of this, Velasco was sentenced to 3 years of exile from the Americas and 2 years of suspension from office. On February 24, 1576, Hernando de Miranda began his term as governor of La Florida.

It is not known when Velasco died. The last known mention of Velasco being alive was in 1579, when a petition to lift his suspension from office was submitted to the Council of the Indies, and later approved.

== Personal life ==
Velasco married Menéndez's younger daughter, Maria Menéndez de Avilés.
