= Vicente González (governor) =

Governor of Spanish Florida

- Born: Unknown
- Died: Unknown
- Military career
- Rank: Governor

Vicente González (? - ?) was governor of Florida between November 22, 1577, and 1578. He was also governor of Santa Elena, la Florida, from, at least, 1577 to 1580.

Vicente González and Captain Tomás Bernaldo de Quirós were appointment lieutenants of Pedro Menéndez de Márquez in Santa Elena in 1577. He served in this charge until 1580. On November 22, 1577, González was appointment governor of Florida and holded office until 1578. In 1586 Gonzalez led a mission to a legendary strait located "beyond" Florida. The mission was organized for Menéndez de Márquez. During the trip several villages were established and Gonzalez meet a local cacique who confirmed him the existence of the strait. In October 1586 Gonzalez told to the Council of the Indies that near St. Augustine, Florida had a port located next to a fertile land, which had gold and diamond mines and was densely populated by indigenous. The Council decided that this land should be studied and Spanish shipwreck victims to settle there. In the 1580s Vicente González led several voyages into the Chesapeake Bay in search of English settlements in the area.
