= Death ray =

Theoretical weapon

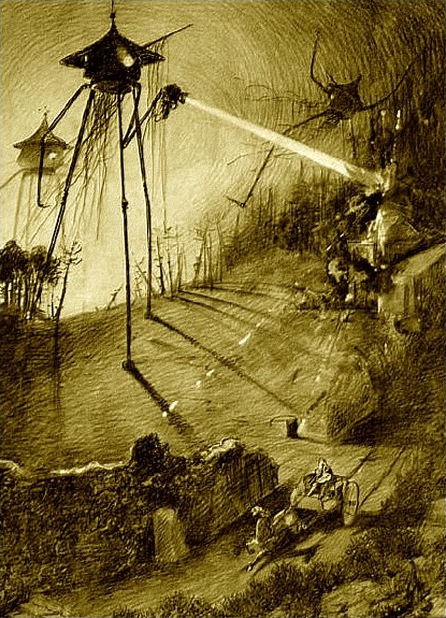
A Martian tripod firing its deadly heat ray, from H G Wells' The War of the Worlds

The death ray or death beam is a theoretical particle beam or electromagnetic weapon first theorized around the 1920s and 1930s. Around that time, inventors such as Guglielmo Marconi, Nikola Tesla, Harry Grindell Matthews, Edwin R. Scott, Erich Graichen and others claimed to have invented it independently. In 1957, the National Inventors Council was still issuing lists of needed military inventions that included a death ray.

While based in fiction, research into energy-based weapons inspired by past speculation has contributed to actual weapons used by modern militaries sometimes called a sort of "death ray", such as the United States Navy and its Laser Weapon System (LaWS) deployed in mid-2014. Such armaments are technically known as directed-energy weapons.

== History ==
In 1923, Edwin R. Scott, an inventor from San Francisco, claimed he was the first to develop a death ray that would destroy human life and bring down planes at a distance. He was born in Detroit, and he claimed he worked for nine years as a student and protégé of Charles P. Steinmetz. Harry Grindell-Matthews tried to sell what he reported to be a death ray to the British Air Ministry in 1924. He was never able to show a functioning model or demonstrate it to the military.

Nikola Tesla claimed to have invented a "death beam" which he called teleforce in the 1930s and continued the claims up until his death. Tesla explained that "this invention of mine does not contemplate the use of any so-called 'death rays'. Rays are not applicable because they cannot be produced in requisite quantities and diminish rapidly in intensity with distance. All the energy of New York City (approximately two million horsepower) transformed into rays and projected twenty miles, could not kill a human being, because, according to a well known law of physics, it would disperse to such an extent as to be ineffectual. My apparatus projects particles which may be relatively large or of microscopic dimensions, enabling us to convey to a small area at a great distance trillions of times more energy than is possible with rays of any kind. Many thousands of horsepower can thus be transmitted by a stream thinner than a hair, so that nothing can resist." Tesla proposed that a nation could "destroy anything approaching within 200 miles... [and] will provide a wall of power" in order to "make any country, large or small, impregnable against armies, airplanes, and other means for attack". He claimed to have worked on the project since about 1900, and said that it drew power from the ionosphere, which he called "an invisible ball of energy surrounding Earth". He said that he had done this with the help of a 50-foot Tesla coil. The "well known law of physics" Tesla mentions refers to the inverse-square law which explains why the rays he mentions decrease in intensity the further they propagate and how their use would be a limitation on the efficacy of such a devastating device.

In 1934, Antonio Longoria claimed to have a death ray that could kill pigeons from four miles away and could kill a mouse enclosed in a "thick walled metal chamber".

During World War II, the Germans had at least two projects, and the Japanese one, to create so-called death rays. One German project led by Ernst Schiebold concerned a particle accelerator with a steerable bundle of beryllium rods running through the vertical axis. The other was developed by Rolf Widerøe and is referred to in his biography. The machine developed by Widerøe was in the Dresden Plasma Physics laboratory in February 1945 when the city was bombed. Widerøe led a team in March 1945 to remove the device from the ruined laboratory and deliver it to General Patton's 3rd Army at Burggrub where it was taken into US custody on 14 April 1945. The Japanese weapon was called Death ray "Ku-Go" which aimed to employ microwaves created in a large magnetron.

== In science fiction ==
The concept of a death ray has been featured in science fiction stories at least as early as 1898's The War of the Worlds by H. G. Wells, and Aleksey Nikolayevich Tolstoy's 1927 novel The Garin Death Ray. Later, science fiction introduced the concept of the handheld raygun used by fictional characters such as Flash Gordon. In Alfred Noyes' 1940 novel The Last Man (US title: No Other Man), a death ray developed by a German scientist named Mardok is unleashed in a global war and almost wipes out the human race. Similar weapons are found in spy-fi films such as Murderers' Row and George Lucas's science-fiction saga Star Wars.

== See also ==
- Archimedes' heat ray
- Havana syndrome
- Heat-Ray
- Sonic weapon
- Sun gun
- Weapons in science fiction
