= Martín de Argüelles =

First white child born in the contiguous U.S.

- Born: 1566; San Agustín, Viceroyalty of New Spain (now in Florida, United States)
- Died: 1630 (aged 63–64); St. Augustine, Florida
- Occupation: Sailor
- Parent(s): Martín de Argüelles Sr., Leonor Morales

Martín de Argüelles Jr. (1566–1630) was the first white child known to have been born in what is now the contiguous United States. His birthplace of St. Augustine, Florida (Spanish: San Agustín, La Florida) is the oldest continuously occupied, European-founded city in the United States.

== Birth ==
Argüelles was born in 1566 in the Spanish settlement of San Agustín, Spanish Florida. Martín's parents were Martín de Argüelles (Sr.) and Leonor Morales. The family of Argüelles was of spaniards.

Argüelles' father, Martín Argüelles Sr., an Asturian hidalgo, was one of the expeditioners who came to New Spain in the New World with Captain General Pedro Menéndez de Avilés in 1565. Argüelles Sr. was the first Alcalde (Mayor) of San Agustín, and had been in charge of munitions in the Florida forts of Santa María, San Agustín (now St. Augustine), and Santa Elena.

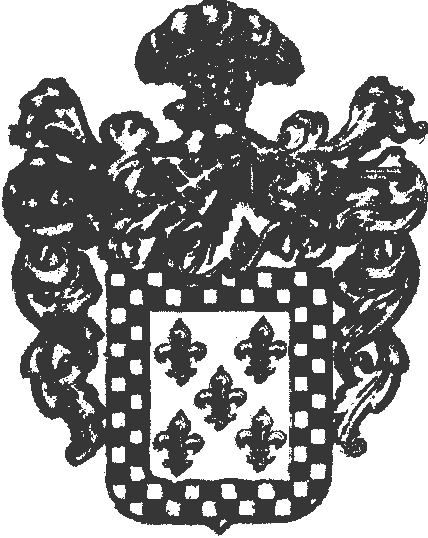
Coat of Arms for the Argüelles family.

== Lifetime ==
Martín Argüelles Jr. served the Spanish crown in Portugal and several garrisons and expeditions which embarked in the Spanish Armada which went in search of corsair Francis Drake. He was later transferred in 1594 from Havana, Cuba, to Mérida, Mexico, where he was appointed Executive Officer of the Mérida fortress and coast. Argüelles was married in Mérida.

== See also ==
- Hélène Desportes – often cited as the first white child born in Canada, New France.
- Virginia Dare – first child of English parentage born in what is now US territory.
