= Longoria =

- Language: Spanish, Italian

Origin
- Origin: Asturian and Piedmont, Italy
- Region of origin: Asturias, Spain

Longoria is an Italian and Spanish surname. The surname “Longoria” originated in the province of Asturias in northwestern Spain, is found in the Basque region of Spain and also in Italy.

== People ==
Notable people with the surname include:

- Álvaro Longoria, Spanish director
- David Longoria, American trumpeter
- Eva Longoria, American actress
- Evan Longoria, American baseball player
- Felix Z. Longoria Jr., American soldier
- Sam Longoria, American filmmaker
- Paola Longoria, Mexican athlete
- Antonio Longoria, American inventor

== See also ==
- The Palace of Longoria, (Spanish: Palacio Longoria) palace located in Madrid, Spain
