= Alonso de Solís =

Soldier and explorer (died 1576)

Alonso de Solís (? - 1576) was a soldier and explorer who served as governor of Florida between April and July 4, 1576, when he was killed. He also participated in the Narváez expedition as royal inspector of mines.

Solís joined the Castilian army in his youth, where he excelled and he reached the rank of official. On June 17, 1527, he participated, together with six hundred other men (among them Álvar Núñez Cabeza de Vaca), in the Narváez expedition, led by Pánfilo de Narváez, to conquer the provinces located between Rio de Palmas and Cape Florida. He served in the expedition as royal inspector of mines. Apparently, in 1574 De Solis and the governor of Florida Diego de Velasco took several fathoms of money to the Amerindians of Florida, who had a value equal to two ducats each, and also two canoes of the natives, without giving them any compensation.

Solís was appointed governor of Florida in April 1576, and was killed less than three months later on July 4, 1576.
