= Antonio Longoria =

American fringe physicist

Antonio Longoria (August 14, 1890 - December 31, 1970) was a scientist who claimed to have invented a death ray in the 1930s.

== Biography ==
Longoria was born in Madrid, Spain, on August 14, 1890. Longoria received a degree in engineering and a Ph.D. in medicine. In 1911, Longoria emigrated to the United States. Longoria moved to Cleveland, Ohio, where he married and had three children. Longoria became the president of the Sterling Electrical Company. Longoria became a naturalized US citizen on December 29, 1919. Longoria claimed in 1936 that patents for his process for welding ferrous and nonferrous metals by his "invisible ray" were sold for $6,000,000. Longoria died on New Year's Eve, December 31, 1970, in Winter Park, Florida.
