= Manuel A. Gonzalez =

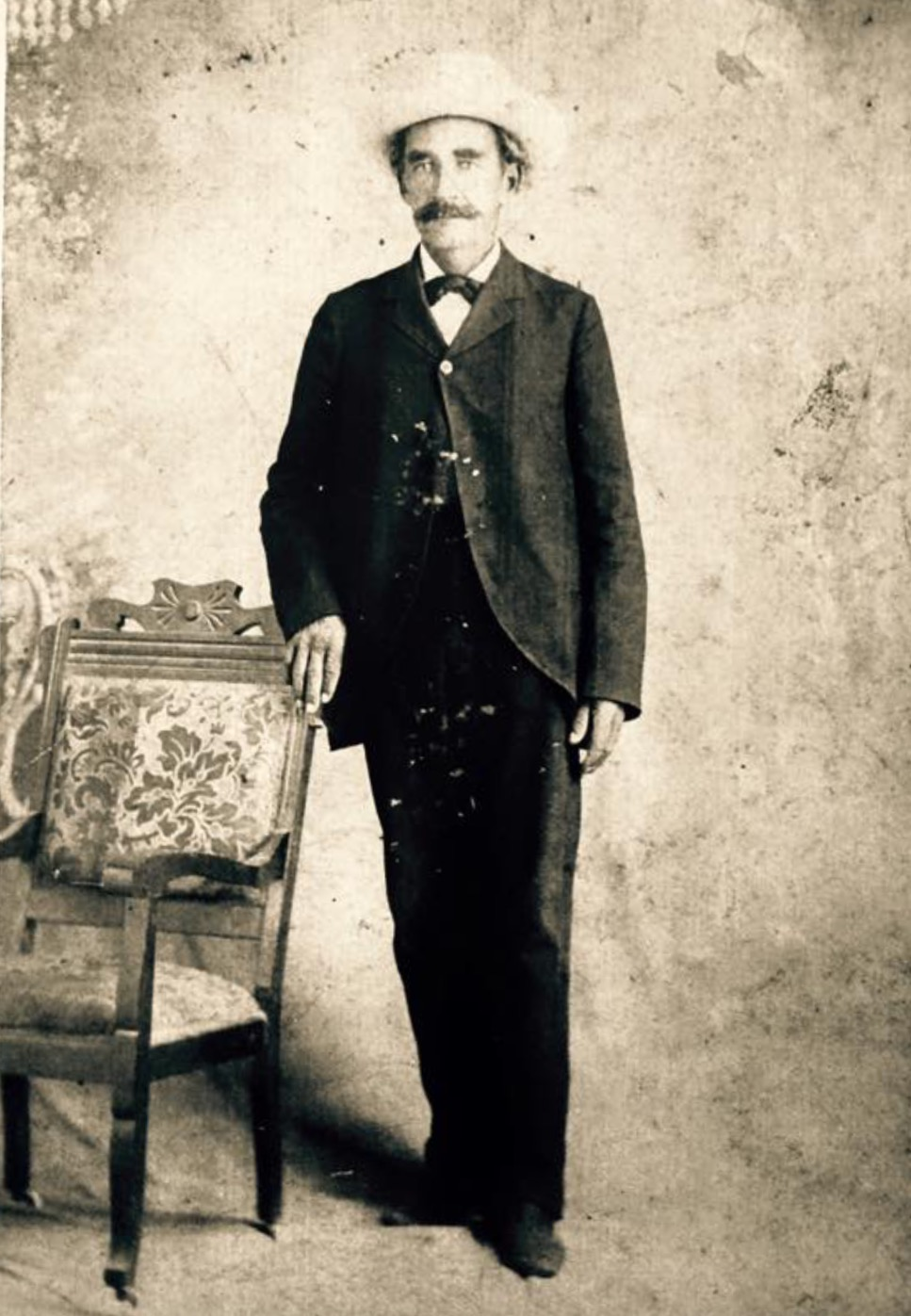
Captain Manuel A. Gonzalez, Founder of Fort Myers, Florida

Manuel A. Gonzalez (November 24, 1832 – February 25, 1902), also known as "The Father of Fort Myers, Florida" was a 19th-century pioneer and steamship captain who founded Fort Myers, Florida on February 21, 1866.

== Biography ==
Gonzalez left his home in Asturias Province, Spain in 1846 and traveled to America where he became a naturalized U.S. citizen in May 1859, in Key West, Florida. During the Seminole Indian War and American Civil War, Gonzalez assisted the Union Army by delivering mail and other supplies to troops stationed at a federal garrison in Southwest Florida known as Fort Myers. Following the Civil War, the U.S. Government abandoned Fort Myers. On February 21, 1866, Manuel A. Gonzalez and his 5-year-old son Manuel S. Gonzalez became the first permanent settlers of Fort Myers after arriving by boat from Key West, Florida at the remains of the abandoned federal garrison. Manuel and his son made repairs on what would become the Gonzalez family home located at what is now the corner of First and Jackson streets. Three weeks later, Joseph Vivas and his wife Christianna Stirrup Vivas arrived at the Fort with Manuel A. Gonzalez's wife, Evalina Weatherford Gonzalez and daughter Mary Gonzalez.

Eventually Gonzalez owned a wide swath of riverfront in Fort Myers, including the property that Thomas Edison and Henry Ford later purchased to construct the famous Edison and Ford Winter Estates. As the Fort Myers News-Press later reported: "In 1872, he moved out of town to a creek that now bears his name, Manuel's Branch. In the 1890s, he built a home on Monroe Street on a site that became the Atlantic Coast Line depot."

His son, Manuel S. Gonzalez, wrote in the mid-20th century about the early days:

In the spring of 1866, a quartet of people landed here, in what was at that time an abandoned wilderness. ... My father, Manuel A. Gonzalez; John A. Weatherford, an uncle of mine; Joseph A. Vivas, a friend of our family; and myself, M.S. Gonzalez (then but 5 years of age) constituted the quartet. ... We arrived here in a sailing vessel. ... The boat returned to Key West ... leaving my father and myself here all alone until the boat should return, which was about three weeks.

The Florida House of Representatives adopted a resolution declaring February 21, 2016 as "Fort Myers Founders Day" in commemoration of the 150th Anniversary of Captain Manuel Gonzalez arriving at the abandoned fort to found the Fort Myers Community on February 21, 1866. Florida Governor Rick Scott issued a Proclamation in commemoration of the Sesquicentennial of the founding of Fort Myers by Captain Gonzalez.
