= Santa Elena (Spanish Florida) =

Settlement in Spanish Florida (1566–1587)

- Settlement
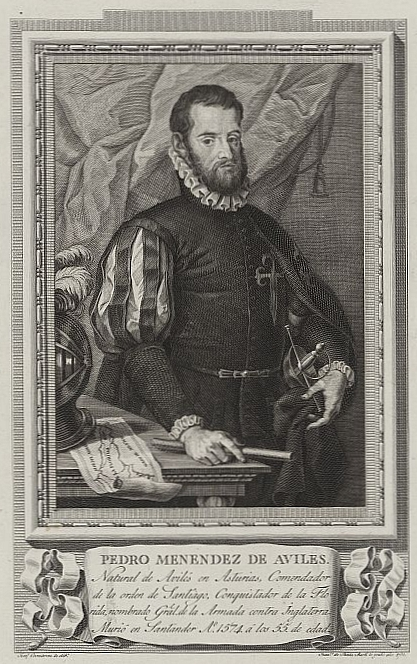
- Pedro Menéndez de Avilés, founder of the settlement

- Location within South Carolina
- Coordinates: 32°18′23″N 80°40′32″W
- Country: Spanish Empire
- Established: 1566

Santa Elena, a Spanish settlement on what is now Parris Island, South Carolina, was the capital of Spanish Florida from 1566 to 1587. It was established under Pedro Menéndez de Avilés, the first governor of Spanish Florida. There had been a number of earlier attempts to establish colonies in the area by both the Spanish and the French, who had been inspired by the earlier accounts by Chicora and Hernando de Soto of rich territories in the interior. Menéndez's Santa Elena settlement was intended as the new capital of the Spanish colony of La Florida, shifting the focus of Spanish colonial efforts north from St. Augustine, which had been established in 1565 to oust the French from their colony of Fort Caroline. Santa Elena was ultimately built at the site of the abandoned French outpost of Charlesfort, founded in 1562 by Jean Ribault.

In 1565 Menéndez destroyed the French Fort Caroline and then founded Santa Elena. This colony had a sizeable population, including missionaries and soldiers. The settlement became the base of operations for the Jesuits and military working in the northern zone of Spanish Florida. From this base the Spanish founded six other forts during the Captain Juan Pardo expedition into the interior and the Appalachian Mountains. But local Native American tribes resisted, killing the garrisons and destroying all the forts in 1568. Spain abandoned thoughts of colonizing this area.

In 1586 Francis Drake led an English force in a raid on St. Augustine. The Spanish abandoned Santa Elena the following year, and its remaining settlers were relocated to St. Augustine to strengthen it. The Spanish never pressed their colonial claims to the area again, focusing on other areas of the American continent.

== History ==
Interest in the area was piqued following exploration of some part of what is now the coastal southeastern United States by Francisco Gordillo and Pedro de Quejo in 1521. Accounts of the region's abundance from Quejo and Francisco de Chicora, one of the 70 Indians whom the expedition brought to Hispaniola, inspired Lucas Vázquez de Ayllón to establish the short-lived colony of San Miguel de Gualdape. This was abandoned after a few months.

In 1540 Hernando de Soto's expedition found European goods in the wealthy chiefdom of Cofitachequi (in present-day South Carolina), and determined they were near the site of Ayllón's colony. Their accounts of wealthy lands inspired further colonial ambitions. In 1559, Tristán de Luna y Arellano established a settlement at present-day Pensacola, Florida, as a base for future colonization of Santa Elena, but this mission failed. The French also heard the early accounts and took an interest in the area; in 1562 Jean Ribault came to modern-day Parris Island and set up the short-lived settlement of Charlesfort there. However, this was abandoned the following year after a Spanish attack.

Governor Pedro Menéndez de Avilés founded St. Augustine in 1565 in response to the French building of Fort Caroline the previous year in what is now Jacksonville, Florida, by René Goulaine de Laudonnière. Menéndez burned Fort Caroline and dislodged the French from Florida. In 1566 the Spanish shifted their efforts back to colonizing Santa Elena, and a settlement was founded in 1566. Menéndez ordered Captain Juan Pardo, to lead an expedition from Santa Elena to the interior of Southeast North America. Pardo's mission was to pacify and convert the natives and find an overland route to silver mines in central Mexico. The Spanish mistakenly thought that the Appalachian Mountains were connected to a range there.

The initial Pardo expedition left in December 1566 with 125 men. They created the first Spanish and European settlement in the interior of what became North Carolina. Pardo led his men to Joara, a large chiefdom of the Mississippian culture north of present-day Morganton. Pardo renamed the town as Cuenca, after his home town, claiming it for Spain. The Spanish built Fort San Juan here and made a base for the winter. Pardo left a contingent of 30 men. In an expedition the following year, Pardo built five more forts, leaving garrisons along the Appalachian spine as far as Chiaha in southeastern modern Tennessee. He returned to Santa Elena without returning through Joara. In 1568 the natives attacked the soldiers, killing all but one of the 120 in these garrisons and burning all the forts. The Spanish never returned to press their colonial claim in the interior. (The sites of Joara and Fort San Juan were identified through excavation, which continues, and announced in the early 21st century.

In 1576, natives of the nearby Orista and Escamacu settlements burned Santa Elena. The Spanish abandoned Fort San Felipe, which was also burned. A year later, the Spanish returned and rebuilt the settlement, at the same time constructing Fort San Marcos. In 1580, the Spanish repelled an attack on the island by 2,000 natives.

In May 1586 Francis Drake led an English force to raid and burn St. Augustine in La Florida. The Spanish feared another raid, and concluded that their settlements were being overstretched, undermanned and underarmed. Governor Pedro Menéndez Márquez conferred with the Council of the Indies in Seville (who received confirmation of St. Augustine's destruction by July) and King Philip II of Spain. They decided to concentrate their colonial efforts at St. Augustine. Mendendez abandoned Santa Elena and Parris Island. This marked the end of the permanent Spanish presence in what today is South Carolina. The Spanish retreated to present-day Florida, deciding to focus on colonizing other areas of the continent. The Escamacu people, who converted to Roman Catholicism before the Spaniards abandoned the site in 1587, kept their religion. They survived as a tribe into the early 17th century; after that they assimilated into larger tribes.

During the 21 years of Spanish occupation, Santa Elena was the site of several forts, including Fort San Salvador, built by Menéndez in 1566; Fort San Felipe, established after the arrival of additional troops and supplies; and Fort San Marcos, erected during the second occupation at Santa Elena. Since the late 20th century, the site of Santa Elena has been extensively studied through archaeological studies and multi-disciplinary investigation.

== Missions ==
A few missions to Native people living in the vicinity of Santa Elena were established from 1566 to 1570, including Escamau-Orista, Guatari, and Joadi.

== Governors ==
- Vicente González and Tomás Bernaldo de Quirós: 1577 to 1580
- Juan de Posada: 1588-1589

== See also ==
- Charlesfort-Santa Elena Site
- List of Jesuit sites
