= Pedro Menéndez de Avilés =

Spanish explorer and governor (1519–1574)

Adelantado Pedro Menéndez de Avilés
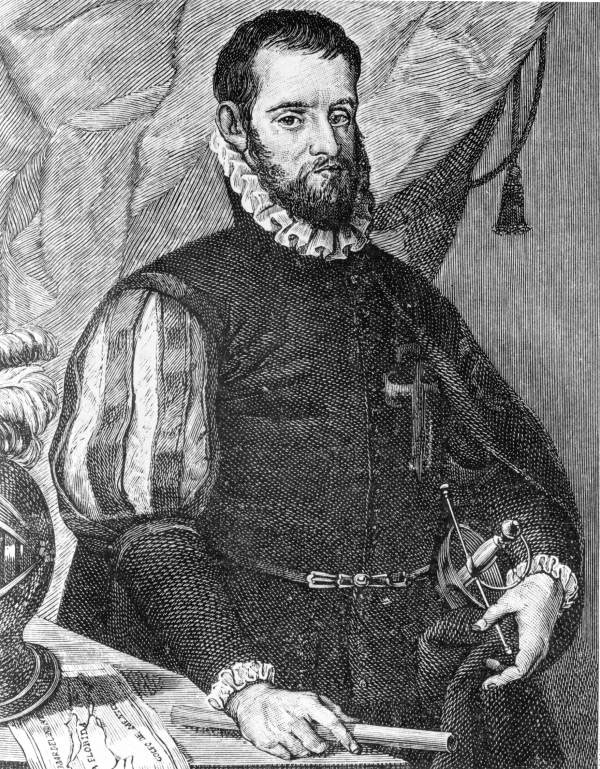
- Pedro Menéndez de Avilés

1st Governor of Florida
- In office 1565–1574
- Lieutenant: Vacant
- Succeeded by: Diego de Velasco

Personal details
- Born: 15 February 1519 Avilés, Asturias, Spain
- Died: 17 September 1574 (aged 55) Santander, Cantabria, Spain
- Occupation: Admiral; 16th-century colonial governor of La Florida and Cuba, in New Spain

Pedro Menéndez de Avilés (Note: Spanish pronunciation: [ˈpeðɾo meˈnendeθ ðe aβiˈles]; Asturian: Pedro (Menéndez) d'Avilés;) (15 February 1519 – 17 September 1574) was a Spanish admiral, explorer, and conquistador from Avilés, in Asturias, Spain. He is notable for planning the first regular trans-oceanic convoys, which became known as the Spanish treasure fleet, and for founding St. Augustine, Florida, in 1565, he is also known for his Pre-Pilgrim Thanksgiving. This was the first successful European settlement in Spanish Florida and the most significant city in the region for nearly three centuries.

St. Augustine is the oldest continuously inhabited, European-established settlement in the continental United States. Menéndez de Avilés was the first governor of La Florida (1565–74). By his contract, or asiento, with Philip II, Menéndez was appointed adelantado and was responsible for implementing royal policies to build fortifications for the defense of conquered territories in La Florida and to establish Castilian governmental institutions in desirable areas.

== Early years ==
Pedro Menéndez de Avilés was born to an old noble family in the kingdom of Asturias. He was one of the younger sons of Juan Alonso Sánchez de Avilés, who had served the Catholic Monarchs in the War of Granada, and María Alonso y Menéndez Arango. His parents had twenty children, and Pedro was still a child when his father died.

After his mother remarried, Pedro was sent to live with a relative who promised to oversee his education. Pedro and his guardian did not get along, and he ran away from home. He was found six months later in Valladolid and taken back to his foster home. Eventually Menéndez entered the military and went off to fight in one of the wars with France. He served at sea in a small armada against the French corsairs who harassed the maritime commerce of Spain.

== Military career ==
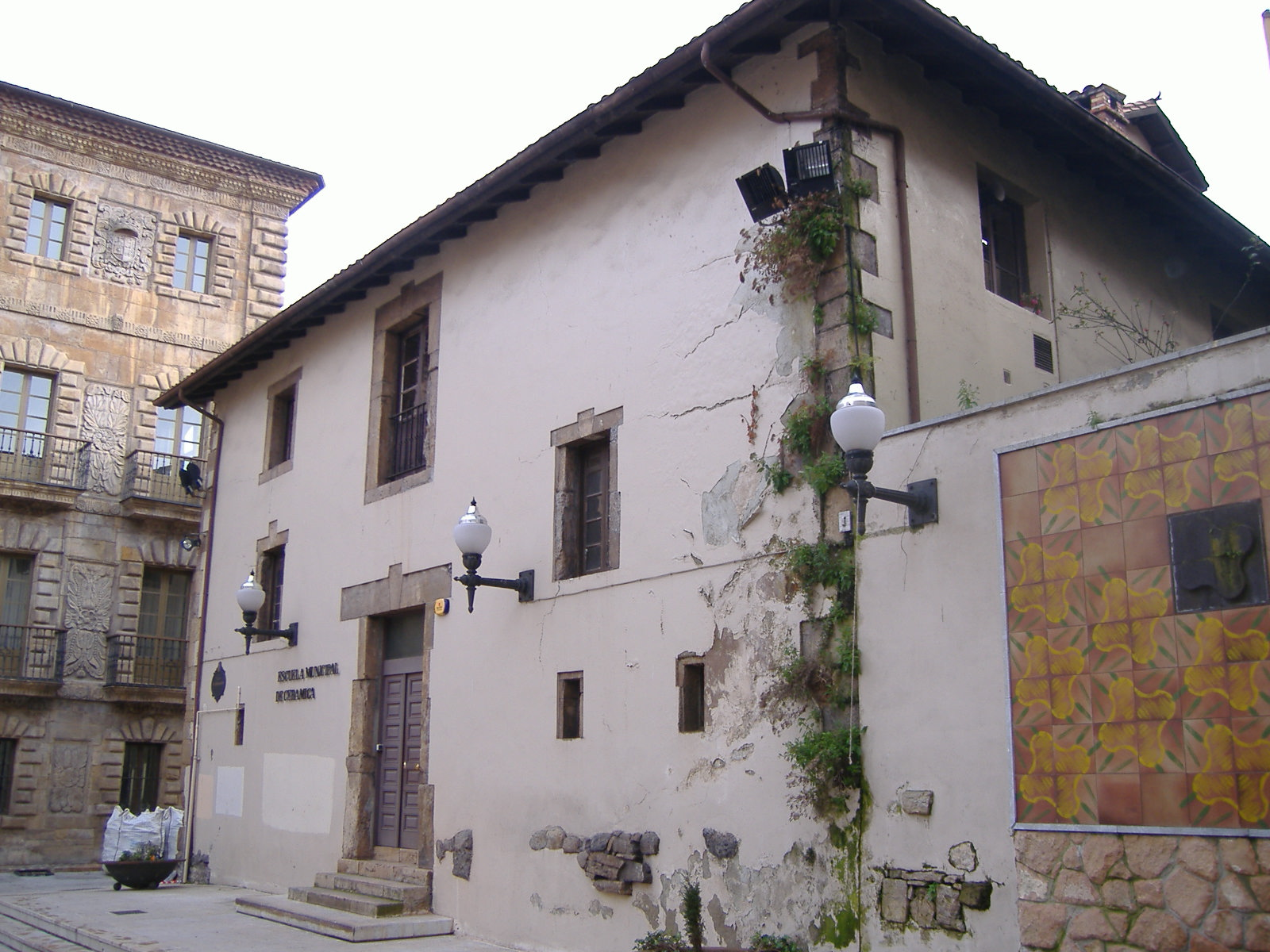
The house in Avilés where Pedro Menéndez de Aviles was born

After two years of fighting, Menéndez returned to his family, having conceived a plan to use part of his inheritance to build his own vessel. He built a patache, a small but fast row-sailer, suitable for patrolling the coast. He recruited a number of his relatives to sail with him in search of adventure.

In this ship, the young Menéndez won his first victory of command in an engagement with French corsairs who had attacked three slow Spanish freighters off the coast of Galicia. By effective captainship, he separated the two swift zabras (Biscayan frigates) that pursued him and captured them both, and drove away the third. The exploits of Pedro Menéndez soon became a topic of conversation on the waterfronts of Spain and France, and in the royal courts. Meanwhile, the Seville merchants and the Casa de Contratación (House of Trade) were chagrined by Menéndez's success and his growing influence with the Crown.

=== Treasure fleet ===
Menéndez is credited as the Spanish leader who first surveyed and authorized the building of the royal fortresses at major Caribbean ports. He was appointed by the Crown in 1554 as Captain-General of the Fleet of the Indies, the Spanish treasure fleet; that year he departed with the fleet and brought it back safely to Spain. He was affirmed in his belief of the strategic importance of the Bahama Channel and that Havana, on the island of Cuba, was the key port to conduct a rendezvous of the annual Flota of treasure galleons. The appointment was highly prestigious, and it was unusual for the Crown to make the appointment. In the past the Casa de Contratación had controlled this position.

King Phillip II and Menéndez maintained a close relationship. The Crown invited him to be a part of the Royal Party when Phillip married Mary I, Queen of England.

In 1559, Philip II again appointed Menéndez as Captain General, and his brother Bartolomé Menéndez as Admiral, of the Fleet of the Indies. He sailed for the Indies that October as captain general and commanded the galleons of the great Armada de la Carrera, or Spanish Treasure Fleet, on their return voyage from the Caribbean and Mexico to Spain. Menéndez determined the route they followed, which led through the Florida Strait (Spanish: Estrecho de Florida) and up the east coast of Florida, taking advantage of the current of the Gulf Stream. In 1561, however, Menéndez was jailed by Casa officials for alleged smuggling, but he got his case transferred to court and won his release.

Menéndez is credited as the chief planner of the formalized Spanish treasure fleet convoy system that became the main link between Spain and her overseas territories. In 1561, he designed and built a twelve-ship flotilla of 230-ton galley-like galleons (galeones agalerados) inspired by the Atlantic galleasses built by Álvaro de Bazán the Elder. The ships were used to escort the treasure fleet, being soon known as the "Twelve Apostles" for their reliability and success at hunting down foreign piracy and privateering. They were also used in combination with two heavy, 800-ton galleasses built by Cristóbal de Barros. Furthermore, in partnership with Bazán the Younger, he helped design the great galleons that carried the trade between Cádiz in Spain and Vera Cruz in Spanish Mexico.

Later, in his capacity as adelantado, Menéndez was required to explore this vast territory, which extended from the Gulf coast of present-day western Florida around the Florida keys to Newfoundland. He also was commanded by the king to establish two or three fortified presidios and settle them with settlers and slaves, and to begin the conversion of the Indians to Catholicism.

=== Enterprise of La Florida ===
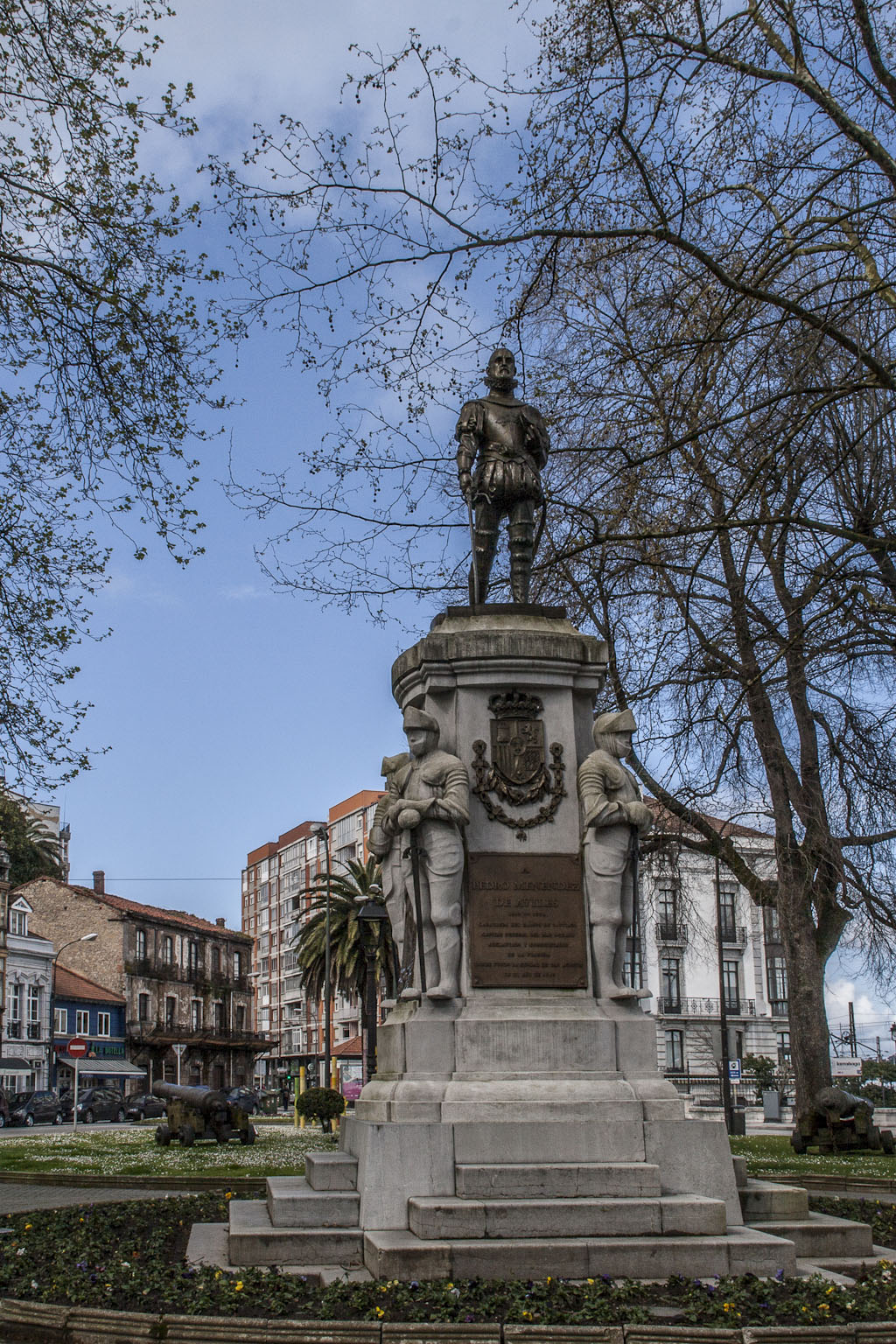
Monument to Pedro Menéndez in his hometown, in Spain

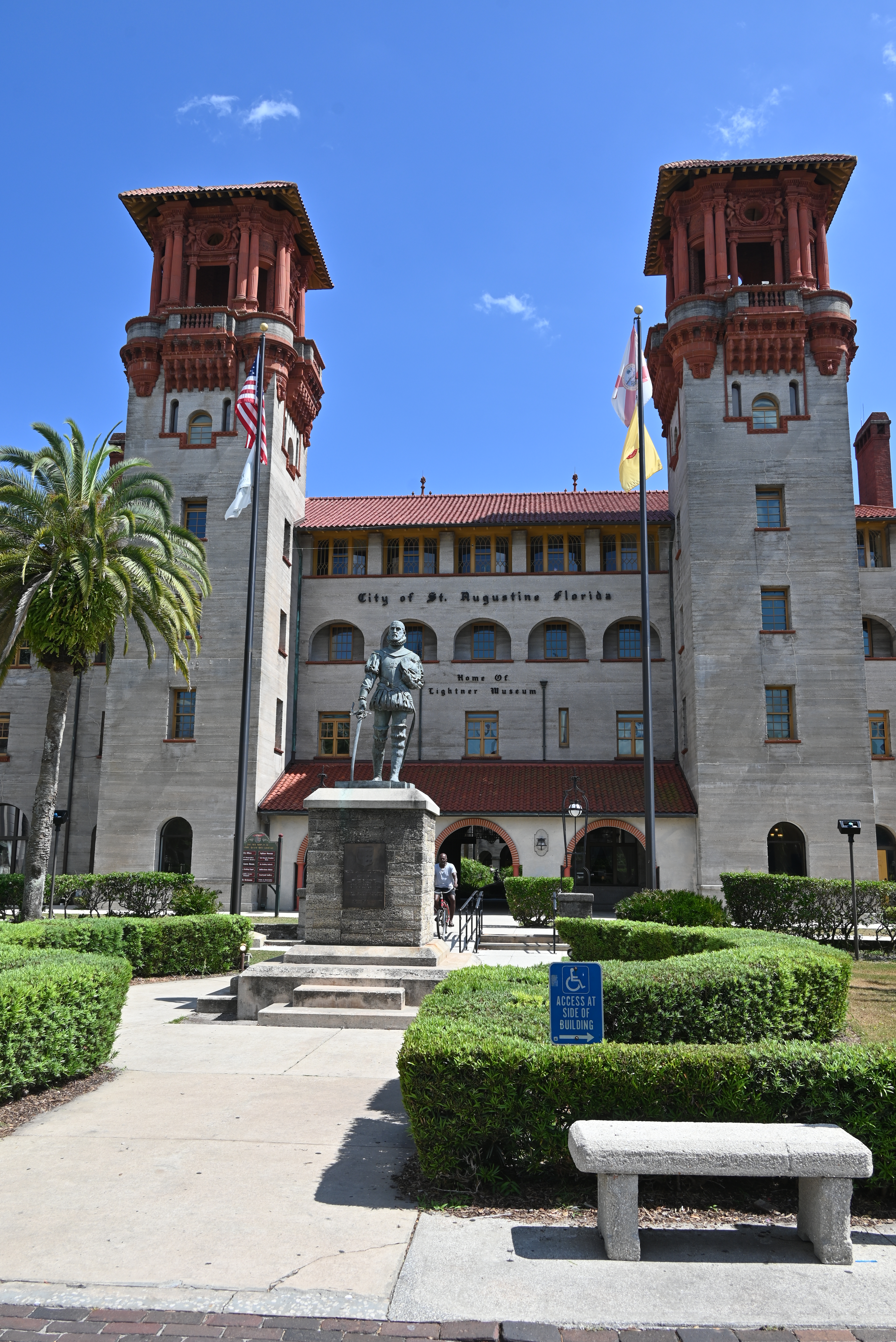
Statue in St. Augustine, Florida, at the Lightner Museum

In 1562, a group of Huguenots led by Jean Ribault arrived in territory claimed by Spain and called La Florida. They explored the mouth of the St. Johns River in Florida, calling it la Rivière de Mai (the River May). The French sailed northward and established a settlement called Charlesfort at Port Royal Sound in present-day South Carolina.

On 19 August 1563, Pedro Menéndez and his brother Bartolomé were imprisoned by the Casa de Contratación, accused of accepting bribes and smuggling silver into Spain. In September, he received news that La Concepción, flagship of the New Spain fleet and commanded by his son Admiral Juan Menéndez, had disappeared off the coast of South Carolina, and Juan was assumed to be dead. The ship was lost in a hurricane that scattered the fleet as it was returning to Spain, at the latitude of Bermuda off the coast of South Carolina. Menéndez conceived a plan for a voyage to La Florida to search for his son, who he believed might have reached there, but he was powerless to initiate it from prison, and his petitions to King Philip II went unanswered.

Spain learned of the French expedition to Florida through its spies at ports on the Atlantic coast of France. Philip II was alarmed when Dr. Gabriel de Enveja reported that Jean Ribault had been appointed as "Captain-General and Viceroy of New France". He also said that a large expedition of ships, soldiers and supplies was being fitted at Dieppe for a voyage to Florida: it was to have more than 500 arquebusiers, and many dismounted bronze cannons were loaded aboard the vessels.

After his release from prison, Menéndez was available again to serve the king's purposes. He was appointed as adelantado of La Florida, with the promise of a large land grant and the title of marquis if he was successful. He advised the king of the strategic importance of exploring the Florida coast for discovery of trade passages to the riches of China and Molucca. There was the hope that such waterways might also lead to the mines of New Spain in central Mexico and to the Pacific. He proposed colonizing several areas to defend the territory against incursions by the Indians and foreign powers.

Menéndez expected to make vast profits for himself and to increase the royal treasury with this Florida enterprise, as it was to include the development of agriculture, fisheries, and naval stores. This ambitious venture was supported materially and politically by his kinship alliance of seventeen families from northern Spain, all tied by blood relations and marriage. They pledged their persons and fortunes to the adelentado, hoping to enrich themselves later with large grants of lands and royal honors of civil and military offices in La Florida. This support gave Menéndez a loyal cadre of lieutenants and officials who had blood connection to him, and had invested their own futures in his success.

In early 1564 Menéndez asked permission to go to Florida to search for La Concepcion and his son, Admiral Juan Menéndez, who had been its commander. As noted above, they were lost in 1563 in a hurricane. The crown continued to refuse his request.

René de Laudonnière, a Huguenot aristocrat who had participated in the first Jean Ribault expedition, returned to Florida in 1564 with three ships and 300 Huguenot colonists. He reached the River May on 22 June 1564, sailed up it a few miles, and founded Fort Caroline. The Crown was alarmed by these encroachments on Spanish territory in such proximity to the course of the Spanish treasure fleet.

Desiring to protect its claimed territories in North America against further incursions by European powers, the Spanish Crown issued an asiento to Menéndez, signed by Philip II on 20 March 1565, granting him expansive trade privileges, the power to distribute lands, and licenses to sell 500 slaves, as well as various titles, including that of adelantado of Florida. Menéndez was commissioned to reconnoiter North America from the Florida Keys to present-day Canada, and report on its coastal features, with a view to establishing a permanent settlement for the defense of the Spanish treasure fleet. He was ordered as well to drive away any intruders who were not subjects of the Spanish crown.

On 28 July 1565, Menéndez set sail from Cádiz with a fleet led by his 600-ton flagship, the San Pelayo, accompanied by several smaller ships, and carrying over 1,000 sailors, soldiers, and settlers. On the feast day of St. Augustine, 28 August, the fleet sighted land and anchored off the north inlet of the Matanzas River that the French called the River of Dolphins. This was developed as the site of the present-day city of St. Augustine. Menéndez sailed north and confronted Ribault's fleet outside the bar of the River May in a brief skirmish. On 6 September, he returned to his first landfall, naming the site it after the Catholic saint, disembarked his troops, and quickly constructed fortifications to protect his people and supplies.

Father Francisco López de Mendoza Grajales, the chaplain of the expedition, celebrated the first Thanksgiving Mass on the grounds. The formal Franciscan outpost, Mission Nombre de Dios, was founded at the landing point, perhaps the first mission in what would become the continental United States. The mission served nearby villages of the Mocama, a Timucua group, and was at the center of an important chiefdom in the late 16th and 17th century.

Menéndez marched his soldiers overland from St. Augustine to destroy the French settlement at Fort Caroline on the St. Johns River. On 20 September 1565, they made a surprise attack and killed all the adult men they encountered, but spared women and children; 132 Frenchmen were killed. Laudonnière and several score Frenchmen escaped into the woods. Menéndez left a Spanish garrison at the captured fort, now renamed San Mateo. (In 1568 French soldiers led by Dominique de Gourgues returned and destroyed it, killing the Spanish garrison in retaliation for the 1565 massacre.)

Menéndez pursued Jean Ribault, who had already left with four ships to attack the Spanish at St. Augustine. After Ribault had put out to sea, he was surprised by a storm that wrecked three of his ships near what is now the Ponce de Leon Inlet. His flagship was grounded near present-day Cape Canaveral. Informed by Indian allies that the French survivors were walking northward on the coast, Menéndez began to search for them, finding the party at the banks of the Matanzas River's south entrance. After several parleys with the Spanish, Ribault and the 150–350 Frenchmen with him (sources differ) surrendered. The Spanish executed nearly all of them in the dunes near the inlet. It was later known as Matanzas (Spanish for "slaughters"). Having taken control of the Florida coast, Menéndez had his soldiers complete the fort in St. Augustine. He also established missions to the natives for the Catholic Church, and explored the east coast and interior of the peninsula.

In May 1566, as relations with the neighboring Timucua Indians deteriorated, Menéndez moved the Spanish settlement to a more defensible position on the north end of the barrier island between the mainland and the sea, building a wooden fort there. In 1572, the settlement was relocated to the mainland, in the area just south of the future town plaza. Secure as governor, Menéndez explored the area and built additional fortifications.

He also commissioned the Juan Pardo expedition, to travel from Santa Elena, at Port Royal Sound in present-day South Carolina, into the interior of the Southeast. Captain Pardo was to find and supply an alternate overland route to the Spanish silver mines in central Mexico, as the Spanish mistakenly thought the Appalachian Mountains were part of a range extending that far. In the next couple of years, Pardo and his men traveled into present-day South Carolina and Western North Carolina, stopping at the Mississippian chiefdom of Joara, where they built Fort San Juan and wintered over. In total, his expedition built six forts along this route, including one known as San Pedro at Olamico, the principal town of Chiaha in southeastern Tennessee. Pardo left the expedition for other business. In 1568 all the Spanish men but one in the garrisons were killed by Native Americans resisting their treatment, and the forts were destroyed. The Spanish did not attempt other colonization in this region.

Confident that he had fulfilled his primary contract with the King, including construction of forts along the coast of La Florida, Menéndez returned to Spain in 1567. He was appointed governor of Cuba, in October of that year. After several more transatlantic crossings, Menéndez fell ill and died on 17 September 1574.

== Later years ==
Menéndez traveled to southwest Florida, looking for his son. There he made contact with the Calusa tribe, an advanced maritime people, at what is now known as Mound Key, in Estero Bay. He negotiated an initial peace with their leader, Carlos, which was solidified by Menéndez's marriage to Carlos's sister, who took the baptismal name Doña Antonia. The peace was uneasy, and Menéndez's use of his new wife as a hostage in negotiations with her people, as well as his negotiating with the Calusas' enemies, the Tocobagas, helped cause the decline of relations to all out war, which continued intermittently into the next century. Menéndez was unsuccessful in locating his son Juan.

Establishing a Spanish garrison of 200 men further up the coast, he sailed to what is today the Georgia coast making contact with the local Indians of St. Catherines Island before returning to Florida, where he expanded Spanish power throughout southeastern Florida. His position as governor now secure, Menéndez explored the area and built additional fortifications. In 1567, he marched south and encountered the Ais (Jece) as he reached the Indian River near present-day Vero Beach. He returned to Spain in 1567 and was appointed governor of Cuba, in October of that year.

In December 1571, Menéndez was sailing from Florida to Havana with two frigates when, as he tells it, "I was wrecked at Cape Canaveral because of a storm which came upon me, and the other boat was lost fifteen leagues further on in the Bahama Channel, in a river they call the Ais, because the cacique (chief) is so called. I, by a miracle reached the fort of St. Augustine with seventeen persons I was taking with me. Three times the Indians gave the order to attack me, and the way I escaped them was by ingenuity and arousing fear in them, telling them that behind me many Spaniards were coming who would slay them if they found them." The Ais, like the Tequesta and Calusa tribes, proved hostile to Spanish settlement as war continued on and off until 1670.

Menéndez later made contact with the less hostile Tequesta at their capital in El Portal (in what is now Miami) and was able to negotiate for three chieftains to accompany him to Cuba as translators to the Arawak. Although Menéndez left behind Jesuit missionaries Brother Francisco de Villareal and Padre Rogel in an attempt to convert the Tequesta to Roman Catholicism, the tribe were indifferent to their teachings. The Jesuits returned to St. Augustine after a year.

Menéndez voyaged to La Florida for the last time in 1571, with 650 settlers for Santa Elena, as well as his wife and family. In August 1572, Menéndez led a ship with thirty soldiers and sailors to take revenge for the killing of the Jesuits of the Ajacán Mission in present-day Virginia. At the end of his life, he was appointed as governor of Cuba shortly after his arrival. Menéndez died of typhus at Santander, Spain, on 17 September 1574.

== Legacy ==
- Pedro Menendez High School on State Road 206 in Saint Johns County is named after him, as well as several streets in the area.
- The World War II Liberty Ship SS Pedro Menendez was named in his honor.
- A new F110-class frigate of the Armada will be named after him.

== See also ==
- El Portal, Florida
- History of Florida
- Roman Catholic Diocese of St. Augustine
- St. Augustine, Florida
- Spanish Florida

== Primary resources ==
- Pedro Menéndez de Avilés Sailing Order, 1572 July 3. From the Collections at the Library of Congress
