= Spanish Florida =

Former Spanish possession in North America

Governorate of Florida La Florida (Spanish)
- 1513–1763
- Motto: Plus Ultra transl. Further Beyond
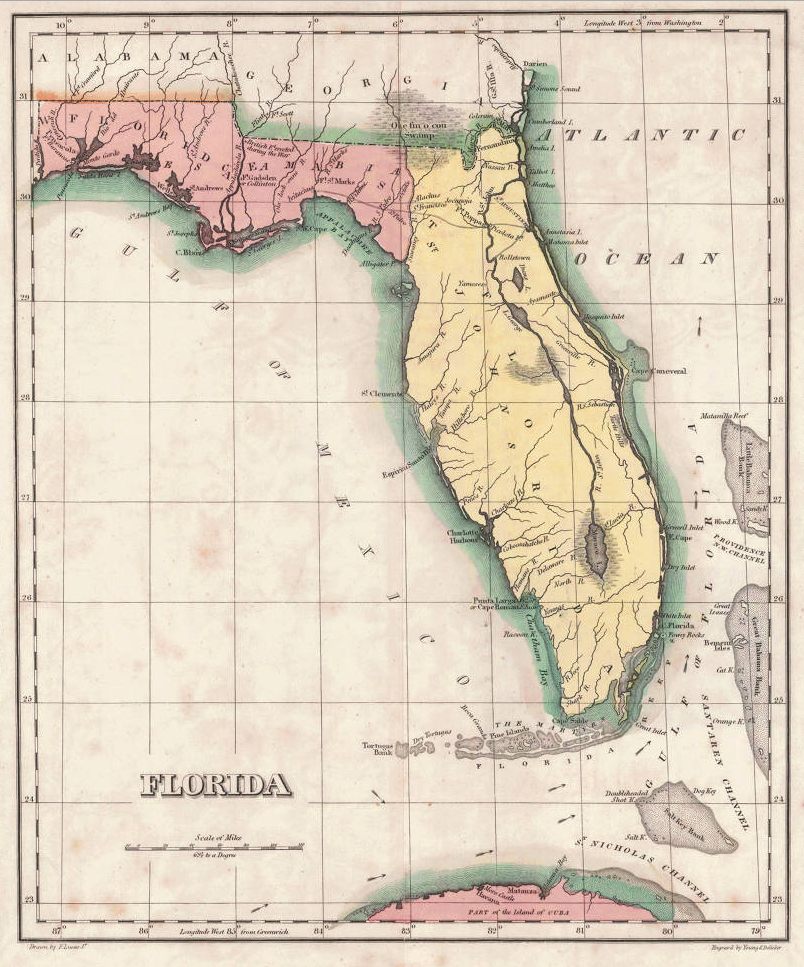
- Status: Governorate of the Spanish Empire
- Capital: San Agustín
- Government: Monarchy
- King
  - 1565–1598 (first): Philip II
  - 1759–1763 (last): Charles III
- Governor
  - 1565–1574 (first): Pedro Menéndez de Avilés
  - 1762–1763 (last): Melchor Feliú
- History
  - Spanish exploration and settlement: 1513
  - San Miguel de Gualdape establishment and abandonment: 1526
  - Initial Pensacola establishment, abandonment, and re-establishment at Presidio Santa Maria de Galve: 1559–1561
  - Fort Caroline establishment as part of French Florida and Spanish sacking: 1564–1565
  - St. Augustine establishment: 1565
  - Santa Elena establishment at Charlesfort and abandonment: 1566–1587
  - Transferred to Britain: 10 February 1763
Preceded by	Succeeded by
Indigenous peoples of Florida	East Florida; West Florida
- Today part of: United States: Southern Alabama; Florida; Southeastern Georgia; Southeastern Louisiana; Southern Mississippi; Southern South Carolina

Spanish Florida (Spanish: La Florida) was the first major European land claim and attempted settlement area in northern America during the European Age of Discovery. La Florida formed part of the Captaincy General of Cuba in the Viceroyalty of New Spain, and the Spanish Empire during Spanish colonization of the Americas.

While its boundaries were never clearly or formally defined, the territory was initially much larger than the present-day state of Florida, extending over much of what is now the southeastern United States, including all of present-day Florida plus portions of Georgia, South Carolina, North Carolina, Alabama, Mississippi, and the Florida Parishes of Louisiana. (Note: The adelantamiento granted to Pedro Menéndez de Avilés in 1565 defined Florida to include the coast of North America from St. Joseph Bay on the Gulf of Mexico around the Florida peninsula and up the east coast of North America to Terra Nova, with an undefined area inland of that coast.) Spain based its claim to this vast area on several wide-ranging expeditions mounted during the 16th century. A number of missions, settlements, and small forts existed in the 16th and to a lesser extent in the 17th century; they were eventually abandoned due to pressure from the expanding English and French colonial settlements, the collapse of the native populations, and the general difficulty in becoming agriculturally or economically self-sufficient. By the 18th century, Spain's control over La Florida did not extend much beyond a handful of forts near St. Augustine, St. Marks, and Pensacola, all within the boundaries of present-day Florida.

The Spanish Empire regarded Florida as a backwater, which served primarily as a strategic buffer between the rest of New Spain and the expanding English colonies to the north. In contrast with the conquistadors of Mexico or of Peru, the Spaniards in La Florida found no gold or silver. Due to disease and, later, raids by colonists of the Province of Carolina (chartered in 1663) and their Native American allies, the native population was not large enough for an encomienda system of forced agricultural labor, so Spain did not establish large plantations in Florida. Large free-range cattle ranches in north-central Florida were the most successful agricultural enterprise and were able to supply both local and Cuban markets. The coastal towns of Pensacola and St. Augustine also provided ports where Spanish ships needing water or supplies could stop and resupply.

Beginning in the 1630s, a series of missions stretching from St. Augustine to the Florida panhandle supplied St. Augustine with maize and other food crops, and the Spaniards required Apalachees who lived at the missions to send workers to St. Augustine every year to perform labor in the town. The missions were destroyed by Carolina and Creek raiders in a series of raids from 1702 to 1704, further reducing and dispersing the native population of Florida and reducing Spanish control over the area.

Great Britain took possession of Florida as part of the agreements ending the Seven Years' War in 1763, and the Spanish population largely emigrated to Cuba. The new colonial ruler divided the territory into East and West Florida.

== First Spanish period ==
=== Establishment of Spanish Florida ===
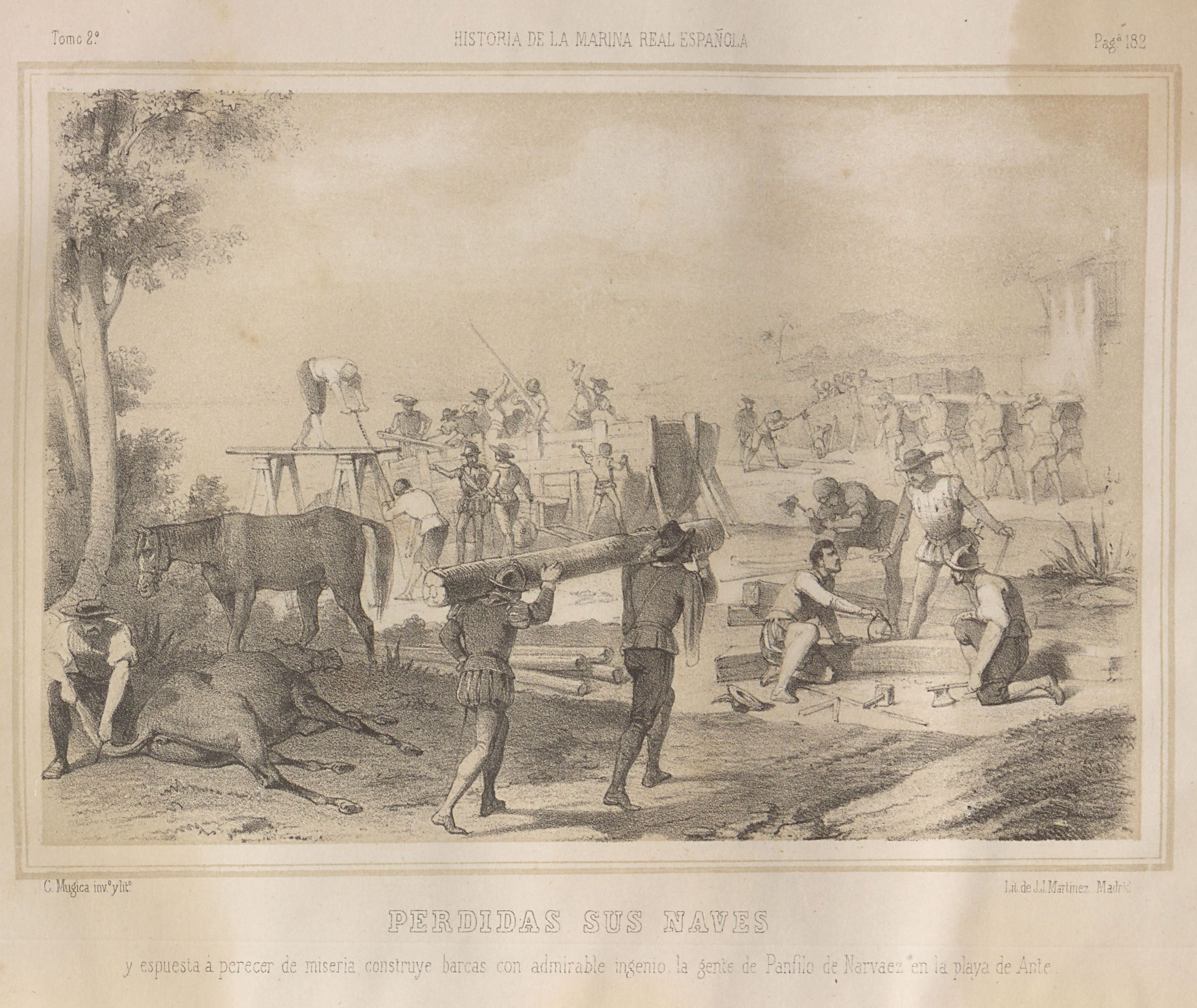
Narváez expedition in 1528, Apalachee Bay

Spanish Florida was established in 1513, when Juan Ponce de León claimed peninsular Florida for Spain during the first European expedition to the region. This claim was enlarged as several explorers (most notably Pánfilo Narváez and Hernando de Soto) landed near Tampa Bay in the mid-1500s and wandered as far north as the Appalachian Mountains and as far west as Texas in largely unsuccessful searches for gold.

The Spanish relied on alliances with indigenous leaders (caciques) to ensure colonial control over the people and territories of Florida during the late 16th century. Within the existing native political systems, caciques regularly allied with the Spanish to enhance their power, seek protection against rivals, and acquire exotic goods. These alliances were frequently unstable because of disease, violence and shifting colonial priorities.

Flag of Cross of Burgundy, symbol of Habsburg Spain. One theory suggests that the design of the current flag of Florida comes from this banner.

On September 8, 1565, Admiral Pedro Menéndez de Avilés landed with a band of settlers to found St. Augustine. Father Francisco López de Mendoza Grajales, the chaplain of the expedition, celebrated the first Thanksgiving Mass on the grounds. The formal Franciscan outpost, Mission Nombre de Dios, was founded at the landing point, perhaps the first mission in what would become the continental United States. The mission served nearby villages of the Mocama, a Timucua group, and was at the center of an important chiefdom in the late 16th and 17th century. A series of missions were then established across the Florida panhandle, Georgia, and South Carolina during the 1600s; and Pensacola was founded on the western Florida panhandle in 1698, strengthening Spanish claims to that section of the territory.

Spanish control of the Florida peninsula was much facilitated by the collapse of native cultures during the 17th century. Several Native American groups (including the Timucua, Calusa, Tequesta, Apalachee, Tocobaga, and the Ais people) had been long-established residents of Florida, and most resisted Spanish incursions onto their land. However, conflict with Spanish expeditions, raids by the Carolina colonists and their native allies, and (especially) diseases brought from Europe resulted in a drastic decline in the population of all the indigenous peoples of Florida, and large swaths of the peninsula were mostly uninhabited by the early 1700s. During the mid-1700s, small bands of Creek and other Native American refugees began moving south into Spanish Florida after having been forced off their lands by South Carolinan settlements and raids. They were later joined by African-Americans fleeing slavery in nearby colonies. These newcomers – plus perhaps a few surviving descendants of indigenous Florida peoples – eventually coalesced into a new Seminole culture.

=== Contraction of Spanish Florida ===
The extent of Spanish Florida began to shrink in the 1600s, and the mission system was gradually abandoned due to native depopulation. Between disease, poor management, and ill-timed hurricanes, several Spanish attempts to establish new settlements in La Florida ended in failure. With no gold or silver in the region, Spain regarded Florida (and particularly the heavily fortified town of St. Augustine) primarily as a buffer between its more prosperous colonies to the south and west and several newly established rival European colonies to the north. The establishment of the Province of Carolina by the English in 1639, New Orleans by the French in 1718, and of the Province of Georgia by Great Britain in 1732 limited the boundaries of Florida over Spanish objections. The War of Jenkins' Ear (1739–1748) included a British attack on St. Augustine and a Spanish invasion of Georgia, both of which were repulsed. At the conclusion of the war, the northern boundary of Spanish Florida was set near the current northern border of modern-day Florida.

=== Other European powers ===
Great Britain temporarily gained control of Florida beginning in 1763 as a result of the Anglo-Spanish War when the British captured Havana, the principal port of Spain's New World colonies. Peace was signed in February, 1763, and the British left Cuba in July that year, having traded Cuba to Spain for Florida (the Spanish population of Florida likewise traded positions and emigrated to the island). But while Britain occupied Floridan territory, it did not develop it further. Sparsely populated British Florida stayed loyal to the Crown during the American Revolutionary War, and by the terms of the Treaty of Paris which ended the war, the territory was returned to Spain in 1783. After a brief diplomatic border dispute with the fledgling United States, the countries set a territorial border and allowed Americans free navigation of the Mississippi River by the terms of Pinckney's Treaty in 1795.

France sold Louisiana to the United States in 1803. The U.S. claimed that the transaction included West Florida, while Spain insisted that the area was not part of Louisiana and was still Spanish territory. In 1810, the United States intervened in a local uprising in West Florida, and by 1812, the Mobile District was absorbed into the U.S. territory of Mississippi, reducing the borders of Spanish Florida to that of modern Florida.

In the early 1800s, tensions rose along the unguarded border between Spanish Florida and the state of Georgia as settlers skirmished with Seminoles over land and American slave-hunters raided Black Seminole villages in Florida. These tensions were exacerbated when the Seminoles aided Great Britain against the United States during the War of 1812 and led to American military incursions into northern Florida beginning in late 1814 during what became known as the First Seminole War. As with earlier American incursions into Florida, Spain protested this invasion but could not defend its territory, and instead opened diplomatic negotiations seeking a peaceful transfer of land. By the terms of the Adams–Onís Treaty of 1819, Spanish Florida ceased to exist in 1821, when control of the territory was officially transferred to the United States.

== Discovery and early exploration ==
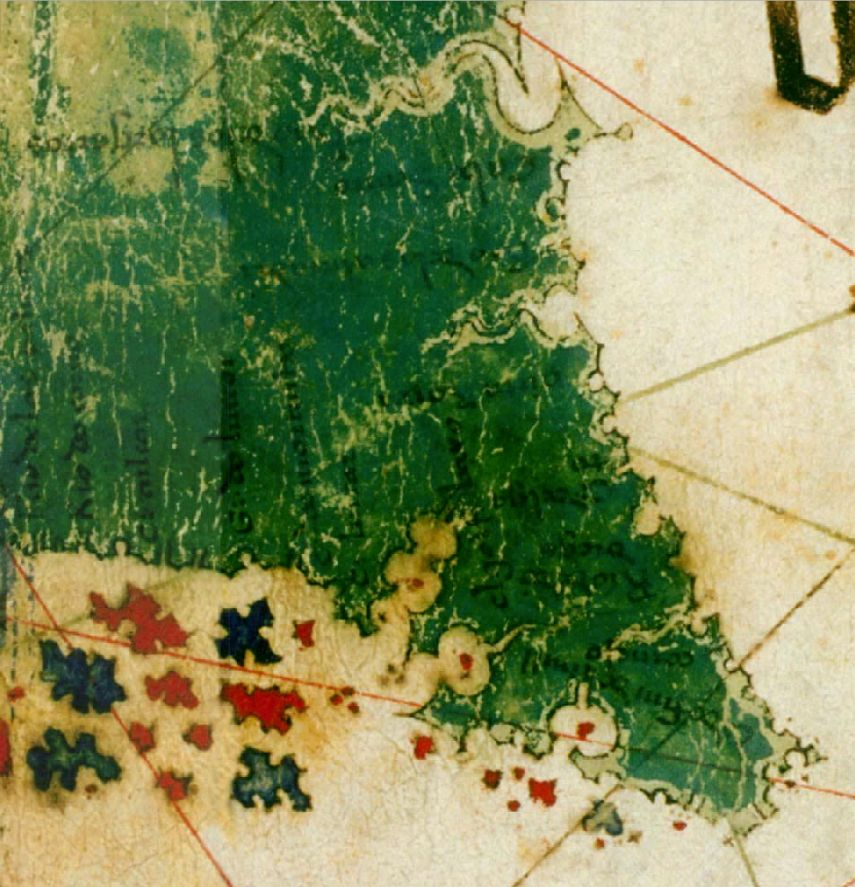
Florida from the 1502 Cantino planisphere

=== European discovery ===
Juan Ponce de León is generally credited as being the first European to discover Florida. However, Spanish raiders from the Caribbean may have conducted small secret raids in Florida to capture and enslave native Floridians at some time between 1500 and 1510. Furthermore, the Cantino planisphere of 1502 and several other European maps dating from the first decade of the 16th century show a landmass near Cuba that several historians have identified as Florida. This interpretation has led to the theory that anonymous Spanish, Portuguese, or other Europeans may have mapped the southeastern part of what would later become the United States before the first major colonization of Florida. This view is disputed by at least an equal number of historians.

==== Juan Ponce de León expedition ====
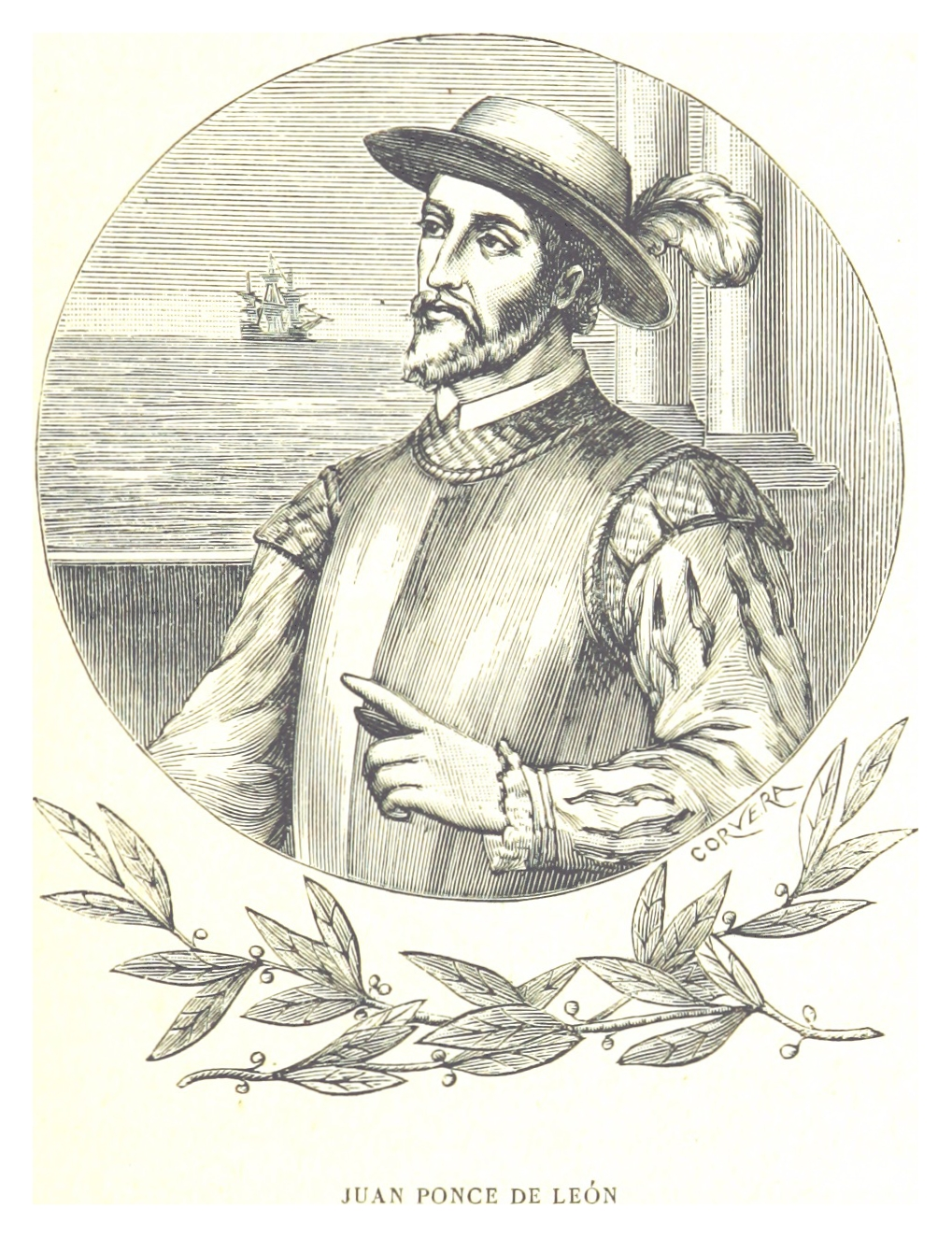
Juan Ponce de León claimed Florida for Spain in 1513.

In 1512, Juan Ponce de León, governor of Puerto Rico, received royal permission to search for land north of Cuba. On March 3, 1513, his expedition departed from Punta Aguada, Puerto Rico, sailing north in three ships. In late March, he spotted a small island (almost certainly one of the Bahamas) but did not land. On April 2, he spotted the east coast of the Florida peninsula and went ashore the next day at an exact location that has been lost to time. Assuming that he had found a large island, he claimed the land for Spain and named it La Florida, because it was the season of Pascua Florida ("Flowery Easter") and because much of the vegetation was in bloom. After briefly exploring the area around their landing site, the expedition returned to their ships and sailed south to map the coast, encountering the Gulf Stream along the way. The expedition followed Florida's coastline all the way around the Florida Keys and north to map a portion of the Southwest Florida coast before returning to Puerto Rico.

Ponce de León did not have substantial documented interactions with Native Americans during his voyage. However, the peoples he met (likely the Timucua, Tequesta, and Calusa) were mostly hostile at first contact and knew a few Castilian words, lending credence to the idea that they had already been visited by Spanish raiders.

Popular legend has it that Ponce de León was searching for the Fountain of Youth when he discovered Florida. However, the first mention of Ponce de León allegedly searching for water to cure his aging (he was only 40) came after his death, more than twenty years after his voyage of discovery, and the first that placed the Fountain of Youth in Florida was thirty years after that. It is much more likely that Ponce de León, like other Spanish conquistadors in the Americas, was looking for gold, land to colonize and rule for Spain, and Indians to convert to Christianity or enslave.

==== Other early expeditions ====
Other Spanish voyages to Florida quickly followed Ponce de León's return. Sometime in the period from 1514 to 1516, Pedro de Salazar led an officially sanctioned raid which enslaved as many as 500 Indians along the Atlantic coast of the present-day southeastern United States. Diego Miruelo mapped what was probably Tampa Bay in 1516, Francisco Hernández de Cordova mapped most of Florida's Gulf coast to the Mississippi River in 1517, and Alonso Álvarez de Pineda sailed and mapped the central and western Gulf coast to the Yucatán Peninsula in 1519.

=== First colonization attempts ===
In 1521, Ponce de León sailed from Cuba with 200 men in two ships to establish a colony on the southwest coast of the Florida peninsula, probably near Charlotte Harbor. However, attacks by the native Calusa drove the colonists away in July 1521. During a skirmish, Ponce de León was pierced in his thigh with an arrow and he died upon the expedition's return to Havana in the first week of July, probably from an infection caused by the arrow.

In 1521, Pedro de Quejo and Francisco Gordillo enslaved 60 Indians at Winyah Bay, South Carolina. Quejo, with the backing of Lucas Vázquez de Ayllón, returned to the region in 1525, stopping at several locations between Amelia Island and the Chesapeake Bay. In 1526, de Ayllón led an expedition of some 600 people to the South Carolina coast. After scouting possible locations as far south as Ponce de Leon Inlet in Florida, the settlement of San Miguel de Gualdape was established in the vicinity of Sapelo Sound, Georgia. Disease, hunger, cold and Indian attacks led to San Miguel being abandoned after only two months. About 150 survivors returned to Spanish settlements. Dominican friars Fr. Antonio de Montesinos and Fr. Anthony de Cervantes were among the colonists. Given that at the time priests were obliged to say mass each day, it is historically safe to assert that Catholic Mass was celebrated in what is today the United States for the first time by these Dominicans, even though the specific date and location remains unclear.

=== Narváez expedition ===
In 1527, Pánfilo de Narváez left Spain with five ships and about 600 people (including the Moroccan slave Mustafa Azemmouri) on a mission to explore and to settle the coast of the Gulf of Mexico between the existing Spanish settlements in Mexico and Florida. After storms and delays, the expedition landed near Tampa Bay on April 12, 1528, already short on supplies, with about 400 people. Confused as to the location of Tampa Bay (Milanich notes that a navigation guide used by Spanish pilots at the time placed Tampa Bay some 90 miles (140 km) too far north), Narváez sent his ships in search of it while most of the expedition marched northward, supposedly to meet the ships at the bay.

Intending to find Tampa Bay, Narváez marched close to the coast, through what turned out to be a largely uninhabited territory. The expedition was forced to subsist on the rations they had brought with them until they reached the Withlacoochee River, where they finally encountered Indians. Seizing hostages, the expedition reached the Indians' village, where they found corn. Further north they were met by a chief who led them to his village on the far side of the Suwannee River. The chief, Dulchanchellin, tried to enlist the Spanish as allies against his enemies, the Apalachee.

Seizing Indians as guides, the Spaniards traveled northwest towards the Apalachee territory. Milanich suggests that the guides led the Spanish on a circuitous route through the roughest country they could find. In any case, the expedition did not find the larger Apalachee towns. By the time the expedition reached Aute, a town near the Gulf Coast, it had been under attack by Indian archers for many days. Plagued by illness, short rations, and hostile Indians, Narváez decided to sail to Mexico rather than attempt an overland march. Two hundred and forty-two men set sail on five crude rafts. All the rafts were wrecked on the Texas coast. After eight years, four survivors, including Álvar Núñez Cabeza de Vaca, reached New Spain (Mexico).

=== De Soto expedition ===
Hernando de Soto had been one of Francisco Pizarro's chief lieutenants in the Spanish conquest of the Inca Empire, and had returned to Spain a very wealthy man. He was appointed Adelantado of Florida and governor of Cuba and assembled a large expedition to 'conquer' Florida. On May 30, 1539, de Soto and his companions landed in Tampa Bay, where they found Juan Ortiz, who had been captured by the local Indians a decade earlier when he was sent ashore from a ship searching for Narváez. Ortiz passed on the Indian reports of riches, including gold, to be found in Apalachee, and de Soto set off with 550 soldiers, 200 horses, and a few priests and friars. De Soto's expedition lived off the land as it marched. De Soto followed a route further inland than that of Narváez's expedition, but the Indians remembered the earlier disruptions caused by the Spanish and were wary when not outright hostile. De Soto seized Indians to serve as guides and porters.

The expedition reached Apalachee in October and settled into the chief Apalachee town of Anhaica for the winter, where they found large quantities of stored food, but little gold or other riches. In the spring de Soto set out to the northeast, crossing what is now Georgia and South Carolina into North Carolina, then turned westward, crossed the Great Smoky Mountains into Tennessee, then marched south into Georgia. Turning westward again, the expedition crossed Alabama. They lost all of their baggage in a fight with Indians near Choctaw Bluff on the Alabama River, and spent the winter in Mississippi. In May 1541, the expedition crossed the Mississippi River and wandered through present-day Arkansas, Missouri and possibly Kansas before spending the winter in Oklahoma. In 1542, the expedition headed back to the Mississippi River, where de Soto died. Three hundred and ten survivors returned from the expedition in 1543.

=== Ochuse and Santa Elena ===
Although the Spanish had lost hope of finding gold and other riches in Florida, it was seen as vital to the defense of their colonies and territories in Mexico and the Caribbean. In 1559, Tristán de Luna y Arellano left Mexico with 500 soldiers and 1,000 civilians on a mission to establish colonies at Ochuse (Pensacola Bay) and Santa Elena (Port Royal Sound). The plan was to land everybody at Ochuse, with most of the colonists marching overland to Santa Elena. A hurricane struck five weeks after the fleet's arrival at the Bay of Ochuse, sinking seven of the twelve expedition ships along with the supplies that had not yet been unloaded. Expeditions into the interior failed to find adequate supplies of food. Most of the colony moved inland to Nanicapana, renamed Santa Cruz, where some food had been found, but it could not support the colony and the Spanish returned to Pensacola Bay. In response to a royal order to immediately occupy Santa Elena, Luna sent three small ships, but they were damaged in a storm and returned to Mexico. Angel de Villafañe replaced the discredited Luna in 1561, with orders to withdraw most of the colonists from Ochuse and occupy Santa Elena. Villafañe led 75 men to Santa Elena, but a tropical storm damaged his ships before they could land, forcing the expedition to return to Mexico.

== Settlement and fortification ==
The establishment of permanent settlements and fortifications in Florida by Spain was in response to the challenge posed by French Florida: French captain Jean Ribault led an expedition to Florida, and established Charlesfort on what is now Parris Island, South Carolina, in 1562. However, the French Wars of Religion prevented Ribault from returning to resupply the fort, and the men abandoned it. Two years later, René Goulaine de Laudonnière, Ribault's lieutenant on the previous voyage, set out to found a haven for Protestant Huguenot colonists in Florida. He founded Fort Caroline at what is now Jacksonville in July 1564. Once again, however, a resupplying mission by Ribault failed to arrive, threatening the colony. Some mutineers fled Fort Caroline to engage in piracy against Spanish colonies, causing alarm among the Spanish government. Laudonnière nearly abandoned the colony in 1565, but Jean Ribault finally arrived with supplies and new settlers in August.

At the same time, in response to French activities, King Philip II of Spain appointed Pedro Menéndez de Avilés Adelantado of Florida, with a commission to drive non-Spanish adventurers from all of the land from Newfoundland to St. Joseph Bay (on the north coast of the Gulf of Mexico). Menéndez de Avilés reached Florida at the same time as Ribault in 1565, and established a base at San Agustín (St. Augustine in English), the oldest continuously inhabited European-established settlement in what is now the continental United States. Menéndez de Avilés quickly set out to attack Fort Caroline, traveling overland from St. Augustine. At the same time, Ribault sailed from Fort Caroline, intending to attack St. Augustine from the sea. The French fleet, however, was pushed out to sea and decimated by a squall. Meanwhile, the Spanish overwhelmed the lightly defended Fort Caroline, sparing only the women and children. Some 25 men were able to escape. When the Spanish returned south and found the French shipwreck survivors, Menéndez de Avilés ordered all of the Huguenots executed. The location became known as Matanzas.

The 1565 marriage in St. Augustine between Luisa de Abrego, a free black domestic servant from Seville, and Miguel Rodríguez, a white Segovian conquistador, was the first known and recorded Christian marriage anywhere in what is now the continental United States.

Following the expulsion of the French, the Spanish renamed Fort Caroline Fort San Mateo (Saint Matthew). Two years later, Dominique de Gourgues recaptured the fort from the Spanish and slaughtered all of the Spanish defenders. However, he did not leave a garrison, and France would not attempt to settle in Florida again.

To fortify St. Augustine, Spaniards (along with forced labor from the Timucuan, Guale, and Apalache peoples) built the Castillo de San Marcos beginning in 1672. The first stage of construction was completed in 1695. They also built Fort Matanzas just to the south to look for enemies arriving by sea. In the eighteenth century, a free black population began to grow in St. Augustine, as Spanish Florida granted freedom to enslaved people fleeing the Thirteen Colonies. Fort Mose became another fort, populated by free black militiamen and their families, serving as a buffer between the Spanish and British.

== Missions and conflicts ==
In 1549, Father Luis de Cáncer and three other Dominicans attempted the first solely missionary expedition in la Florida. Following decades of native contact with Spanish laymen who had ignored a 1537 Papal Bull which condemned slavery in no uncertain terms, the religious order's effort was abandoned after only six weeks with de Cancer's brutal martyrdom by Tocobaga natives. His death sent shock waves through the Dominican missionary community in New Spain for many years.

In 1566, the Spanish established the colony of Santa Elena on what is now Parris Island, South Carolina. Juan Pardo led two expeditions (1566–1567 and 1567–1568) from Santa Elena as far as eastern Tennessee, establishing six temporary forts in interior. The Spanish abandoned Santa Elena and the surrounding area in 1587.

In 1586, English privateer Francis Drake plundered and burned St. Augustine, including a fortification that was under construction, while returning from raiding Santo Domingo and Cartagena in the Caribbean. His raids exposed Spain's inability to properly defend her settlements.

The Jesuits had begun establishing missions to the Native Americans in Florida in 1567, but withdrew in 1572 after hostile encounters with the natives. In 1573 Franciscans assumed responsibility for missions to the Native Americans, eventually operating dozens of missions to the Guale, Timucua and Apalachee tribes. The missions were not without conflict, and the Guale first rebelled on October 4, 1597, in what is now coastal Georgia.

The extension of the mission system also provided a military strategic advantage from British troops arriving from the North. During the hundred-plus year span of missionary expansion, disease from the Europeans had a significant impact on the natives, along with the rising power of the French and British. During the Queen Anne's War, the British destroyed most of the missions. By 1706, the missionaries abandoned their mission outposts and returned to St. Augustine.

== Period of friendship ==
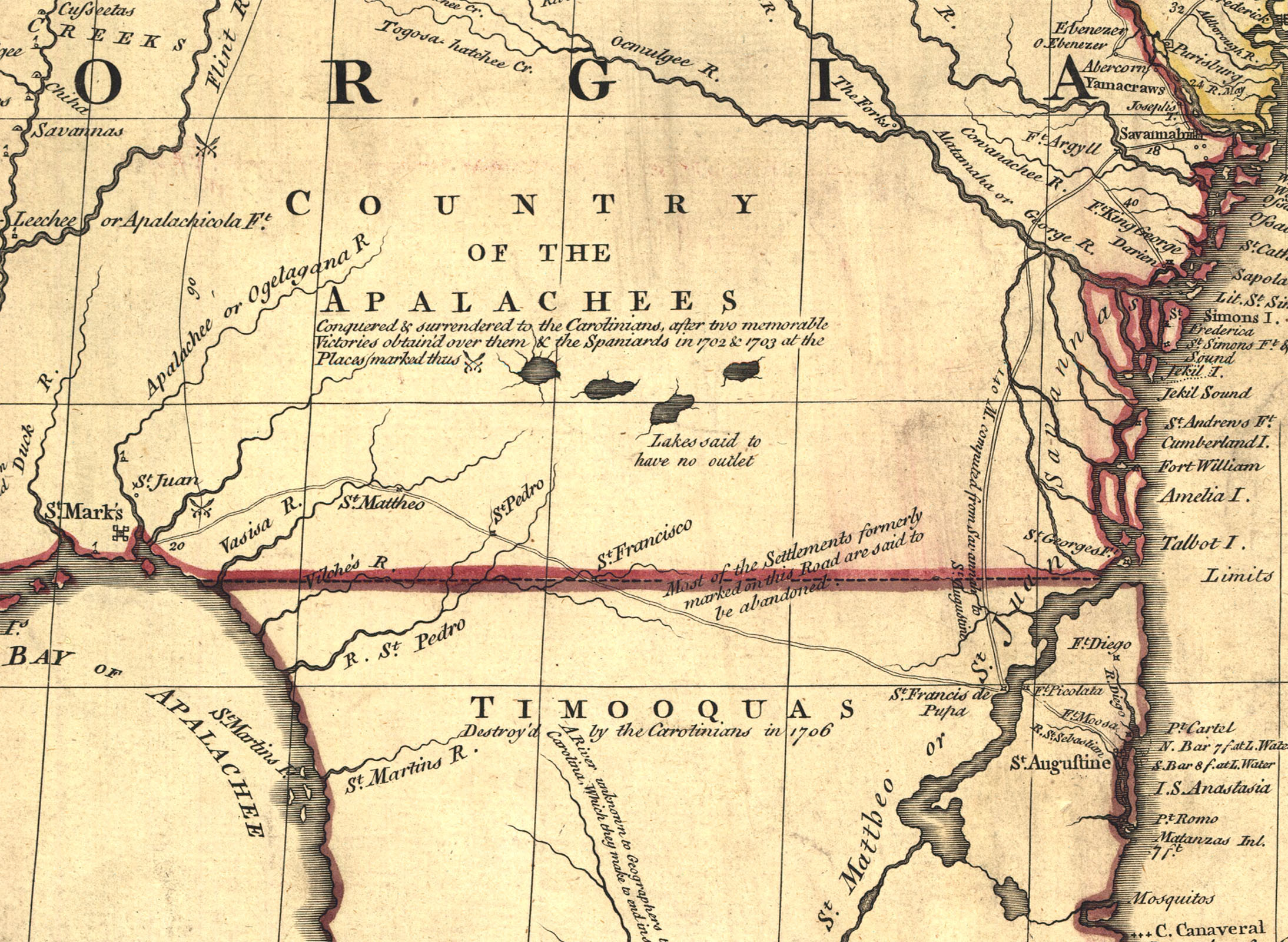
An excerpt from the British–American Mitchell Map, showing northern Spanish Florida, the old mission road from St. Augustine to St. Mark's, and text describing the Carolinian raids of 1702–1706

Spanish Governor Pedro de Ibarra worked at establishing peace with the native cultures to the South of St. Augustine. An account is recorded of his meeting with great Indian caciques (chiefs). Ybarra (Ibarra) in 1605 sent Álvaro Mexía, a cartographer, on a mission further South to meet and develop diplomatic ties with the Ais Indian nation, and to make a map of the region. His mission was successful.

In February 1647, the Apalachee revolted. The revolt changed the relationship between Spanish authorities and the Apalachee. Following the revolt, Apalachee men were forced to work on public projects in St. Augustine or on Spanish-owned ranches. In 1656, the Timucua rebelled, disrupting the Spanish missions in Florida. This also affected the ranches and food supplies for St. Augustine.

The economy of Spanish Florida diversified during the 17th century, with cattle ranching playing a major role. Throughout the 17th century, colonists from the Carolina and Virginia colonies gradually pushed the frontier of Spanish Florida south. In the early 18th century, French settlements along the Mississippi River and Gulf Coast encroached on the western borders of the Spanish claim.

Starting in 1680, Carolina colonists and their Native American allies repeatedly attacked Spanish mission villages and St. Augustine, burning missions and killing or kidnapping the Indian population. In 1702, James Moore led an army of colonists and a Native American force of Yamasee, Tallapoosa, Alabama, and other Creek warriors under the Yamasee chief Arratommakaw. The army attacked and razed the town of St. Augustine, but could not gain control of the fort. Moore, in 1704, made a series of raids into the Apalachee Province of Florida, looting and destroying most of the remaining Spanish missions and killing or enslaving most of the Indian population. By 1707, the few surviving Indians had fled to Spanish St. Augustine and Pensacola, or French Mobile. Some of the Native Americans captured by Moore's army were resettled along the Savannah and the Ocmulgee rivers in Georgia.

At the end of the 17th century and early in the 18th century, the Spanish attempted to block French expansion from Louisiana along the Gulf coast towards Florida. In 1696, they founded the Presidio Santa Maria de Galve on Pensacola Bay near the present-day site of Fort Barrancas at Naval Air Station Pensacola, followed by the foundation of the Presidio Bahía San José de Valladares on St. Joseph Bay in 1701. These presidios were under the direct authority of the Viceroy of New Spain rather than the governor of Spanish Florida in St. Augustine. The French captured Bahía San José de Valladares in 1718, and Santa Maria de Galve in 1719. After losing Santa Maria de Galve, the Spanish established the Presidio Bahía San José de Nueva Asturias on St. Joseph Point in 1719, as well as a fort at the mouth of the Apalachicola River. Spain regained the Pensacola Bay area from the French in 1722 and established the Presidio Isla Santa Rosa Punta de Siguenza on Santa Rosa Island, abandoning the Bahía San José site. After Isla Santa Rosa Punta de Siguenza was destroyed by a hurricane in 1752, the Spanish relocated to the Presidio San Miguel de Panzacola, which developed into the city of Pensacola. In 1718, the Spanish founded the Presidio San Marcos de Apalachee at the existing port of San Marcos, under the authority of the governor in St. Augustine. This presidio developed into the town of St. Marks.

Some Spanish men married or had unions with Pensacola, Creek, or African women, both slave and free, and their descendants created a mixed-race population of mestizos and mulattos. The Spanish encouraged slaves from the southern colonies to come to Florida as a refuge, promising freedom in exchange for conversion to Catholicism. In 1693, King Charles II of Spain issued a royal proclamation freeing all slaves who fled to Spanish Florida and accepted conversion and baptism. Most went to the area around St. Augustine, but escaped slaves also reached Pensacola. St. Augustine had mustered an all-black militia unit defending Spain as early as 1683.

During the 18th century, the Native American peoples who would become the Seminoles began their migration to Florida, which had been largely depopulated by Carolinian and Yamasee slave raids. Carolina's power was damaged, and the colony nearly destroyed, during the Yamasee War of 1715–1717; after which the Native American slave trade was radically reformed.

== Possession by Britain ==
The expanded West Florida territory in 1767

In 1763, Spain traded Florida to Great Britain in exchange for control of Havana, Cuba, and Manila in the Philippines, which had been captured by the British during the Seven Years' War. As Britain had defeated France in the war, it took over all of French Louisiana east of the Mississippi River, except for New Orleans. Finding this new territory too vast to govern as a single unit, Britain divided the southernmost areas into two territories separated by the Apalachicola River: East Florida (the peninsula) and West Florida (the panhandle).

The Spanish officials, soldiers and settlers departed following the signing of the treaty, with the entirety of St Augustine emigrating to Cuba.

The British soon began an aggressive recruiting policy to attract colonists to the area, offering free land and backing for export-oriented businesses. In 1767, the British moved the northern boundary of West Florida to a line extending from the mouth of the Yazoo River east to the Chattahoochee River (32° 28′ north latitude),^{p 2} consisting of approximately the lower third of the present states of Mississippi and Alabama, including the valuable Natchez District.

During this time, Creek Indians began to migrate into Florida, leading to the formation of the Seminole tribe. The aboriginal peoples of Florida had been devastated by war and disease, and it is thought most of the survivors accompanied the Spanish settlers when they left for other colonies (mostly French) in 1763. This left wide expanses of territory open to the Lower Creeks, who had been in conflict with the Upper Creeks of Alabama for years. The Seminole originally occupied the wooded areas of northern Florida. Under pressure from colonists and the United States Army in the Seminole Wars, they migrated into central and southern Florida, to the Everglades. Many of their descendants live in this area today as one of the two federally recognized Seminole tribes in the state.

Britain retained control over East Florida during the American Revolutionary War, but the Spanish, by that time allied with the French who were at war with Britain, recaptured most of West Florida. At the end of the war the Peace of Paris (1783) treaties (between the Kingdoms of Great Britain and Spain) ceded all of East and West Florida to Spanish control, though without specifying the boundaries.

== Second Spanish Period ==
=== Boundary disputes ===
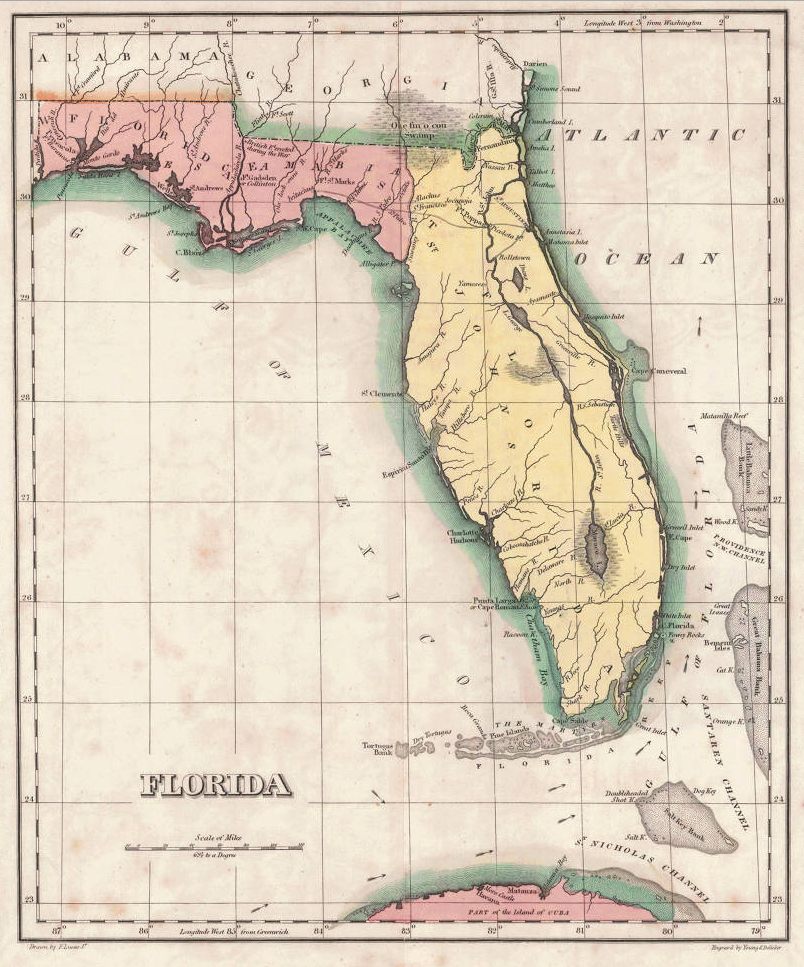
Under Spanish rule, Florida was divided by the natural separation of the Suwannee River into West Florida and East Florida. Map: Carey & Lea, 1822.

Spain gained possession of West Florida and regained East Florida from Britain in the Peace of Paris of 1783, and continued the British practice of governing the Floridas as separate territories: West Florida and East Florida. When Spain acquired West Florida in 1783, the eastern British boundary was the Apalachicola River, but Spain moved it eastward to the Suwannee River in 1785. The purpose was to transfer San Marcos and the district of Apalachee from East Florida to West Florida.

After American independence, the lack of specified boundaries led to a border dispute with the newly formed United States, known as the West Florida Controversy. The two 1783 treaties that ended the American Revolutionary War had differences in boundaries. The Treaty of Paris between Britain and the United States specified the boundary between West Florida and the newly independent U.S. at 31°. However, in the companion Peace of Paris between Britain and Spain, West Florida was ceded to Spain without its boundaries being specified. The Spanish government insisted that its claim extended fully to the 1767 boundary at 32° 28′.^{p 2} The British line at 32° 28′ was close to Spain's old claim of 32° 30′, which can be justified by referring to the principle of actual possession adopted by Spain and England in the 1670 Treaty of Madrid. The now independent United States insisted that the boundary was at 31°, as specified in its Treaty of Paris with Britain.

After American independence, Spain claimed far more land than the old British West Florida, including the east side of the Mississippi River north to the Ohio and Tennessee rivers. This expanded claim was based on Spain's successful military operations against the British in the region during the war. Spain occupied or built several forts north of the old British West Florida border, including Fort Confederación, Fort Nogales (at present-day Vicksburg), and Fort San Fernando (at present-day Memphis). Spain tried to settle the dispute quickly, but the U.S. delayed, knowing that time was on its side. By Pinckney's Treaty of 1795 with the United States, Spain recognized the 31st parallel as the border, ending the first West Florida Controversy. Andrew Ellicott surveyed this parallel in 1797, as the border between the United States and Spanish territories. In 1798, Ellicott reported to the government that four American generals were receiving pensions from Spain, including General James Wilkinson.

=== Seminoles, slave raids, and uprisings ===
Spain, beset with independence movements in its other colonies, could not settle or adequately govern Florida by the turn of the 19th century, with real control limited to the immediate vicinity of St. Augustine, Pensacola, and a few small towns and forts scattered across the north of the territory. Tension and hostility between Seminoles and American settlers living in neighboring Georgia and over the Florida border grew steadily.

Though Spain officially ended its policy of welcoming people fleeing from slavery in other colonies and countries in 1790, a steady stream of such people continued to cross the unguarded border from the United States and either settled near Seminole villages or established their own small settlements.American slaveholders sought to reclaim who they considered their property and organized increasingly frequent raiding parties that entered Spanish territory to attack Seminole villages and capture anyone who might be a refugee from slavery. British agents working in Florida provided arms and other assistance to the Seminoles, resulting in counter-raids across the border that sometimes required intervention by the US military.

Several local insurrections and filibuster campaigns against Spanish rule flared, some with quiet support from the U.S. government, most notably the Patriot War of East Florida of 1810–1812 led by George Mathews. At this time there were only about 500 Spanish troops in West Florida. Substantial reinforcements would not be forthcoming from mainland Spain, engaged in combat against Napoleon.

Following secret orders issued at the end of March 1814, Captain Woodbine of the Royal Marines made contact with Indians. After a meeting of various elders held aboard HMS Orpheus (1809) on May 20, weapons and other gifts were provided by the British. Woodbine was appointed as British Agent to the Creek Nations. He was advised to respect the Spanish, and to communicate this to the Creeks. (Note: 'You are most particularly enjoined on no account whatsoever to give offence to the Spaniards in East or West Florida, but advice[sic] the Chiefs to this effect') A declaration from the Chiefs of the Creek Nation to Cochrane alluded to this.

Upon receiving reports that Manrique had allowed the British to land on Spanish soil to arm natives at war with the United States, and had not intervened, Jackson's letter to Manrique dated July 12 warned of "disagreeable consequences" if this intelligence was true.

The subsequent arrival in August 1814 of Edward Nicolls on the Gulf Coast during the War of 1812 escalated tensions. The officer commanding the Royal Navy flotilla had been made, by Captain General Juan Ruiz de Apodaca, to promise not to land in Florida without being requested to do so. This was clearly ignored by Nicolls, (Note: Letter from Nicolls to Cochrane, sent from Nassau, dated July 27. 'I then told him [Apodaca] I should debark[sic] and attack the Americans, wherever I found them which he did not gainsay.') notwithstanding strict orders from Cochrane on July 4 to respect Spanish neutrality. (Note: Letter from Cochrane to Nicolls '4th. While the spanish Government remains at Peace with the United States, you must be cautious (excepting in self defence) not to commit any act of hostility against the United States within the Spanish Boundary, or in any other way infringe on the neutrality of the Spanish territory') Nonetheless, when Nicolls arrived at Prospect Bluff, Florida, in August, the Spanish Governor of West Florida, at Pensacola, Don Mateo González Manrique, aware of the potential threat the Americans posed to Florida, requested the redeployment of British forces to Pensacola. Manrique not only permitted Captain Woodbine to land arms and provisions for the Indians, but also requested Woodbine's assistance in strengthening the town's defenses to meet the anticipated American attack. Nicolls and about 150 Royal Marines were observed to disembark at Pensacola on August 26, at the request of Manrique, fearful of an attack, based upon a letter to Jackson dated September 2.

A consequence of this was that General Jackson initiated an embargo on foodstuffs being sent to Pensacola. Whilst this impacted the local population, where provisions were in short supply, the intention was to hamper British use of the town as a base of operations and logistical hub. Whilst the embargo is believed to have been lifted, the gulf coast was now a war zone, as the British commenced their campaign against New Orleans. Jackson's reply to Manrique of December 23, 1814 suggests that there were food shortages that month. The newly appointed commander of the Pensacola garrison, Francisco San Maxent, made a formal complaint to Manrique on December 31 that his men have no rations, and with due respect asks him what he should communicate to his officers.

Nicolls participated in an unsuccessful land and naval attack on Fort Bowyer on September 15. In the fighting, Nicolls was wounded severely three times, and he lost the use of his right eye for life. The taking of Pensacola in November by an American force under Andrew Jackson forced Nicolls to retreat to the Apalachicola River with freed and escaped slaves from Pensacola. There, Nicolls regrouped at Prospect Bluff, and rallied Indians and refugee ex-slaves living free in Florida, recruiting the latter into his detached unit of the Corps of Colonial Marines. Upon leaving Pensacola on November 9, Nicolls took with him a large proportion of the Spanish garrison, 363 soldiers, who did not return to Pensacola until 1815. (Note: Cochrane's letter to Manrique, composed on the Tonnant, off Mobile February 10, 1815 does state: 'Sorry that it has not been in my power to bring back the Spanish Soldiers from that vicinity ...., but in a few days I will dedicate a Sloop of War Solely to that purpose' The original transcript is stored within: Letters from Commander-in-Chief, North America: 1815, nos. 1–126 (ADM 1/508)) (Note: Letter from Admiral Cochrane to Admiral Malcolm composed on the Tonnant, off Mobile 17 February 1815 'The Spanish Governor at Pensacola, having requested that a part of the Spanish Troops removed to the Bluff, when the American Army attacked ...you will send a troop ship to Appalachicola to receive them on board, and land them in the harbour of Pensacola'. Archive reference ADM 1/508 folios 556–561, which has been reproduced in its entirety in a secondary source.)

The detachment of fugitive slaves in Florida, which had grown to about 400 men, (Note: Enclosure 6b to Erving has the testimony of a Royal Marine deserter from the Fort, sworn at Mobile on 9 May 1815, advising "the British left, with the Indians, between them three and four hundred negroes, taken from the United States, principally Louisiana.) (Note: Enclosure 7 to Erving. Letter from General Gaines dated 22 May 1815 "P.S. I learn that Nicholls[sic] ..is still at Appalachicola, and that he has 900 Indians and 450 negroes under arms.) (Note: Letter from Admiral Cochrane to General Lambert dated 3 February 1815 refers to "a coloured corps has been organised of from 300–400 men" which is commanded by Nicolls. This is within WO 1/143 folio 55. A copy is also contained within: Letters from Commander-in-Chief, North America: 1815, nos. 1–126 (ADM 1/508)) was paid off and disbanded when the British post was evacuated at the end of the war. A small number of men went to Bermuda with the British as part of a refugee group, rejoining the main body of Colonial Marines. (Note: Enclosure 8 to Erving. Memorandum dated 21 May 1815 "a few that were shipped to the island of Trinidad, in His Majesty's Ship, The Levant; and such as have enlisted in the Colonial Marines.") Others from the Florida unit remained in settlements around the Fort which had become a symbol of slave insurrection. Southern plantation owners dubbed it "Negro Fort", and considered the presence of a group of armed fugitive slaves, even in a remote and sparsely populated area of Spanish Florida, an unacceptable danger. It was destroyed in a river attack by the United States in 1816.

In 1817, a confused attack by a motley force of American and Scottish adventurers, Latin American revolutionaries, and pirates from Texas on Fernandina, temporarily claimed the whole of Amelia Island for the revolutionary republic of Mexico (not yet independent) for several months before U.S. forces retook the island and held it "in trust" for Spain until they could "properly police and govern it". U.S. Secretary of State John Quincy Adams called on Spain to gain control of Florida, calling the territory "a derelict open to the occupancy of every enemy, civilized or savage, of the United States, and serving no other earthly purpose than as a post of annoyance to them."

=== Transfer to American control ===
The United States Army led increasingly frequent incursions against the Seminoles in western Florida, most notably during an 1817–1818 semi-authorized campaign led by Andrew Jackson that became known as the First Seminole War. During the conflict, Jackson occupied Pensacola, leading to protests from Spain until it was returned to Spanish control several weeks later. By 1819, the United States effectively controlled much of the Florida panhandle, and Spain was willing to negotiate a transfer of the entire territory. To facilitate a more cordial relationship with the Spanish, the recent issues of slave insurrection were portrayed as attributable to perfidious British influences during the War of 1812. (Note: Letter from John Quincy Adams to George W. Erving, United States Ambassador to Spain dated December 12, 1818. 'To this letter are annexed fourteen documents, the greater part of which consist of remonstrations, addressed during the late war between the United States and Great Britain to British officers, against their continual violations of the neutrality of the Spanish territory.') The Adams–Onís Treaty was signed between the United States and Spain on February 22, 1819, and took effect on July 17, 1821. According to the terms of the treaty, the United States acquired Florida and all Spanish claim to the Oregon Country. In exchange, the U.S. renounced all its claims to Texas and agreed to pay all Spanish debts to American citizens, which totaled about $5 million. Before the United States took possession of Florida, hundreds of Black Seminoles and others sailed from Cape Florida to the Bahamas to avoid being returned to bondage.

== Notable persons ==
- Martín de Argüelles (1566–1630), First white child (criollo) known to have been born in what is now the contiguous United States. His birthplace was St. Augustine, Florida.
- Luis Cáncer, Dominican priest
- Juan de Ayala y Escobar, governor of Spanish Florida (1716–1718) and a resident of that province.
- Hernando de Escalante Fontaneda, Spanish shipwreck survivor who lived among the Native Americans of Florida for 17 years.
- Joseph Marion Hernández (1788–1857), Floridano who served as the first delegate from the Florida Territory. He was also the first Hispanic American to serve in the United States Congress and a member of the Whig Party (1822–1823)
- Pedro Benedit Horruytiner, interim co-governor of Spanish Florida (1646–1648) and governor of Spanish Florida (1651–1654). A resident of that province, his house and library are still preserved in Saint Augustine.
- Francisco Menéndez Márquez, interim co-governor of Spanish Florida (1646–1648), and the founder of the largest cattle ranching enterprise in Florida.
- Tomás Menéndez Márquez (1643–1706), official in the government of Spanish Florida, and owner, with his brothers, of the largest ranch in Spanish Florida.
- Nicolás Ponce de León II, acting governor of Spanish Florida (1663 – 1664, and 1673 – 1675) who was a native of Saint Augustine.
- Eligio de la Puente (1724–1781), Floridano who held various public offices in St. Augustine, Florida and in Havana, Cuba during the 18th century.
- Agustín V. Zamorano (1798–1842), Floridano who served as governor of Alta California (1832–1833).

== See also ==
- European colonization of the Americas
- Floridanos
- Spanish Indians
- History of Florida
- List of colonial governors of Florida
- Society in the Spanish Colonial Americas
- Spanish Texas

== Notes and citations ==
Notes

Citations

Bibliography

- Bassett, John Spencer, ed. (1969) [1927]. Correspondence of Andrew Jackson. Vol. II: May 1, 1814 to December 31, 1819. Washington, D.C.: Carnegie Institution of Washington. OCLC 1082121859.
- Boyd, Mark F. (1937). "Events at Prospect Bluff on the Apalachicola River, 1808-1818". Florida Historical Society. 16 (2): 55–96.
- De Conde, Alexander (1963). A History of American Foreign Policy. Scribner. ISBN 978-0-68-415280-6.
- Forbes, John (1979). Coker, William S. (ed.). John Forbes' Description of the Spanish Floridas. 1804. Translated by Vicki D. Butt, Joyce Lee Durbin, Maria del Carmen McDonald, Mary Ellen West, and William S. Coker. Pensacola, Florida: Perdido Bay Press. ISBN 0933776020. OCLC 4858053.
- Geggus, David Patrick (1997). "Slavery, War, and Revolution in the Greater Caribbean, 1789–1815". In Gaspar, David Barry; Geggus, David Patrick (eds.). A Turbulent Time. The French Revolution and the Greater Caribbean. Indiana University Press. pp. 1–50. ISBN 978-0-25-333247-9.
- Hughes, Christine F.; Brodine, Charles E., eds. (2023). The Naval War of 1812: A Documentary History, Vol. 4. Washington: Naval Historical Center (GPO). ISBN 978-1-943604-36-4.
- Landers, Jane G. (2010). Atlantic Creoles in the Age of Revolutions. Cambridge, Massachusetts: Harvard University Press. ISBN 978-0-674-05416-5.
- Millett, Nathaniel (2013). The Maroons of Prospect Bluff and Their Quest for Freedom in the Atlantic World. University Press of Florida. ISBN 9780813044545.
- Morris, Michael (2003). "Dreams of Glory, Schemes of Empire: The Plan to Liberate Spanish Florida". Georgia Historical Quarterly. 87 (1): 1.
- Patrick, Rembert W. (1954). Florida fiasco : rampant rebels on the Georgia-Florida border, 1810–1815. Athens: University of Georgia Press. ISBN 9780820335490.
- Smith, Gene Allen (2013). The Slaves' Gamble: Choosing Sides in the War of 1812. Palgrave Macmillan. ISBN 978-0-23-034208-8.
- Sugden, John (January 1982). "The Southern Indians in the War of 1812: The Closing Phase". Florida Historical Quarterly. 60 (3): 300. JSTOR 30146793.
- Tebeau, Charlton (1980). A History of Florida. Rev. Ed. University of Miami Press. ISBN 0-87024-303-9.
- American State Papers: Foreign Relations 1815–1822. Vol. 4. Washington: Gales & Seaton. 1834.
- "Documents Relating to Colonel Edward Nicholls and Captain George Woodbine in Pensacola, 1814". Florida Historical Quarterly. The Greenslade Papers: 51–54. July 1931.
