= García de Nodal expedition =

1619 Spanish exploration

The García de Nodal expedition was chartered in 1619 by King Philip III of Spain to reconnoiter the passage between the Atlantic and Pacific oceans, rounding Cape Horn, south of Tierra del Fuego, just discovered by the Dutch merchants Jacob Le Maire and Willem Schouten. It was a successful expedition, as all goals were reached. In addition, neither lives nor ships were lost and the whole was done in a small amount of time.

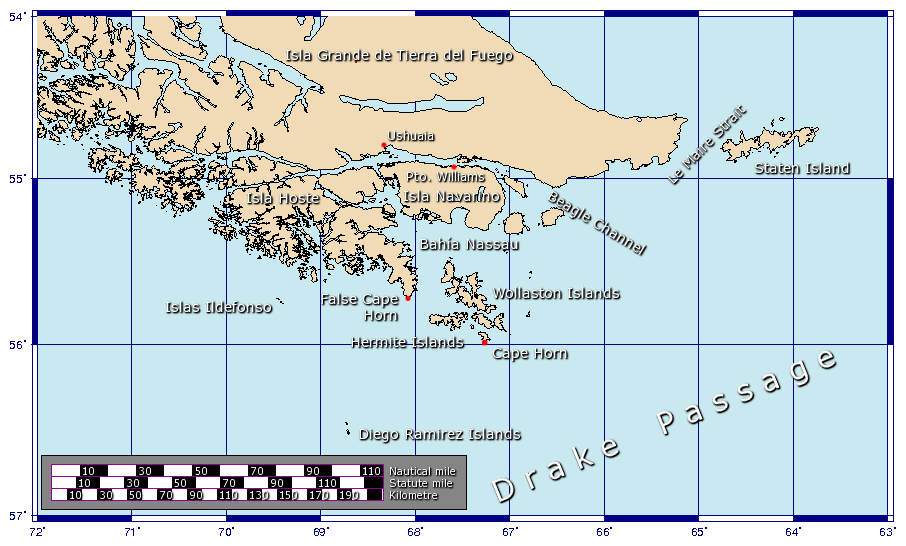
Southeastern Tierra del Fuego, including Strait of Le Maire, Cape Horn and Diego Ramirez Islands. The easternmost tip of Tierra del Fuego main island (Isla Grande de Tierra de Fuego) is the Cape San Diego, so named by the Garcia de Nodal brothers

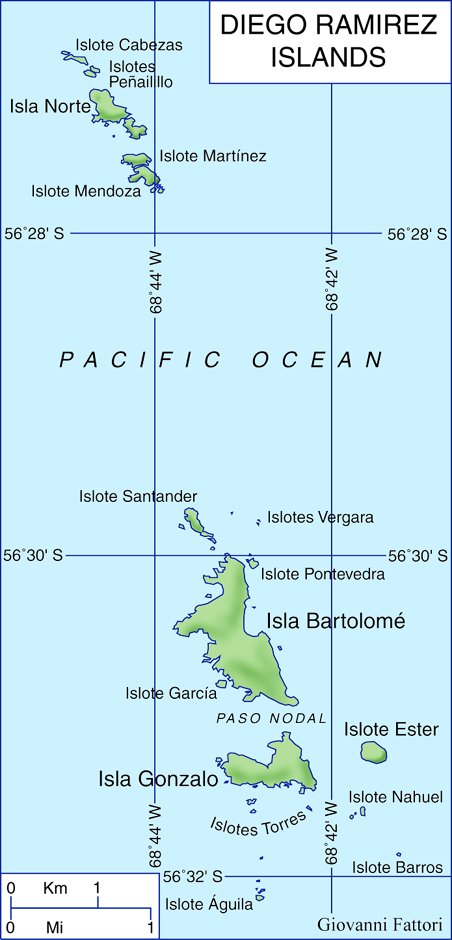
Map of Diego Ramirez Islands

== Background ==
The García de Nodal expedition was crucial to the Spanish Empire. The discovery of a route from the Atlantic Ocean to the Pacific, an alternative to the Strait of Magellan, dramatically changed the Spanish approach to the management of the southernmost regions of America, which were already disturbed by Drake’s unexpected emergence in the Pacific through the Strait in 1578.

The expedition was led by the brothers Bartolomé and Gonzalo García de Nodal, with the cosmographer Diego Ramírez de Arellano Chamás serving as pilot (chief navigator). Two vessels of similar construction were used in the expedition to prevent one ship of having to wait for the other when sailing, a common hindrance in others expeditions of the time.

The expedition sailed from Lisbon, Portugal (which was by then united to Spain in the crown of Philip II) on September 27, 1618, and in January 1619, they entered the strait between Tierra del Fuego and Isla de los Estados which they called Estrecho de San Vicente (now known as Strait of Le Maire). The following weeks were spent meticulously exploring and naming the southern shores of Tierra del Fuego and its southern islands including Cape Horn, which they named Cabo San Ildefonso. Next the expedition sailed south to 58º30'S, discovering the Diego Ramirez Islands and going farther south into the Drake Passage. They then turned north into the Pacific Ocean and skillfully entered the Strait of Magellan, on February 25, from the west in their first attempt. They passed into the Atlantic on March 13, and they returned to Spain on July 7, 1619.

== Results and evaluation ==
As a result of their expedition they provided the Spanish Casa de Contratación with invaluable data and maps that were kept secret for centuries.

In the annals of Cape Horn exploration, this must rank as one of the most professional expeditions, particularly when seen against the standards of the age in which it took place, and it would be nice to report the two brothers had many years to enjoy their justly deserved fame. Sadly both perished on 5th September 1622 when a hurricane struck a fleet returning from Havana to Spain, and their respective commands were lost. However, their signature rightly remains on Cape Horn through the names of many points, rocks and the most prominent peak on the Brunswick Peninsula. Appropriately they are also remembered in the Diego Ramirez group, where the two main islands are called after the brothers, the northern one is Bartolomé and the southern, Gonzalo. The mile-wide channel between is known as Canal Nodales [or Paso Nodal]. The Nodals proved that Schouten's account was correct and there was indeed a serious threat to the Spanish South American colonies. They had also found an alternative route for their ships but the Spanish government took no action on the Nodals' report then or later.

== Death of Nodal ==
Nodal was among those killed when the Nuestra Señora de Atocha was sunk by a hurricane off the coast of Florida in 1622.

== Achievements ==
The achievements of the Garcia de Nodal expedition include:

- The first circumnavigation of Tierra del Fuego including a thorough survey of its coasts.
- The discovery of the Diego Ramírez Islands (for one and a half centuries the southernmost land reached by man).
- The first navigation south into the Drake Passage.
- The first European contact with southern Fuegian people.
- The second passage around Cape Horn.
- The third eastward crossing of the Strait of Magellan.

== Bibliography ==
- Oyarzun, Javier. Expediciones españolas al Estrecho de Magallanes y Tierra de Fuego. Madrid: Ediciones Cultura Hispánica ISBN 84-7232-130-4.
- Knox-Johnston, Robin. "Cape Horn. A Maritime History". London Hodder & Stoughton ISBN 0-340-41527-4
- "The Blinds Horn's Hate" by Richard Hough. 163–173
