= Isla Gonzalo =

Island of Chile

Isla Gonzalo or Isla Bote
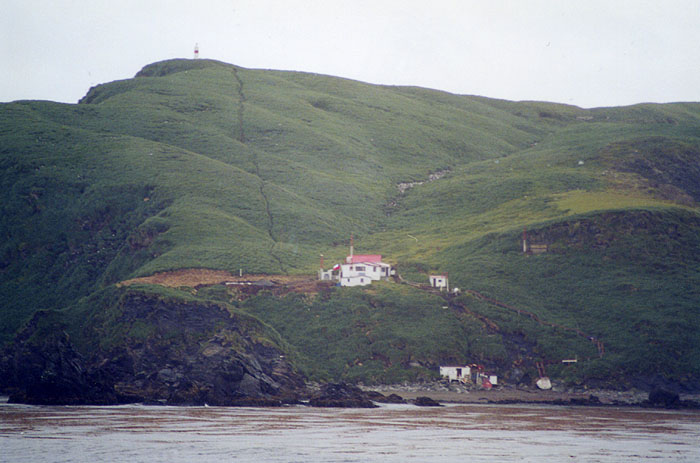
- The island with its weather station

- Location within Southern Patagonia

Geography
- Coordinates: 56°31′30″S 68°41′00″W
- Archipelago: Diego Ramírez Islands
- Area: 0.38 km^{2} (0.15 sq mi)

Administration
- Chile
- Region: Magallanes
- Province: Antártica
- Commune: Cabo de Hornos

Additional information
- NGA UFI=-883269

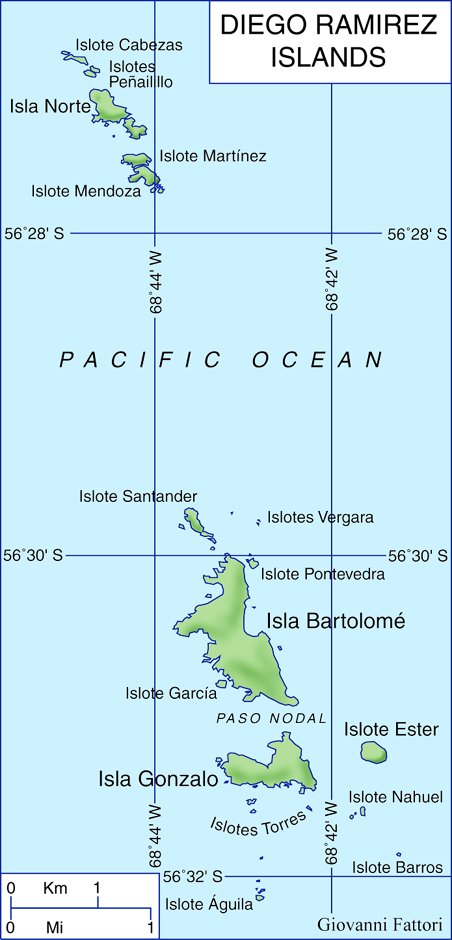

Isla Gonzalo is a subantarctic island, uninhabited except for a weather and research station operated by the Chilean Navy. With an area of 38 hectares (94 acres), it is the second largest of the Chilean Diego Ramírez Archipelago after Isla Bartolomé. The archipelago lies in the Drake Passage between the continents of South America and Antarctica. It is an important breeding site for black-browed (over 6000 pairs) and grey-headed (over 4000 pairs) albatrosses, as well as for southern giant petrels.

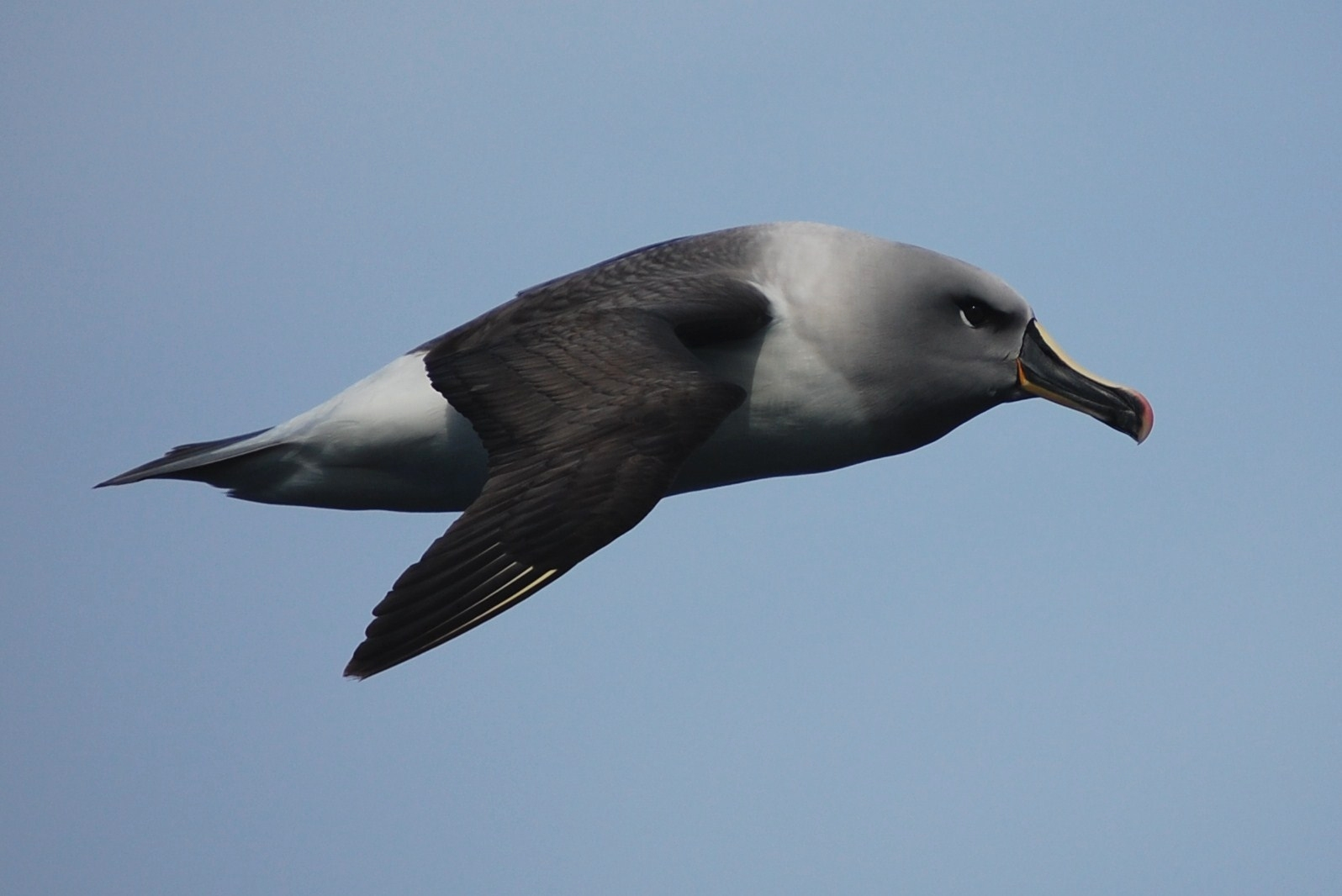
The island is an important breeding site for grey-headed albatrosses

== See also ==
- List of islands of Chile
- List of Antarctic and sub-Antarctic islands
- List of fjords, channels, sounds and straits of Chile
