= Isaac Le Maire =

Dutch entrepreneur and investor

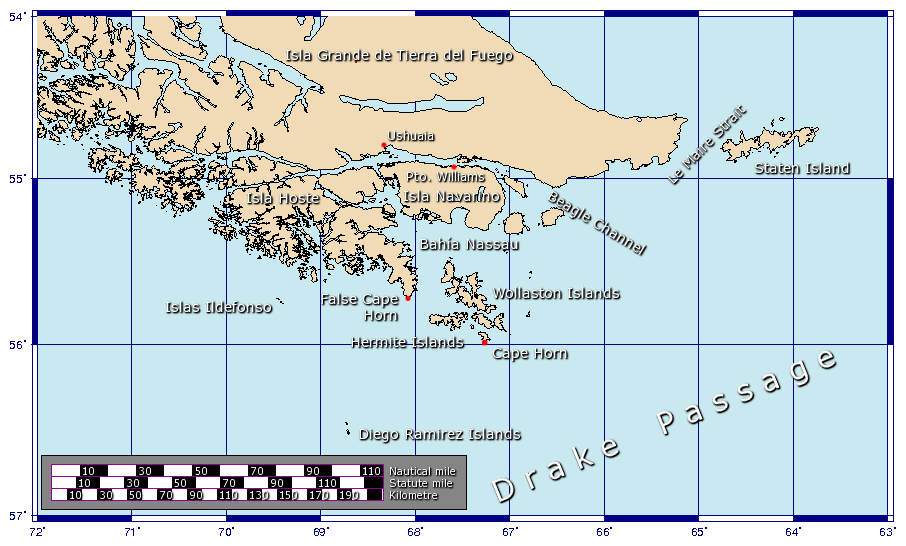
The area around Cape Horn, including the Le Maire Strait

Isaac Le Maire (c. 1559 – 20 September 1624) was an Antwerp merchant, entrepreneur and investor who moved to Amsterdam. After building an extensive trading network linking Antwerp, Amsterdam, the Baltic, Russia and southern Europe, he became one of the principal investors in the pre-VOC trading companies and one of the largest individual shareholders in the Dutch East India Company (VOC).

Following his forced resignation as a VOC director in 1605, he became the company's most persistent critic. His opposition to the VOC monopoly culminated in financing the 1615–1617 expedition of Willem Schouten and his son Jacob Le Maire, which discovered the Strait of Le Maire and rounded Cape Horn, establishing a new route between the Atlantic and Pacific Oceans.

== Early life ==
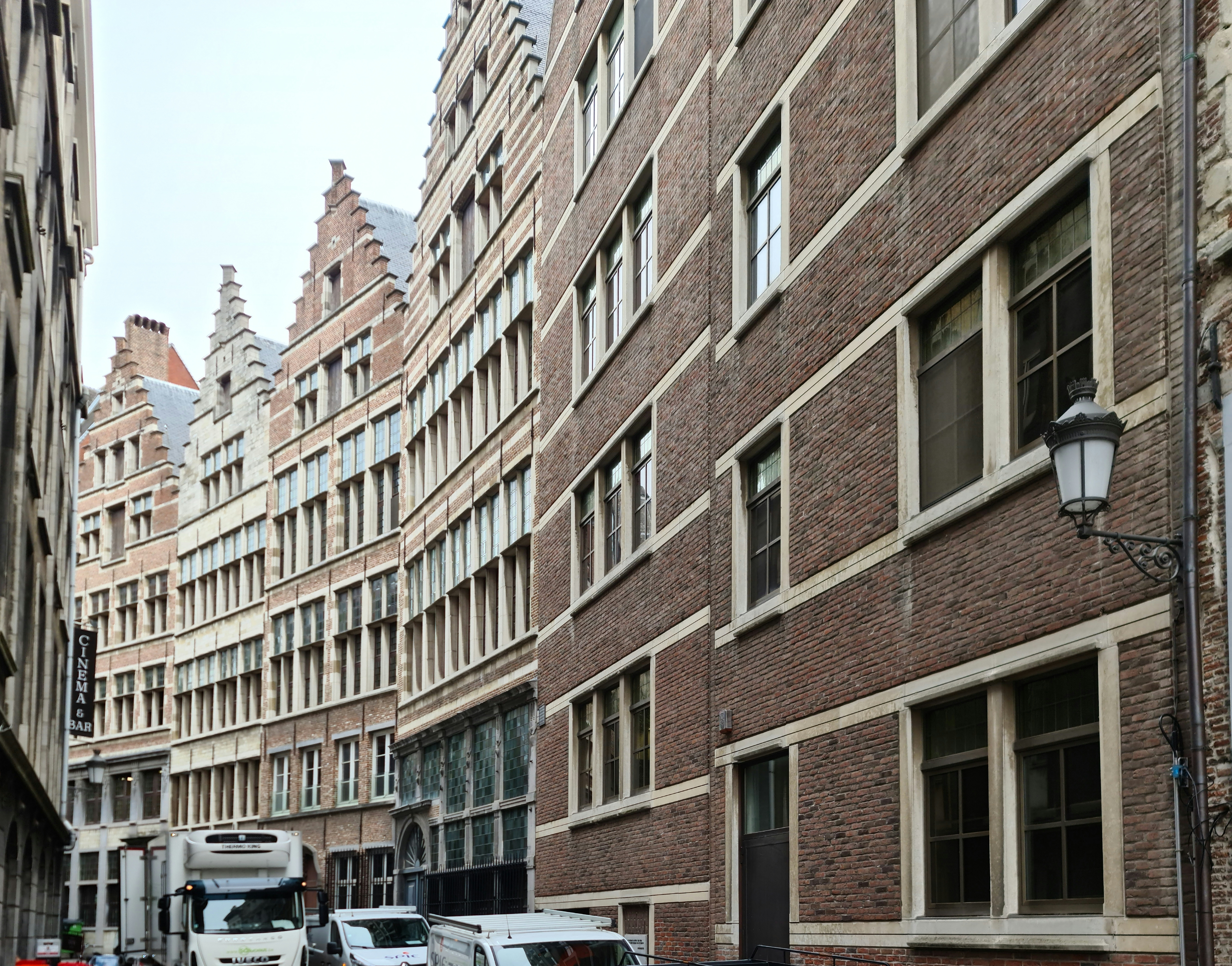
Kaasstraat, Antwerpen

Isaac Le Maire was born in 1559 in Antwerp. His father Jacques Le Maire and his uncle Adam were merchants from Tournai who became citizens of Antwerp in 1555. The Le Maire family traded with the Baltic port of Narva within a broader network of Tournai-origin merchant families, including the Van de Walle family. Isaac later became the brother-in-law of Jacques van de Walle, a trader in silk and a pioneer in the trade with Russia.

Isaac had three brothers who were also merchants. Around 1600 his brother Pieter represented Isaac in Hamburg. David settled in Livorno in 1604, and after David's death in 1617 another brother, Salomon, took over the family's business there. By 1584 he was registered in Antwerp as a wealthy grocer in de Kaasstraat, close to the Steen. At the same time he served as captain of a company of the Antwerp schutterij. In 1584 he married Maria Jacobsdochter Walraven, with whom he had two children, according to Dieusaert, born before the family's departure. After the Fall of Antwerp, he decided to move to the northern Netherlands.

=== Amsterdam ===
In 1586 the family settled in Warmoesstraat; archival records confirm the baptims of about 13 children of their children. In 1592 his name appeared for the first time in Amsterdam records as a participant in one of the city's earliest documented marine insurance policies. In the following years he expanded his activities in European maritime trade. Le Maire's career is firmly rooted in the world of prominent Flemish merchants. In 1593 his brother-in-law Jacques van de Walle encountered financial difficulties. Le Maire assumed responsibility for his outstanding debts and took over much of the family's trade with Russia, further strengthening his position in Baltic and northern European commerce. He was able to make substantial investments by securing warrant positions within his direct and extended family network.

In 1595, Le Maire entered into partnership with Dirck van Os in organizing an expedition to obtain salt in Setúbal and transport it to Arkhangelsk. Together with Van Os he formed a company for trading with Russia. They shipped Baltic grain and timber to Spain, while ships carrying leather, wax, furs, and caviar were often destined for Venice and Livorno. Their firm also traded in bills of exchange, engaged in chartering, and dealt in various forms of marine insurance. Between 1594 and 1598 he also played a major role in the fish trade between British ports and Spain. In 1597 Le Maire entrusted his brother Pieter with the sale of most of his wife's houses and properties in Antwerp, bringing the family's remaining interests there largely to an end. The economic crisis of 1597 marked a turning point in Dutch overseas commerce. As access to Iberian markets became increasingly restricted, Dutch merchants sought direct access to Asian markets, creating new opportunities for investors such as Le Maire.

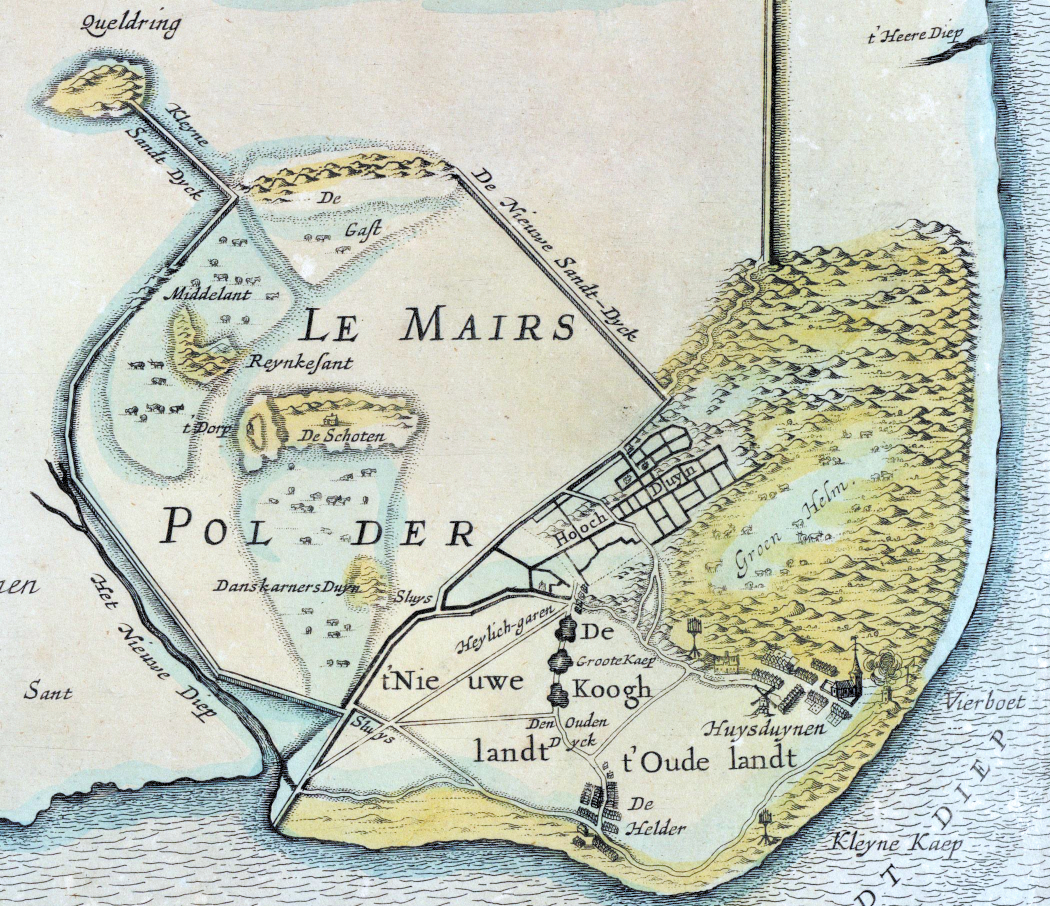
Le Mairs polder near Den Helder. Map from 1641 by Claes Jansz. Visscher. (view from the north)

In 1598 Le Maire acquired land in Egmond aan den Hoef from the debt-ridden Lamoraal II van Egmont. The following year he purchased additional property in Huisduinen, a remote coastal village strategically situated near the approaches to the Texel roadstead, where returning East Indiamen passed before on their way to Amsterdam. In 1599 Le Maire became a principal investor in the New Brabant Company. The company's expedition to Asia, which departed in December 1599, proved highly profitable and greatly increased his fortune. Previous instructions stated to avoid Portuguese ships and not to engage in any battle, except in cases of self-defense.

Although the Brabant Company had received permission to trade with China, its first expedition went no farther east than Bantam, where the company established a trading post. By the end of the sixteenth century Le Maire had become one of the leading private investors involved in the pre-VOC Asian trade. His investments in the Brabant Company, together with his established activities in the Russia trade and Baltic commerce, made him one of the most influential private entrepreneurs in Amsterdam on the eve of the foundation of the VOC.

It wasn’t until 1601 that he decided to become a burgher of Amsterdam, likely in connection with the merger of the Brabant Company and the Old Company into the First United East Indies Company. This company, in which Le Maire was a major investor, equipped eight ships for the East Indies under the command of Jacob van Heemskerk, laying the foundations for his prominent role in the establishment of the VOC in 1602. On December 4, 1602, the expedition’s insurers had a notary issue a demand for payment because several ships under Jacques Mahu had not returned within the agreed-upon three-year period. The deed indicates that Isaac and Salomon le Maire were also among the insurers involved. His activities demonstrate how leading Amsterdam merchants combined European commerce, financial services, maritime trade and strategic investments in land and overseas ventures.

== Shareholder of the Dutch East India Company ==
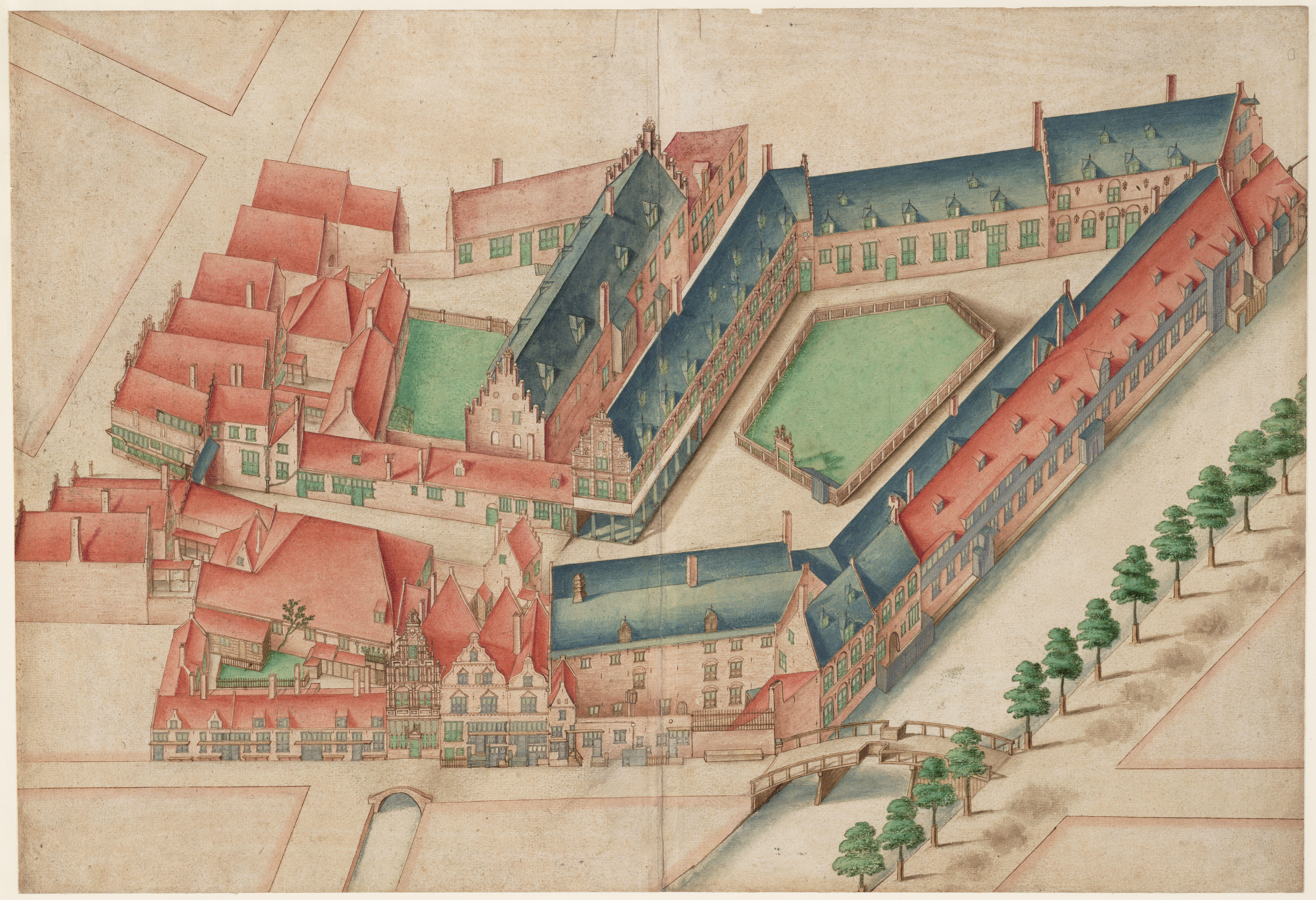
In 1606/07 Le Maire lived in part of this complex at Kalverstraat, later the Burgerweeshuis and now the Amsterdam Museum. Drawing by Balthasar Florisz. van Berckenrode (1631)

In 1602, at the insistence of Johan van Oldenbarnevelt, the Dutch trading companies active in the East Indies were united in the Dutch East India Company (VOC). Le Maire subscribed 85,000 guilders, making him the company's largest individual investor. He was one of 1,143 subscribers to the capital of the Amsterdam Chamber, among whom 301 were immigrants from the Southern Netherlands, illustrating the prominent role played by Flemish and Brabantine merchants in the foundation of the company. Le Maire became one of the Amsterdam Chamber's original directors (bewindhebbers).

Apart from its own fleets, the VOC also administered the accounts of Jacob van Heemskerck's expedition, which had been organized before the founding of the VOC in 1602. The expedition became controversial after Van Heemskerck captured the Portuguese carrack Santa Catarina near Singapore in 1603. A dispute over the administration and settlement of the expedition's accounts eventually led to Le Maire's resignation as a director in 1605. Under the terms of the settlement, he agreed not to compete directly with the company in the East Indies.

== Opposition to the VOC monopoly ==
Despite his departure from the VOC, Le Maire remained in contact with leading government officials. In early January 1606 he supplied Johan van Oldenbarnevelt with recent political, financial and maritime intelligence received through his international correspondence network, including reports on the expected arrival of Spanish silver from the Indies, monetary developments in Brussels, and the financing of Ambrogio Spinola's war effort in the Low Countries.

Le Maire also sought ways of participating in the Asian trade outside the VOC monopoly. One possibility was involvement in French attempts to establish direct trade with Asia. Such plans predated Le Maire's involvement: in 1605 Henry IV of France repeatedly asked the States General for permission to build or purchase ships in the Dutch Republic and recruit experienced captains, pilots and sailors for a French expedition to the East Indies. From at least 1608 Le Maire was involved in discussions concerning French participation in the Asian trade. The States General, however, were reluctant to permit Dutch maritime expertise and resources to be used for a potential competitor to the VOC.

In late 1608, while Henry Hudson was in Amsterdam, Le Maire approached him about undertaking a voyage in search of a northeast passage to Asia under French auspices. The Amsterdam Chamber of the VOC subsequently resumed negotiations with Hudson. On 29 December 1608 it appointed two committees to organize the expedition, and on 8 January 1609 Hudson signed a contract; the cartographer Jodocus Hondius assisted him as interpreter.

The competition over Hudson coincided with Le Maire's opposition to attempts to extend the geographical scope of the VOC monopoly. Late January 1609 he submitted a remonstrance to Johan van Oldenbarnevelt, arguing that routes and regions outside the company's existing monopoly should remain open to other merchants. Although directors of the Zeeland Chamber proposed on 14 March that the agreement with Hudson should be terminated, the Amsterdam directors nevertheless decided to proceed with the expedition. Hart connected their decision with their greater knowledge of Le Maire's activities. Hudson sailed from Amsterdam aboard the Halve Maen on 4 April 1609.

His remonstrance came amid wider discontent among Amsterdam merchants about the VOC's management and increasingly aggressive military policy. Le Maire's appeal to freedom of trade came during the negotiations for the Twelve Years' Truce, when overseas trade had become a major point of contention. In 1609 Hugo Grotius's Mare Liberum similarly defended freedom of navigation and trade, specifically challenging Portuguese claims to exclude the Dutch from trade with Asia. Later that year, Cornelis Matelieff de Jonge advocated a different course, proposing a stronger and more centralized VOC presence in Asia, with a permanent headquarters, a governor-general and an intra-Asian trading network.

Le Maire opposed the further extension of the VOC's monopoly and sought to preserve commercial opportunities and alternative routes for merchants operating outside its existing geographical scope. After leaving the VOC, he resumed his European trading activities while pursuing other opportunities outside the company's monopoly.

Le Maire meanwhile continued the French project. After losing Hudson to the VOC, he supported an expedition under Melchior van den Kerckhove, who departed on 5 May 1609 in another attempt to find a north-eastern passage. The expedition failed to find a navigable route. Efforts to establish a French East India Company continued, but ultimately failed amid mutual distrust and came to an end after the assassination of Henry IV in 1610.

In 1608 Le Maire also purchased a vacant plot at the corner of the Kalverstraat and the Heiligeweg, reflecting his continued interest in Amsterdam real estate. Records of the Bank of Amsterdam identify him as the bank's largest account holder in 1609 and again in 1611. In 1610 Le Maire also invested in an early Dutch whaling venture. The company equipped the Swemmende Leeuw and the Fortuyn for a voyage to the Cape of Good Hope; his son Jacob sailed aboard the Swemmende Leeuw, which was off the Cape on 23 July 1610.

== Speculator against the Dutch East India Company ==
In 1609, during the negotiations that led to the Twelve Years' Truce, uncertainty arose over the future of the VOC. The company's monopoly depended on the continuing war against Spain and Portugal, and some investors feared that peace would reduce its commercial advantages. Le Maire, a former director and still the largest shareholder in the Amsterdam Chamber, opposed the VOC's increasingly military policy and attempts to extend its monopoly.

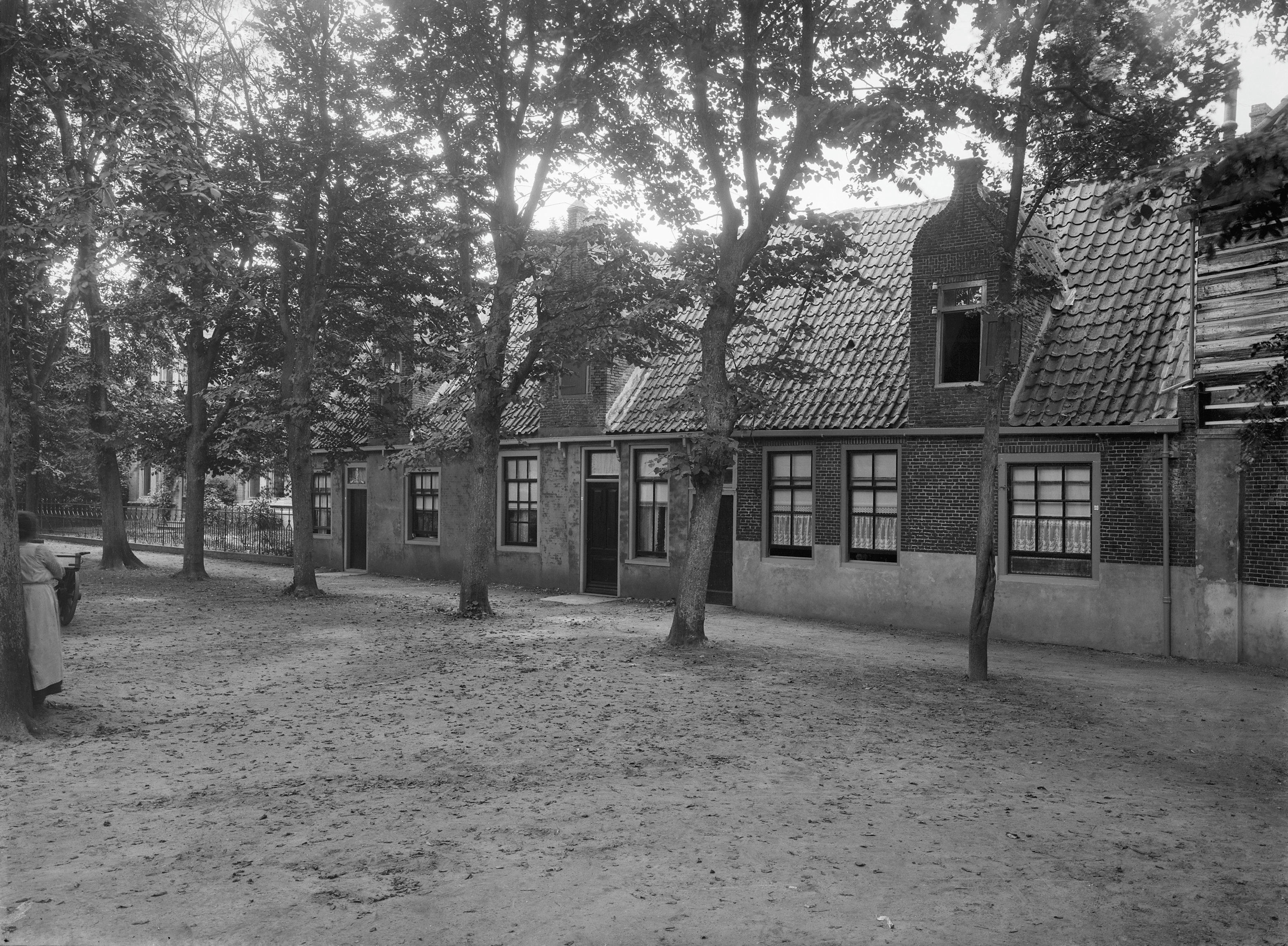
Historic houses on the Slotweg in Egmond aan den Hoef. Le Maire's house stood a short distance away.

On 11 February 1609 Le Maire and ten other merchants formed a private syndicate, later known as the Groote Compagnie, to trade VOC shares for a joint account. The syndicate sold shares through forward contracts and stood to profit from a decline in the share price. Recent research suggests that Le Maire's own motives differed from those of most of his partners. His long position in VOC shares exceeded his short position, while his opposition to the company was directed at its military policy and the scope of its monopoly.

The directors of the VOC accused the consortium of deliberately depressing the share price by spreading unfavourable rumours and petitioned the States-General of the Netherlands to restrict such transactions. Le Maire and his associates replied that the decline reflected the company's own policies rather than market manipulation and defended the freedom to trade in shares. The States-General initially declined to intervene, and the syndicate continued trading.

In early 1610 an opposing syndicate led by VOC director Albert Symonsz Joncheyn put pressure on the short sellers. On 20 March the Amsterdam Chamber announced an unprecedented 75 per cent dividend in kind, producing a squeeze that caused heavy losses and contributed to the bankruptcy of several members of Le Maire's syndicate. A ban on selling shares that the seller did not possess had been issued shortly before, but took effect only after the squeeze.

Le Maire himself was not bankrupted by the bear raid. He remained the VOC's largest Amsterdam shareholder and was able to meet his obligations. In 1611 he left Amsterdam and settled in Egmond aan den Hoef.

== Circumventing the VOC monopoly ==
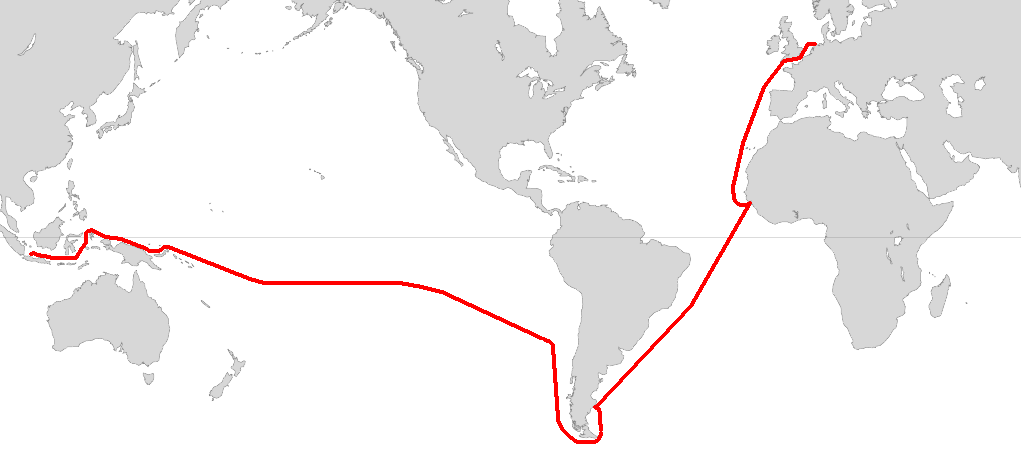
Route of the 1615–1616 voyage

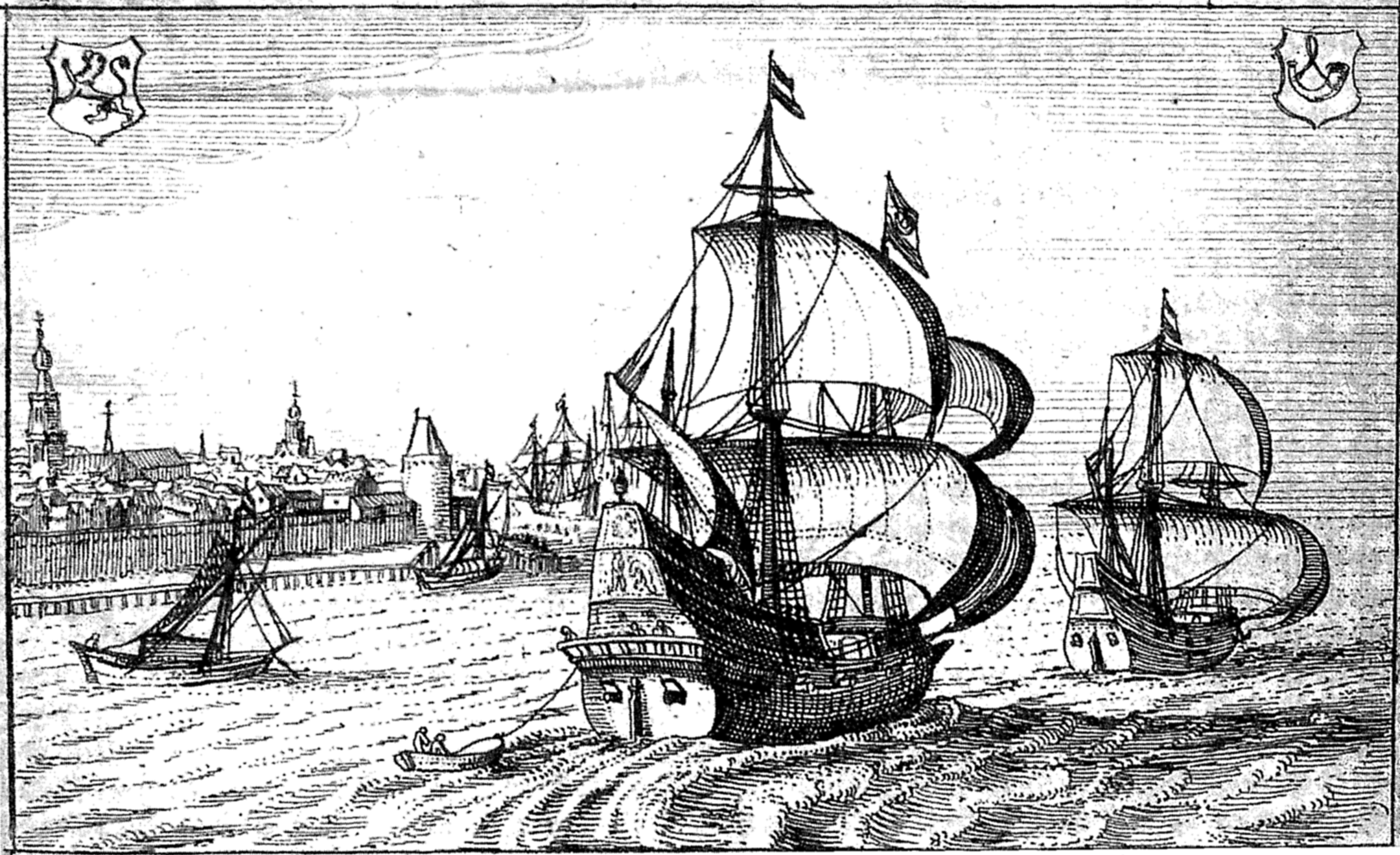
The Eendracht and the Hoorn as they set sail.

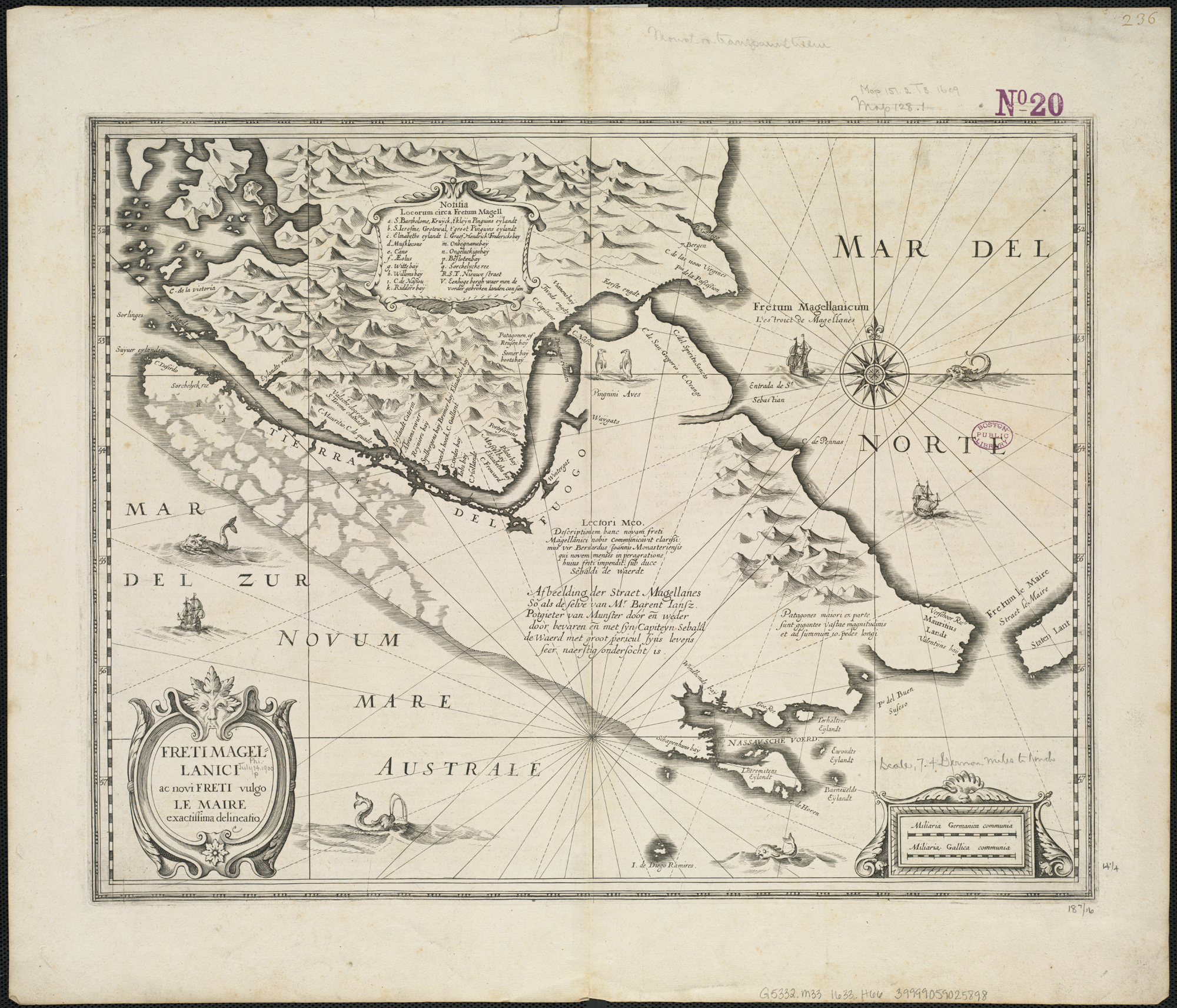
1633 map of Strait of Magellan, showing Strait Le Maire at the right, marked Fretum le Maire (Latin) and Straet Le Maire (Dutch)

Although retired from public life, Le Maire continued to seek ways of circumventing the VOC monopoly. The company's charter granted exclusive Dutch trading rights to Asia only for voyages via the Cape of Good Hope and the Strait of Magellan, then the only known sea routes to the East Indies. From contemporary travel accounts Le Maire became convinced that another passage from the Atlantic to the Pacific Ocean existed south of the Strait of Magellan.

In 1614 he founded the Australian Company to finance an expedition in search of this route, which would fall outside the geographical limits of the VOC charter. The voyage was organized in Hoorn, where two ships, the Eendracht and the Hoorn, were fitted out. The expedition was placed under the command of his son Jacob Le Maire, while Willem Schouten served as captain. The official sailing instructions expressly forbade passage through the Strait of Magellan, even if no alternative route could be found, and prohibited trade at places already occupied by the VOC.

Like many contemporaries, Le Maire also believed in the existence of a vast southern continent (Terra Australis Incognita), which might provide new commercial opportunities. Above all, however, the expedition was intended to demonstrate that the VOC monopoly could be lawfully circumvented. In confidential instructions to his son, Isaac advised him to explain to the VOC authorities in the East Indies that the expedition had not violated the company's charter because it had sailed neither via the Cape of Good Hope nor through the Strait of Magellan. If permission to trade were nevertheless refused, Jacob was instructed to seek the support of Governor-General Gerard Reynst, a former associate from the Brabant Company. To strengthen his case, he offered Reynst free transport for valuable goods destined for his son-in-law Samuel Blommaert, in the hope of securing official recognition of this interpretation of the VOC charter.

On 14 June 1615 the Eendracht and the Hoorn departed from Texel. The expedition succeeded in discovering a new passage from the Atlantic to the Pacific south of South America, now known as Cape Horn, thereby demonstrating that an alternative route to the East Indies existed beyond those specified in the VOC charter. Although the expected southern continent was not found, the expedition achieved its principal objective by establishing an alternative route to the East Indies. Isaac Le Maire's confidential instructions could not be carried out, however, because Governor-General Gerard Reynst had died before the expedition reached Asia.

After the expedition had left, the VOC became aware of its intended purpose and instructed its officials in the East Indies to seize the ships on their arrival for violating the company's charter. The Eendracht was confiscated at Jacatra, and Jacob Le Maire and Willem Schouten were sent back to the Dutch Republic to defend their case. Jacob Le Maire died during the homeward voyage near Madagascar in December 1616. Willem Schouten eventually secured the release of the expedition's journals and charts, but for many years the discoveries were associated primarily with his name rather than with Isaac Le Maire's enterprise.

== Aftermath ==
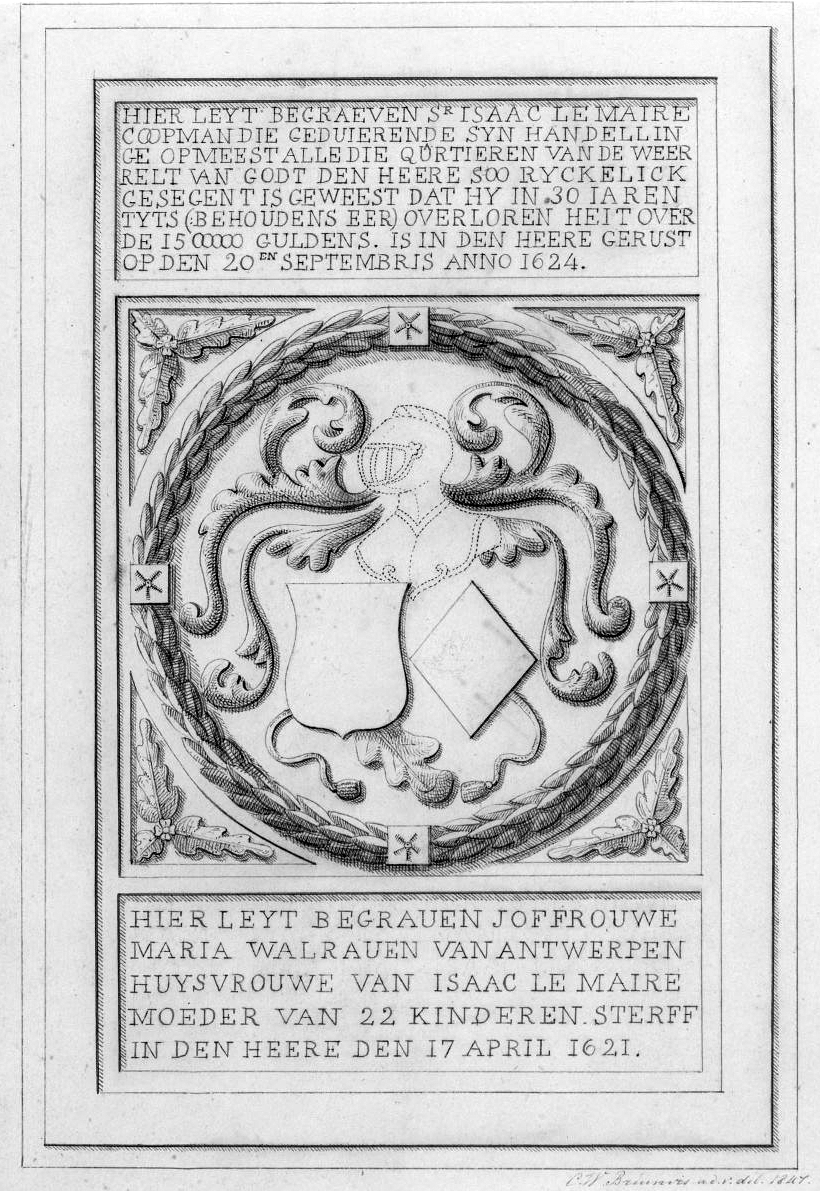
Drawing of the tombstone of Isaac le Maire and his wife

Following the return of the expedition, Le Maire spent the remainder of his life seeking legal recognition of its achievements and compensation for the seizure of the Eendracht. In 1619 the Court of Holland ruled that the VOC had unlawfully confiscated the ship. The company was ordered to return the journals, charts and other documents relating to the voyage, and to pay compensation to Le Maire. The court also confirmed that the discovery of the route around Cape Horn had not violated the geographical limits of the VOC charter. He commissioned the construction of a farmhouse on his lands along the Hoevervaart.

In 1622 Le Maire published the Spieghel der Australische Navigatie, describing the voyage of his son Jacob Le Maire and Willem Schouten, thereby securing public recognition of their discoveries. Although the judgment established the legality of the new route, it did not restore Le Maire's commercial ambitions. The Dutch West India Company, founded in 1621, received a monopoly that included the Strait of Magellan and the newly discovered route around Cape Horn, effectively closing the legal opening that Le Maire had created.

Isaac Le Maire died on 20 September 1624 and was buried in the church at Egmond-Binnen. According to the inscription on his tomb, he had lost 1.5 million guilders during the previous thirty years, "except his honour". Nine children were still living and were named in his will. His heirs continued the legal proceedings on behalf of the Australian Company, but in 1644 the States-General finally upheld the Dutch West India Company's monopoly.

== See also ==
- Financial history of the Dutch Republic

== Bibliography ==
- Barreveld, D.J. (2002) Tegen de heeren van de VOC. Isaac Le Maire en de ontdekking van Kaap Hoorn. SDU, Den Haag 2002, ISBN 90-12-09476-3.
- Dieusaert, T. (2024) Rond de Kaap. Isaac le Maire contra de VOC. Ertsberg, Deurne, ISBN 978-94-6475-029-4.
- Engelbrecht, W.A. en Herwerden, P.J. van (1945) De ontdekkingsreis van Jacob le Maire en Willem Cornelisz. Schouten in de jaren 1615-1617, Journalen, documenten en andere bescheiden. De Linschoten-Vereeniging XLIX. Den Haag: Martinus Nijhoff.
- Petram, L. (2011) The World's First Stock Exchange: How the Amsterdam Market for Dutch East India Company Shares Became a Modern Securities Market, 1602–1700
- Schoorl, H. (1968) Isaäc le Maire, koopman en bedijker Haarlem: Tjeenk Willink en zoon.
- Wijnroks, E.H. (2003) Handel tussen Rusland en de Nederlanden, 1560-1640 Hilversum: Verloren.
