= List of extreme points of Chile =

This is a list of the extreme points of Chile.

== Latitude and longitude ==
Geographic coordinates expressed in WGS 84.

=== Chile ===
- Northernmost point: Tripartite border with Bolivia and Peru in Arica and Parinacota Region near Visviri (17°29′54.0″S 69°28′6.5″W)
- Southernmost point can be either:
  - Águila Islet, Diego Ramírez Islands in Magallanes and Antártica Chilena Region 56.5375°S 68.719444°W, or, if Antarctic Chilean Territory claims are considered,
  - The South Pole in Magallanes and Antártica Chilena Region (90°S 0°W)
- Westernmost point: Motu Nui, off Easter Island (27°12′3.8″S 109°27′17.6″W)
- Easternmost point can be either:
  - Nueva Island in Magallanes and Antártica Chilena Region (55°13′10.5″S 66°24′58.0″W), or, if Antarctic Chilean Territory claims are considered,
  - The 53rd meridian west of Greenwich, over Antarctica in Magallanes and Antártica Chilena Region.

=== Mainland ===
- Northernmost point: Tripartite border with Bolivia and Peru in Arica and Parinacota Region (17°29′54.0″S 69°28′6.5″W)
- Southernmost point: Cape Froward in Magallanes and Antártica Chilena Region (53°53′47.8″S 71°17′41.4″W)
- Westernmost point: Taitao Peninsula in Aisén Region (46°43′10.0″S 75°38′57.5″W)
- Easternmost point: Off Nevados de Poquis in Antofagasta Region (22°59′31.0″S 66°58′31.7″W)

== Geographical center ==
- Chile (Including Easter Island):
  - including Antarctic territorial claims: South Pacific Ocean, 687 km WbS of Punta Arenas, Magallanes and Antártica Chilena Region, Chile (53°44′57.0″S 81°13′38.8″W)
  - excluding Antarctic territorial claims: South Pacific Ocean, 737 km SWbW of Alejandro Selkirk Island, Valparaíso Region, Chile (37°1′5.0″S 87°56′7.8″W)
- Mainland: about 8 km. east of Colbún, Maule Region, Chile (35°41′50.9″S 71°18′44.6″W)

== Altitude ==
Height referred to mean sea level.

- Highest point: Ojos del Salado in Atacama Region, 6,893 m (27°6′34.6″S 68°32′32.1″W)
- Lowest point: Pacific Ocean, 0 m

== Monuments ==
There is a monument at Playa Blanca ("White Beach"), located between Coronel and Lota in the Biobío Region, representing the middle of continental Chile north-south.

South of Punta Arenas there is another such monument, marking Chile's north-south center, including Antarctic territorial claims (photo).
