= Voyage of Le Maire and Schouten =

Expedition of. the Pacific Ocean

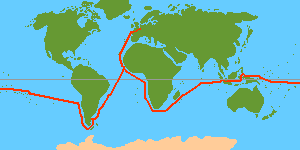
Route of the voyage of Le Maire and Schouten

The voyage of Le Maire and Schouten (1615–17) was an exploration expedition of the Pacific Ocean directed by Jacob Le Maire, and with captain Willem Schouten. Funding was provided by the Australian Company, a trading company organized in the Dutch city of Hoorn to compete with the recently founded (1602) Dutch East India Company (Vereenigde Oostindische Compagnie or VOC).

Le Maire and Schouten, with two ships, the Eendracht and the Hoorn, departed from Texel, in the Netherlands, on June 14, 1615. Their purpose was to find the supposed southern continent, which Pedro Fernández de Quirós had alluded to, and, if they did not find it, to continue on to the Dutch East Indies to trade. Because the VOCs held the Dutch exclusive right to use the route through the Strait of Magellan, Le Maire and Schouten sought a passage further south. They found the Le Maire Strait, between the Isla Grande de Tierra del Fuego and "Staten Landt" (Land of the States, today Isla de los Estados), named after the States General, the parliament of the United Provinces of the Netherlands. On this voyage they lost the Hoorn in a fire and, shortly afterwards (on January 31, 1616), rounded the "Cape of Hoorn" (today Cape Horn), named in memory of the lost ship.

They then continued north in search of provisions on the Juan Fernández Islands before crossing the Pacific. Captain Jan Schouten died shortly afterward of scurvy. Following a route similar to Quirós's, they discovered several islands north of the Tuamotu Archipelago and north of Tonga until reaching the Hoorn Islands, named after Schouten's hometown and the headquarters of the company sponsoring the voyage.

Upon reaching Batavia (on October 16, 1616), they were arrested for violating the VOC's monopoly, as it was not believed they had found a new route. Their remaining ship was confiscated, and they were sent back to the Netherlands. Le Maire died on the return voyage. Schouten arrived in the Netherlands on July 1, 1617.

The account of the voyage, attributed to Schouten, was published immediately and was a great success, going through multiple editions. Five years later, Le Maire's account, based on the recovered diary of the East India Company, was published. However, the voyage did not achieve its financial objectives and was not continued.
