= Águila Islet =

Islet in Magellanes Region, Chile

Native name: Islote Águila
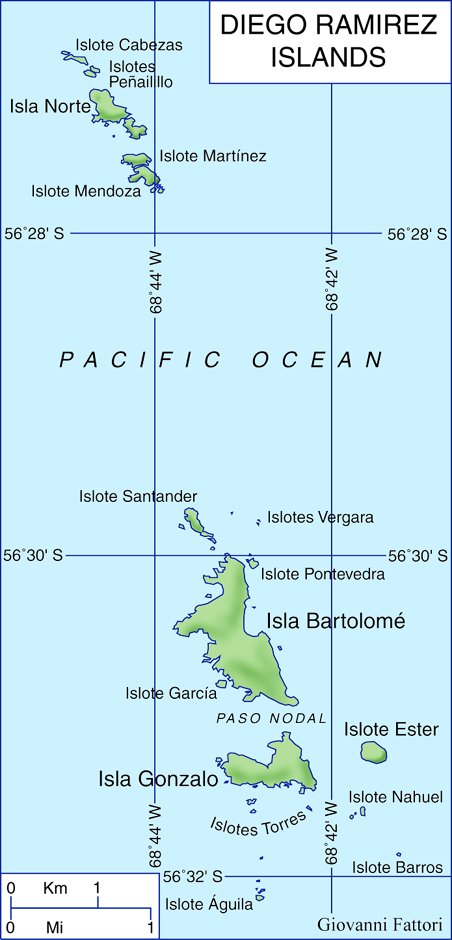
- Águila Islet on Diego Ramírez Islands (last on the bottom)

- Location within Magallanes and Chilean Antarctica Region

Geography
- Coordinates: 56°32′15″S 68°43′10″W
- Archipelago: Diego Ramírez Islands
- Adjacent to: Pacific Ocean

Administration
- Chile
- Region: Magallanes
- Province: Antartica Chilena
- Commune: Cabo de Hornos

Additional information
- NGA UFI=not listed

Águila Islet (Spanish: Islote Águila, "Eagle Islet") is the southernmost point of the Americas. It is part of the larger southern group of the Diego Ramírez Islands, 107 km (66 mi) southwest of Cape Horn in the Drake Passage.

The distance to the closest Antarctic lands (Greenwich Island, South Shetland Islands) is about 800 km (497 mi) and to the mainland (Antarctic Peninsula) is about 950 km (590 mi).

== See also ==
- Extreme points of the Antarctic
- List of Antarctic and sub-Antarctic islands
- List of extreme points of Chile
