= Le Maire Strait =

South American sea passage

Coordinates: 54°50′S 64°55′W

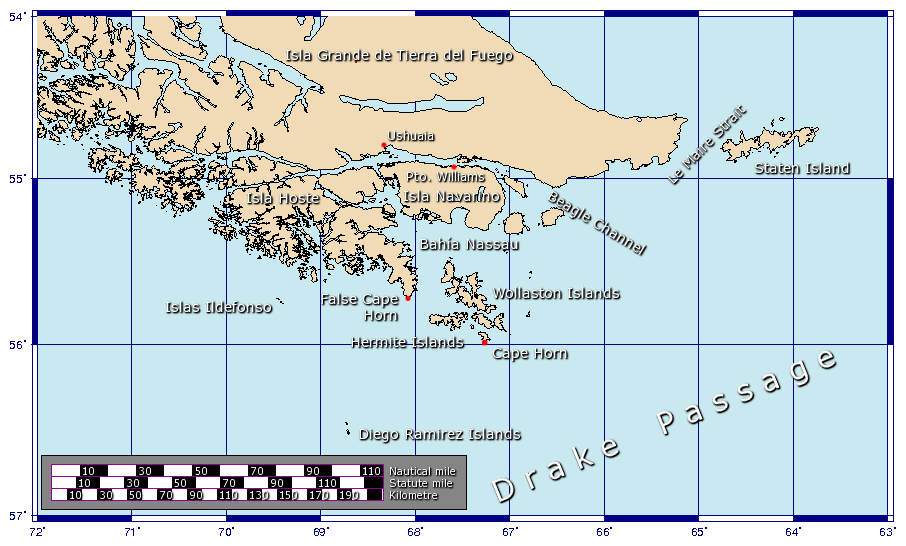
The area around Cape Horn, including the Le Maire Strait

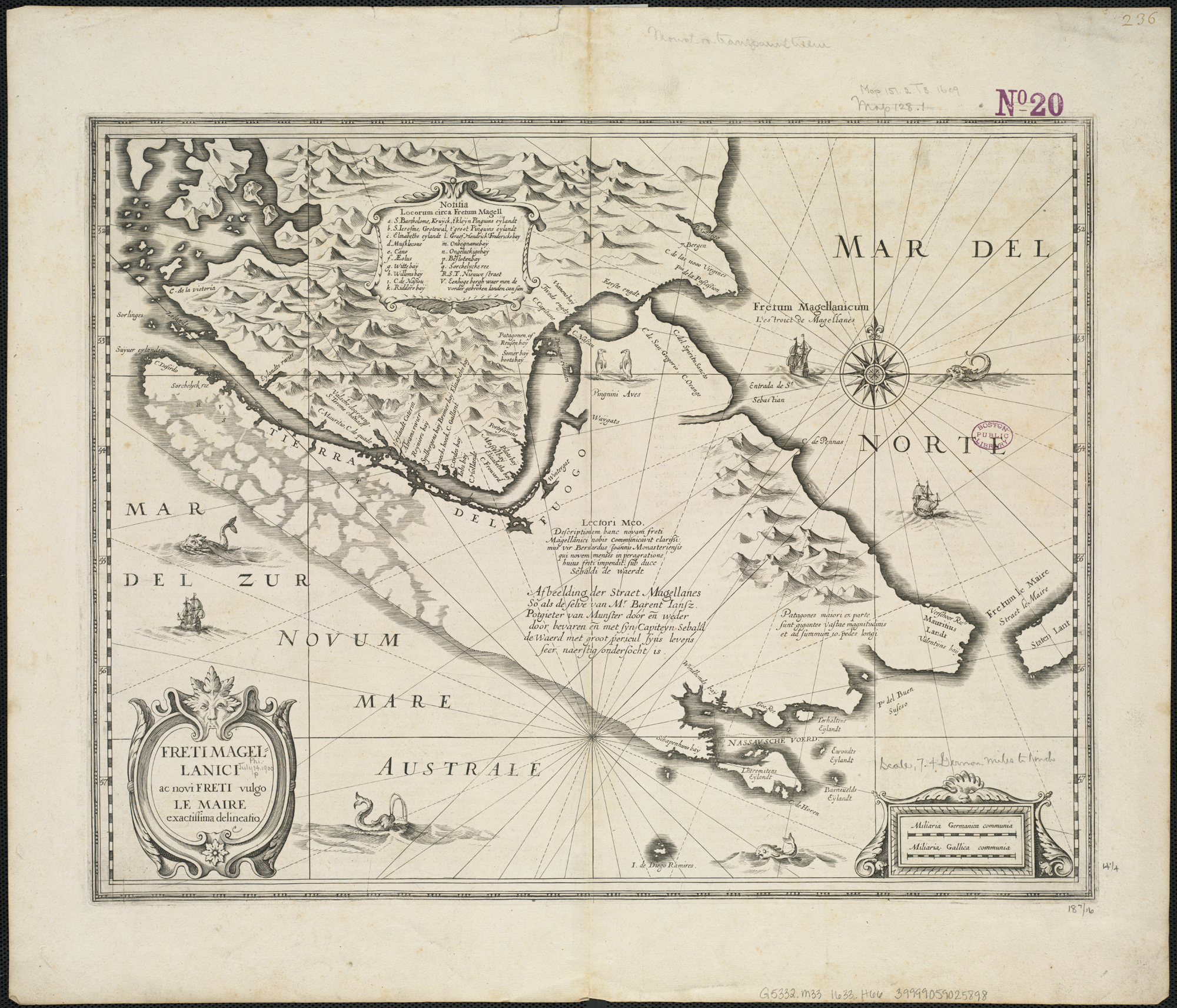
1633 map of Strait of Magellan, showing Strait Le Maire at the right, marked Fretum le Maire (Latin) and Straet Le Maire (Dutch)

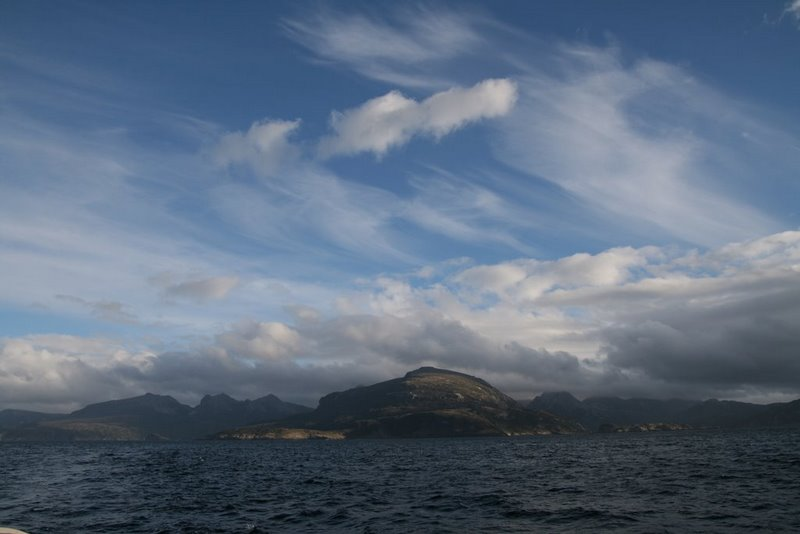
Isla de los Estados as seen from Le Maire Strait

The Le Maire Strait (French: Détroit de le Maire; Spanish: Estrecho de Le Maire), also known as the Straits Lemaire, is a strait between Isla de los Estados ("Staten Island") and the eastern extremity of the Argentine portion of Tierra del Fuego.

== History ==
Jacob Le Maire and Willem Schouten discovered the strait in 1616, while attempting to find a navigation link between the Atlantic and Pacific Oceans, shortly before their discovery of Cape Horn. The strait was named in honor of Le Maire. The Le Maire Strait has been Argentine controlled, but has been a historical access route for Chilean vessels, under international maritime law. The stormy weather and strong currents that the waters around Cape Horn are so famous for also affect the strait. To avoid the risk of being blown against the shore of Tierra del Fuego, sailing ships often instead favour going around to the east of Isla de los Estados.

The Magellanic penguin is found in the Le Maire Strait; this penguin has a breeding colony on Isla de los Estados, the location of one of the more southerly Atlantic breeding colonies of the Magellanic penguin.

== See also ==
- Garcia de Nodal expedition
