= Isla Bartolomé =

Uninhabited subantarctic island

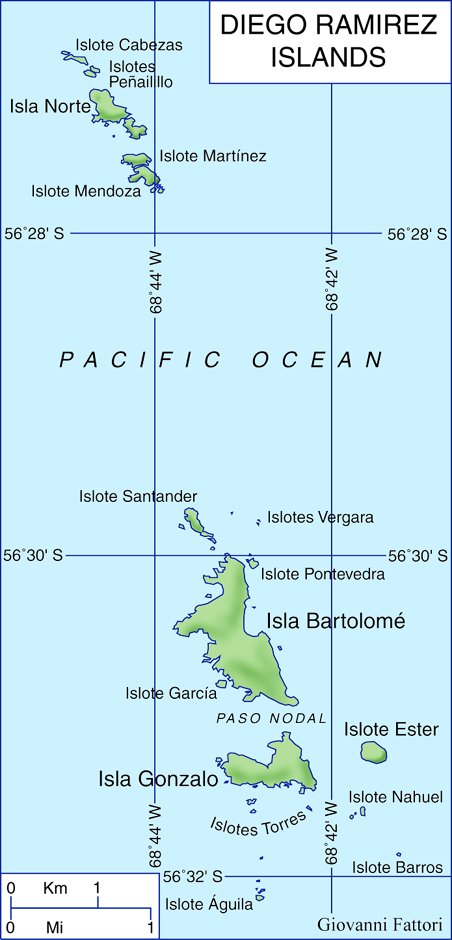
- Isla Bartolomé is the largest of the Diego Ramírez Islands

- Location within Southern Patagonia

Geography
- Coordinates: 56°32′S 68°43′W
- Archipelago: Diego Ramírez Islands
- Area: 0.93 km^{2} (0.36 sq mi)
- Highest elevation: 190 m (620 ft)

Administration
- Chile

Isla Bartolomé is an uninhabited subantarctic island. Administratively it belongs to Chile.

== Geography and ecology ==
With an area of 93 ha and a maximum height of 190 m (623 ft) it is the largest of the Diego Ramírez Archipelago, being more than twice the size of the second largest - Isla Gonzalo, lying in the Drake Passage between the continents of South America and Antarctica. It is an important breeding site for black-browed (over 35,000 pairs) and grey-headed (over 9000 pairs) albatrosses, as well as for southern giant petrels.

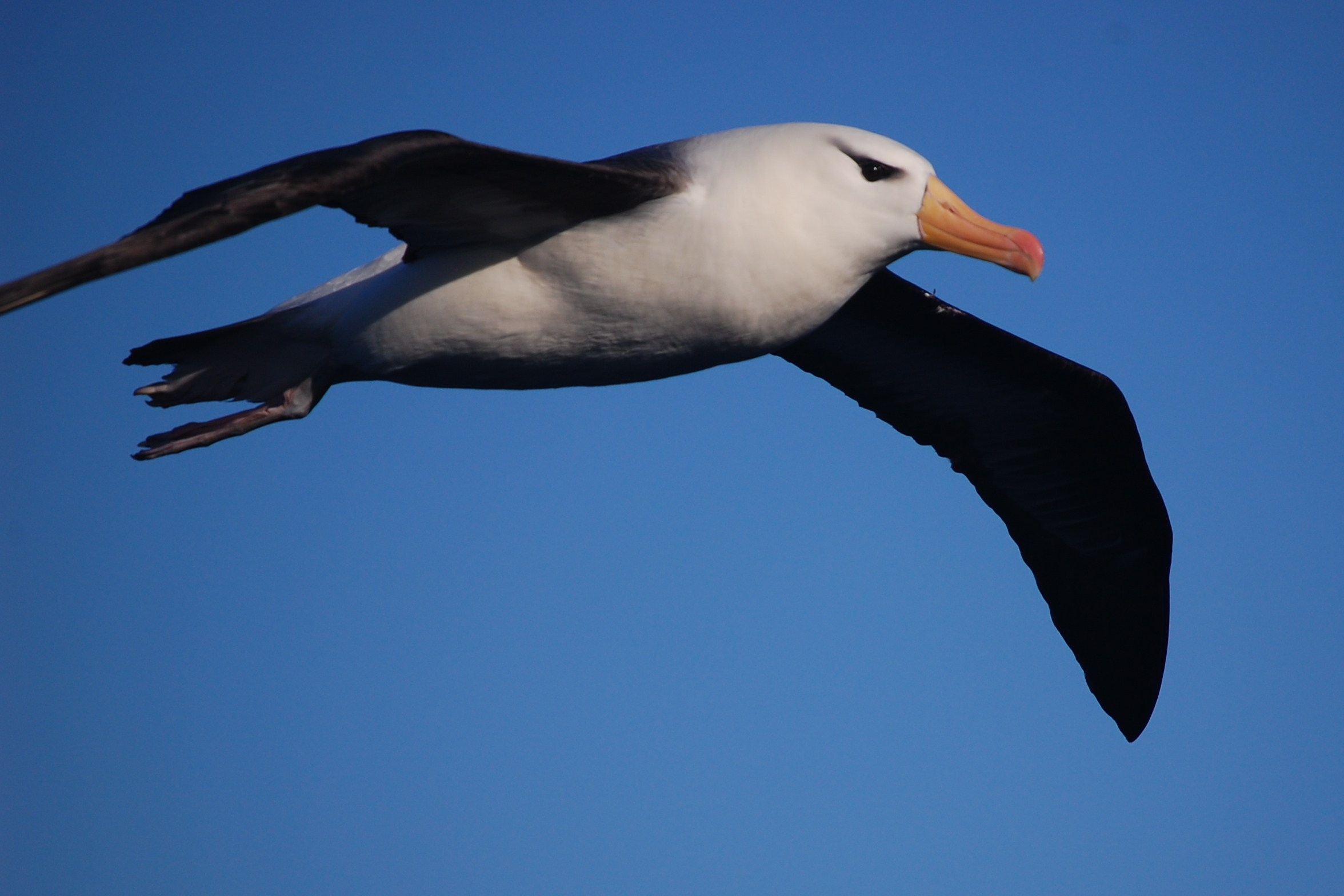
The island is an important breeding site for black-browed albatrosses

== See also ==
- List of Antarctic and sub-Antarctic islands
