= Cape Horn =

Headland of the Tierra del Fuego archipelago in Chile

Cape Horn Cabo de Hornos (Spanish)
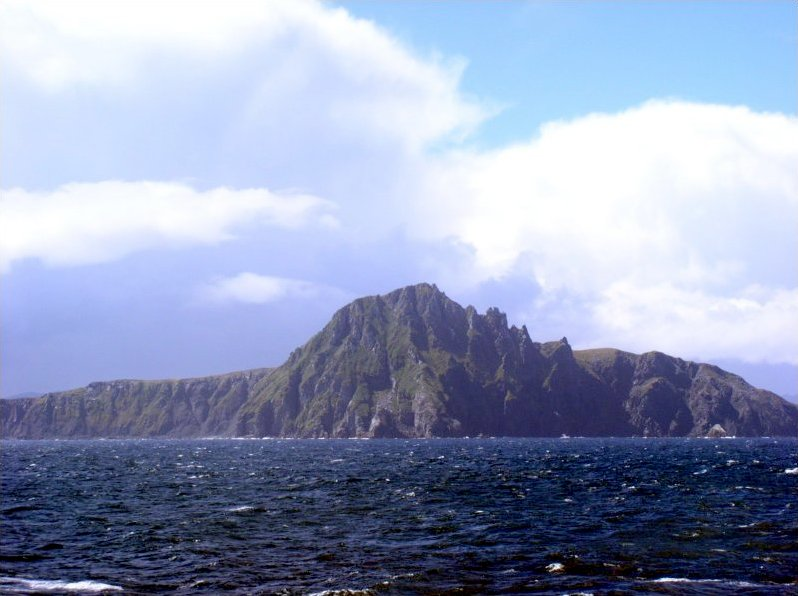
- Cape Horn is the southernmost headland of the Tierra del Fuego archipelago of southern Chile, and is located on the small Hornos Island. It marks both the northern boundary of the Drake Passage and where the Atlantic and Pacific Oceans meet.
- Coordinates: 55.9809215°S 67.292629°W
- Location: Chile, Magallanes y la Antártica Chilena Region, Antártica Chilena Province

Cape Horn (Spanish: Cabo de Hornos, pronounced [ˈkaβo ðe ˈoɾnos]) is the southernmost headland of the Tierra del Fuego archipelago of southern Chile, and is located on the small Hornos Island. Although not the most southerly point of South America (which is Águila Islet), Cape Horn marks both the northern boundary of the Drake Passage and where the Atlantic and Pacific Oceans meet.

Cape Horn was identified by mariners and first rounded in 1616 by the Dutchmen Willem Schouten and Jacob Le Maire, who named it Kaap Hoorn after the city of Hoorn in the Netherlands. For decades, Cape Horn was a major milestone on the clipper route, by which sailing ships carried trade around the world. The waters around Cape Horn are particularly hazardous, owing to strong winds, large waves, strong currents and icebergs.

The need for boats and ships to round Cape Horn was greatly reduced by the opening of the Panama Canal in August 1914. Sailing around Cape Horn is still widely regarded as one of the major challenges in yachting. Thus, a few recreational sailors continue to sail this route, sometimes as part of a circumnavigation of the globe. Almost all of these choose routes through the channels to the north of the Cape (many take a detour through the islands and anchor to wait for fair weather to visit Horn Island, or sail around it to replicate a rounding of this historic point). Several prominent ocean yacht races, notably the Volvo Ocean Race, Velux 5 Oceans Race, the solo Vendée Globe and Golden Globe Race as well as the Ocean Globe Race sail around the world via the Horn. Speed records for round-the-world sailing are recognized for following this route.

The islands around Cape Horn between South America and Antarctica

== Geography and ecology ==
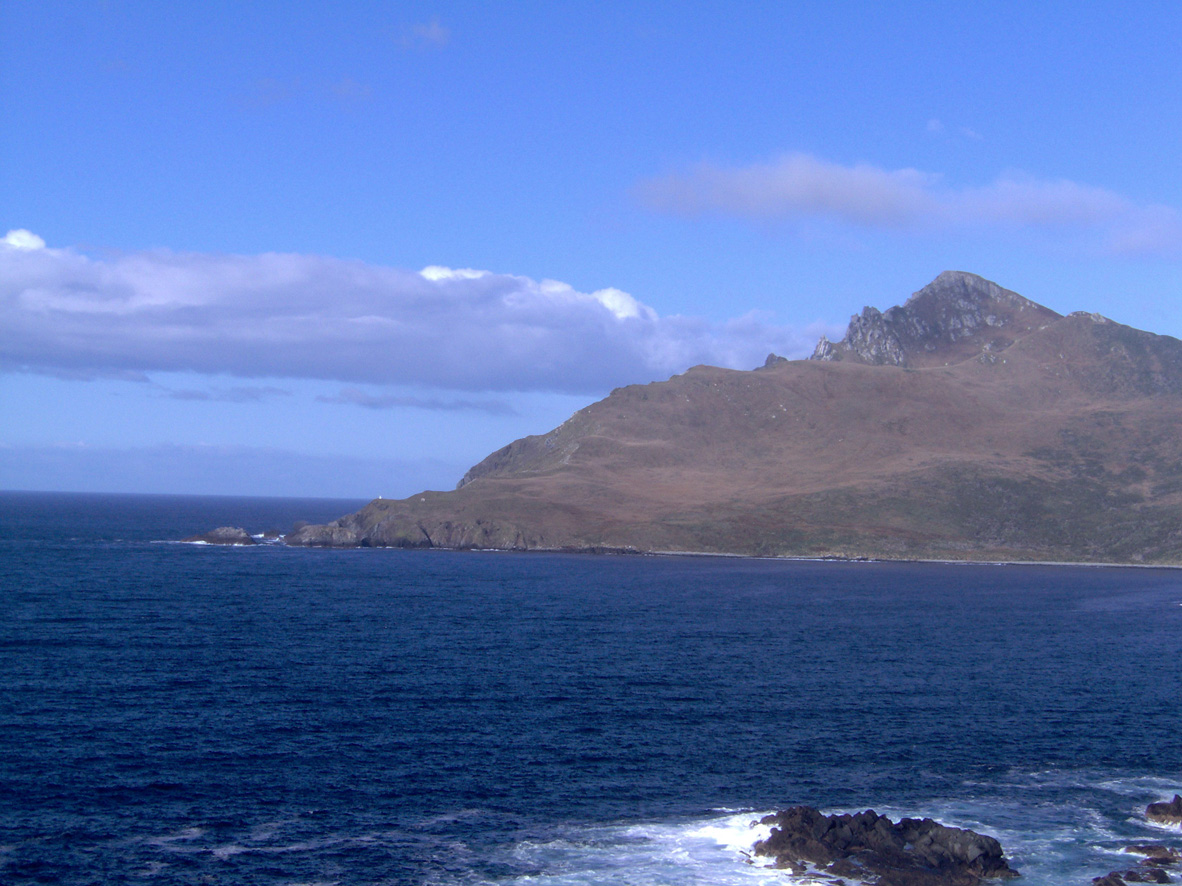
Cape Horn, seen from the Chilean Navy station location. The small lighthouse can be seen as a white spot close to the horizon.

Cape Horn is located on Hornos Island in the Hermite Islands group, at the southern end of the Tierra del Fuego archipelago. It marks the northern edge of the Drake Passage, the strait between South America and Antarctica. It is located in Cabo de Hornos National Park, Core of the Cape Horn Biosphere Reserve.

The cape lies within Chilean territorial waters, and the Chilean Navy maintains a station on Horn Island, consisting of a residence, utility building, chapel, and lighthouse, as well as the southern neighborhood of the Diego Ramírez Islands and the waters of the Diego Ramirez Islands & Drake Passage National Park . A short distance from the main station is a memorial, including a large sculpture made by Chilean sculptor José Balcells featuring the silhouette of an albatross, in remembrance of the sailors who died while attempting to "round the Horn". It was erected in 1992 through the initiative of the Chilean Section of the Cape Horn Captains Brotherhood. Due to severe winds characteristic of the region, the sculpture was blown over in 2014. A 2019 research expedition found the world's southernmost tree growing, a Magellan's beech mostly bent to the ground, on a northeast-facing slope at the island's southeast corner. Cape Horn is the southern limit of the range of the Magellanic penguin.

=== Climate ===
The climate in the region is generally cool, owing to the southern latitude. There are no weather stations in the group of islands including Cape Horn, but a study in 1882–1883 found an annual rainfall of 1,357 millimetres (53.4 inches), with an average annual temperature of 5.2 °C (41.4 °F). Winds were reported to average 30 kilometres per hour (8.3 m/s; 18.6 mph), (5 Bf), with squalls of over 100 kilometres per hour (27.8 m/s; 62.1 mph), (10 Bf) occurring in all seasons. There are 278 days of rainfall, (70 days snow) and 2,000 millimetres (79 inches) of annual rainfall. Cloud coverage is generally extensive, with averages from 5.2 eighths in May and July to 6.4 eighths in December and January. Precipitation is high throughout the year: the weather station on the nearby Diego Ramírez Islands, 109 kilometres (68 miles) south-west in the Drake Passage, shows the greatest rainfall in March, averaging 137.4 millimetres (5.4 in); while October, which has the least rainfall, still averages 93.7 millimetres (3.7 in). Wind conditions are generally severe, particularly in winter. In summer, the wind at Cape Horn is gale force up to 5 percent of the time, with generally good visibility; however, in winter, gale-force winds occur up to 30 percent of the time, often with poor visibility.

Many stories are told of hazardous journeys "around the Horn", most describing fierce storms. Charles Darwin wrote: "One sight of such a coast is enough to make a landsman dream for a week about shipwrecks, peril and death."

The region experiences barely 7 hours of daylight during the June solstice, with Cape Horn itself having 6 hours and 57 minutes. The region experiences around 17 1/2 hours of daylight during the December solstice, and experiences only nautical twilight from civil dusk to civil dawn. White nights occur during the week around the December solstice.

Cape Horn yields a polar climate (ET), with abundant precipitation—much of which falls as sleet and snow.

Climate data for Diego Ramírez Islands (Isla Gonzalo)
Month	Jan	Feb	Mar	Apr	May	Jun	Jul	Aug	Sep	Oct	Nov	Dec	Year
Mean daily maximum °C (°F)	14.7 (58.5)	14.4 (57.9)	12.8 (55.0)	9.8 (49.6)	6.4 (43.5)	4.2 (39.6)	3.7 (38.7)	5.3 (41.5)	7.9 (46.2)	10.6 (51.1)	12.5 (54.5)	14.1 (57.4)	9.7 (49.5)
Daily mean °C (°F)	7.2 (45.0)	7.5 (45.5)	6.6 (43.9)	5.6 (42.1)	4.5 (40.1)	3.7 (38.7)	3.2 (37.8)	3.2 (37.8)	3.6 (38.5)	4.7 (40.5)	5.5 (41.9)	6.5 (43.7)	5.2 (41.4)
Mean daily minimum °C (°F)	6.5 (43.7)	6.2 (43.2)	5.0 (41.0)	3.2 (37.8)	1.0 (33.8)	−0.7 (30.7)	−1.1 (30.0)	−1.0 (30.2)	1.0 (33.8)	2.6 (36.7)	4.4 (39.9)	5.7 (42.3)	2.7 (36.9)
Average precipitation mm (inches)	126.0 (4.96)	135.3 (5.33)	137.4 (5.41)	134.4 (5.29)	107.4 (4.23)	109.4 (4.31)	107.6 (4.24)	97.7 (3.85)	100.0 (3.94)	93.7 (3.69)	99.3 (3.91)	119.3 (4.70)	1,367.5 (53.84)
Source: Meteorología Interactiva

=== Political ===
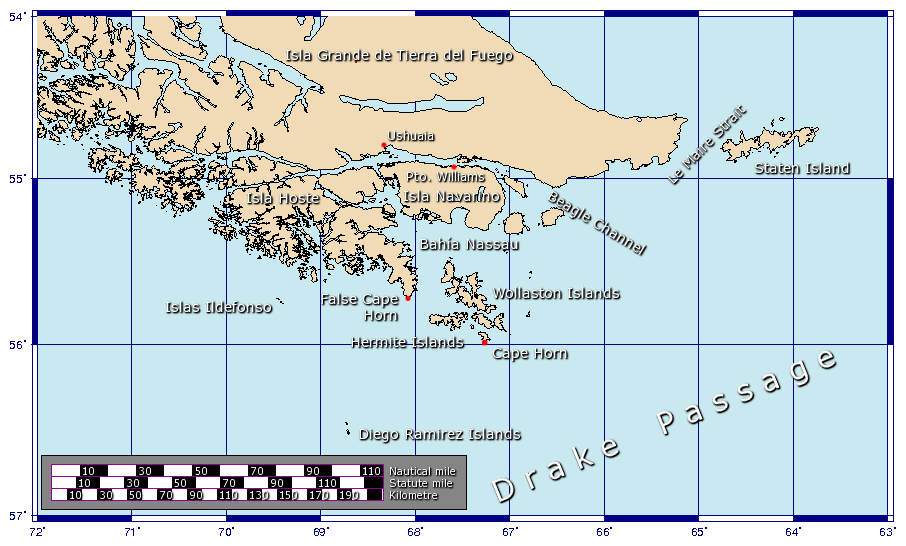
Southern tip of South America, showing Cape Horn

Cape Horn is part of the Commune of Cabo de Hornos, whose capital is Puerto Williams; this in turn is part of Antártica Chilena Province, whose capital is also Puerto Williams. The area is part of the Magallanes y la Antártica Chilena Region of Chile. Puerto Toro, a few miles south of Puerto Williams, is the closest town to the cape.

== Modern navigation ==
There are no regular commercial routes around the Horn, and modern ships carrying cargo are rarely seen. However, a number of cruise ships routinely round the Horn when traveling from one ocean to the other. These often stop in Ushuaia or Punta Arenas as well as Port Stanley. Some of the small passenger vessels shuttling between Ushuaia and the Antarctic Peninsula will pass the Horn too, time and weather permitting.

=== Sailing routes ===
A number of potential sailing routes may be followed around the tip of South America. The Strait of Magellan, between the mainland and Tierra del Fuego, is a major—although narrow—passage, which was in use for trade well before the Horn was discovered. The Beagle Channel (named for the ship of Charles Darwin's expedition), between Tierra del Fuego and Isla Navarino, offers a potential, though difficult route. Other passages may be taken around the Wollaston and Hermite Islands to the north of Cape Horn.

All of these, however, are notorious for treacherous williwaw winds, which can strike a vessel with little or no warning; given the narrowness of these routes, vessels have a significant risk of being driven onto the rocks. The open waters of the Drake Passage, south of Cape Horn, provide by far the widest route, at about 800 kilometres (500 miles) wide; this passage offers ample sea room for maneuvering as winds change, and is the route used by most ships and sailboats, despite the possibility of extreme wave conditions.

=== "Rounding" vs "Doubling" the Horn ===
Rounding Cape Horn can be done on a day trip by helicopter or more arduously by charter power boat or sailboat, or by cruise ship. "Doubling the Horn" is traditionally understood to involve sailing from a point above 50 degrees South in the Pacific around the Horn to a point above 50 degrees South in the Atlantic, and then sailing back against the prevailing westerly winds to a point above the 50th parallel south again back in the Pacific—a considerably more difficult and time-consuming endeavor having a minimum length of 930 miles (1,500 km) for each leg . The 50th parallel south on both coasts of South America represent a set of benchmark latitudes of a Horn run, and is a region of the ocean that according to Herman Melville, "takes the conceit out of fresh-water sailors, and steeps in a still saltier brine the saltiest".

=== Shipping hazards ===
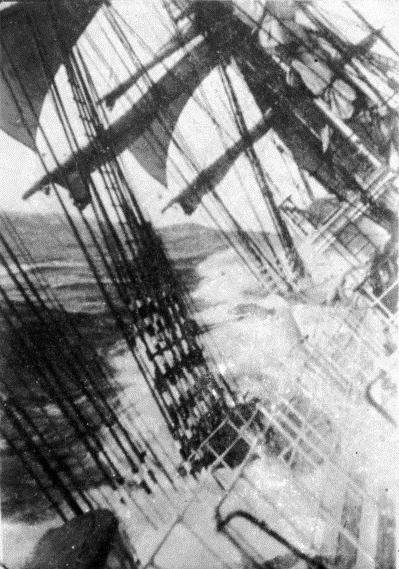
View from an unidentified sailing ship during a storm at Cape Horn, between 1885 and 1954

Several factors combine to make the passage around Cape Horn one of the most hazardous shipping routes in the world: the fierce sailing conditions prevalent in the Southern Ocean generally; the geography of the passage south of the Horn; and the extreme southern latitude of the Horn, at 56° south (for comparison, Cape Agulhas at the southern tip of Africa is at 35° south; Stewart Island / Rakiura at the south end of New Zealand is 47° south; Edinburgh 56° north).

The prevailing winds in latitudes below 40° south can blow from west to east around the world almost uninterrupted by land, giving rise to the "roaring forties" and the even more wild "furious fifties" and "screaming sixties". These winds are hazardous enough that ships traveling east would tend to stay in the northern part of the forties (i.e. not far below 40° south latitude); however, rounding Cape Horn requires ships to press south to 56° south latitude, well into the zone of fiercest winds. These winds are exacerbated at the Horn by the funneling effect of the Andes and the Antarctic Peninsula, which channel the winds into the relatively narrow Drake Passage.

The strong winds of the Southern Ocean give rise to correspondingly large waves; these waves can attain great height as they roll around the Southern Ocean, free of any interruption from land. South of the Horn, however, these waves encounter an area of shallow water, which has the effect of making the waves shorter and steeper, greatly increasing the hazard to ships. If the strong eastward current through the Drake Passage encounters an opposing westerly wind, this can have the effect of further building up the waves. In addition to these "normal" waves, the area west of the Horn is particularly notorious for rogue waves, which can attain heights of up to 30 metres (98 feet).

The prevailing winds and currents create particular problems for vessels trying to round the Horn against them, i.e. from east to west. This was a particularly serious problem for traditional sailing ships, which could make very little headway against the wind at the best of times; modern sailing boats are significantly more efficient to windward and can more reliably make a westward passage of the Horn, as they do in the Global Challenge race.

Ice is a hazard to sailors venturing far below 40° south. Although the ice limit dips south around the horn, icebergs are a significant hazard for vessels in the area. In the South Pacific in February (summer in Southern Hemisphere), icebergs are generally confined to below 50° south; but in August the iceberg hazard can extend north of 40° south. Even in February, the Horn is well below the latitude of the iceberg limit. These hazards have made the Horn notorious as perhaps the most dangerous ship passage in the world; many ships have been wrecked, and many sailors have died attempting to round the Cape.

=== Lighthouses ===
Two lighthouses are located near or in Cape Horn. The one located in the Chilean Navy Station is the more accessible and visited, and is commonly referred to as the Cape Horn lighthouse . However, the Chilean Navy station, including the lighthouse (ARLS CHI-030, 55°57′49″S 67°13′14″W) and the memorial, are not located on Cape Horn (which is difficult to access either by land or sea), but on another land point about one mile east-northeast.

On Cape Horn proper is a smaller 4-metre (13-foot) fiberglass light tower, with a focal plane of 40 metres (130 feet) and a range of about 21 kilometres (13 miles). This is the authentic Cape Horn lighthouse (ARLS CHI-006, 55°58′38″S 67°15′46″W), and as such the world's southernmost traditional lighthouse. A few minor aids to navigation are located farther south, including one in the Diego Ramírez Islands and several in Antarctica.

=== Recreational and sport sailing ===
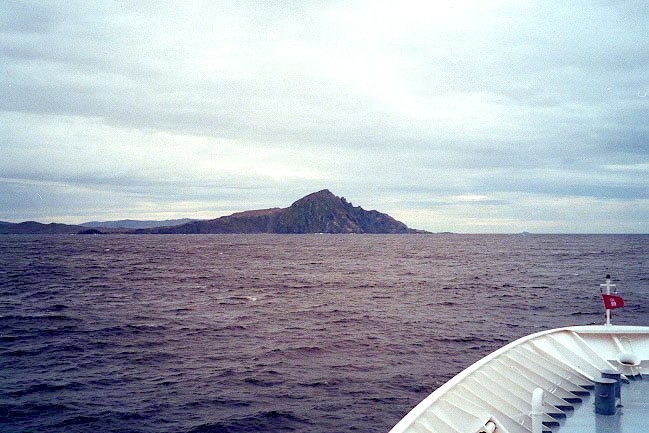
Approaching Cape Horn from the south-west.

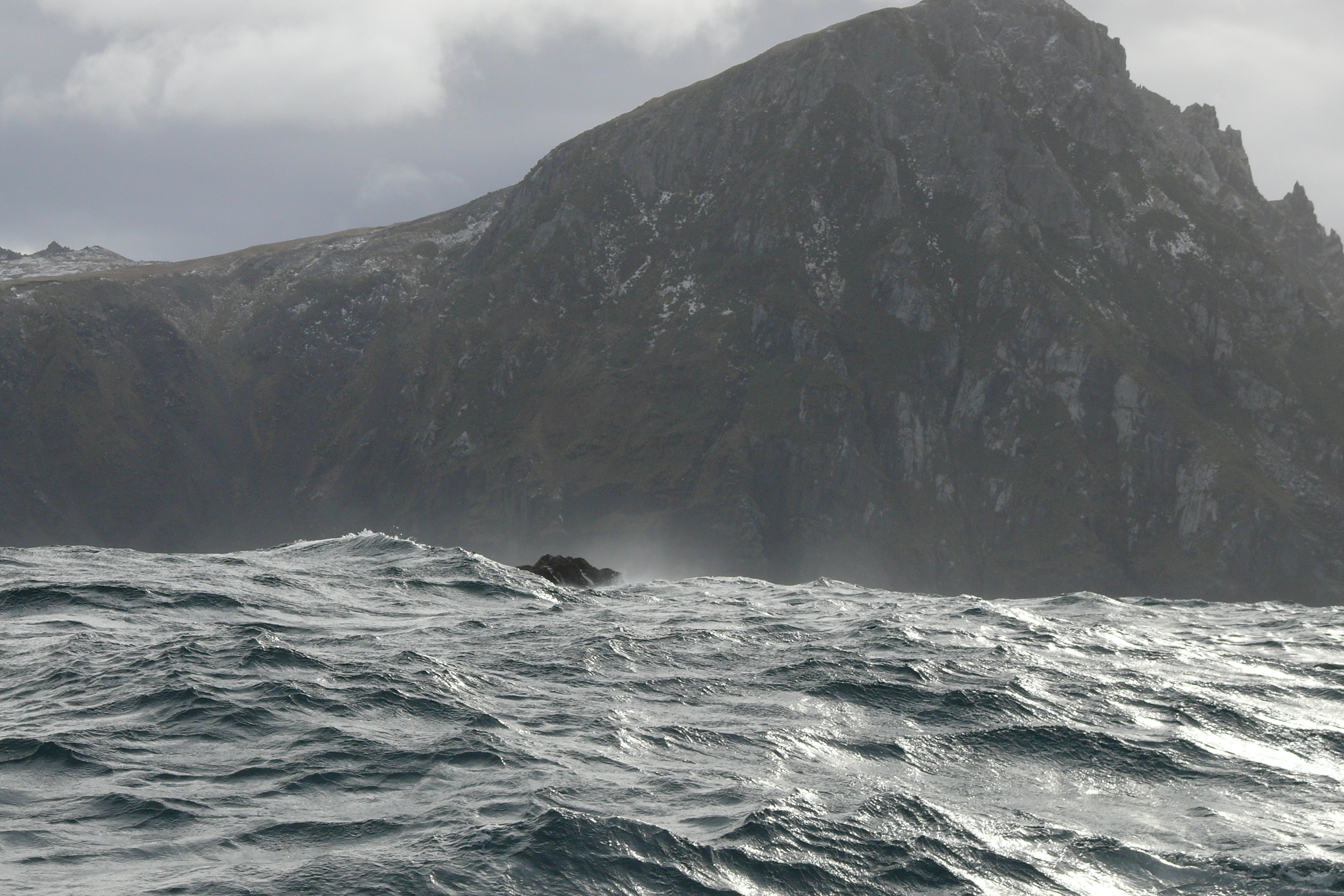
Cape Horn from aboard the sailboat "Tari II", photographed by Ingo Kühl, october 25, 2009

Despite the opening of the Suez and Panama Canals, the Horn remains part of the fastest sailing route around the world, and so the growth in recreational long-distance sailing has brought about a revival of sailing via the Horn. Owing to the remoteness of the location and the hazards there, a rounding of Cape Horn is widely considered to be the yachting equivalent of climbing Mount Everest, and so many sailors seek it for its own sake.

Joshua Slocum was the first single-handed yachtsman to successfully pass this way (in 1895) although in the end, extreme weather forced him to use some of the inshore routes between the channels and islands and it is believed he did not actually pass outside the Horn proper. If one had to go by strict definitions, the first small boat to sail around outside Cape Horn was the Irish 42-foot (13-metre) yacht Saoirse, sailed by Conor O'Brien with three friends, who rounded it during a circumnavigation of the world between 1923 and 1925. In 1934, the Norwegian Al Hansen was the first to round Cape Horn single-handed from east to west—the "wrong way"—in his boat Mary Jane, but was subsequently wrecked on the coast of Chile. The first person to successfully circumnavigate the world single-handed via Cape Horn was Argentinian Vito Dumas, who made the voyage in 1942 in his 33-foot (10-metre) ketch Lehg II; a number of other sailors have since followed him, including Webb Chiles aboard "EGREGIOUS" who in December 1975 rounded Cape Horn single-handed. On March 31, 2010, 16-year-old Abby Sunderland became the youngest person to single-handedly sail around Cape Horn in her attempt to circumnavigate the globe. In 1987 The British Cape Horn Expedition, headed by Nigel H. Seymour, rounded Cape Horn in the world's first ever 'sailing kayaks', called 'Kaymaran'; two seagoing kayaks which could link together with two sails mountable in any of the four sailing positions between the two kayaks.

Today, there are several major yacht races held regularly along the old clipper route via Cape Horn. The first of these was the Sunday Times Golden Globe Race, which was a single-handed race; this inspired the present-day Around Alone race, which circumnavigates with stops, and the Vendée Globe, which is non-stop. Both of these are single-handed races, and are held every four years. The Volvo Ocean Race is a crewed race with stops which sails the clipper route every four years. Its origins lie in the Whitbread Round the World Race first competed in 1973–74. The Jules Verne Trophy is a prize for the fastest circumnavigation of the world by any type of yacht, with no restrictions on the size of the crew (no assistance, non-stop). Finally, the Global Challenge race goes around the world the "wrong way", from east to west, which involves rounding Cape Horn against the prevailing winds and currents.

The Horn remains a major hazard for recreational sailors, however. A classic case is that of Miles and Beryl Smeeton, who attempted to round the Horn in their yacht Tzu Hang. Hit by a rogue wave when approaching the Horn, the boat pitchpoled (i.e. somersaulted end-over-end). They survived, and were able to make repairs in Talcahuano, Chile, and later attempted the passage again, only to be rolled over and dismasted for a second time by another rogue wave, which again they miraculously survived.

== History ==
=== Discovery by Europeans ===
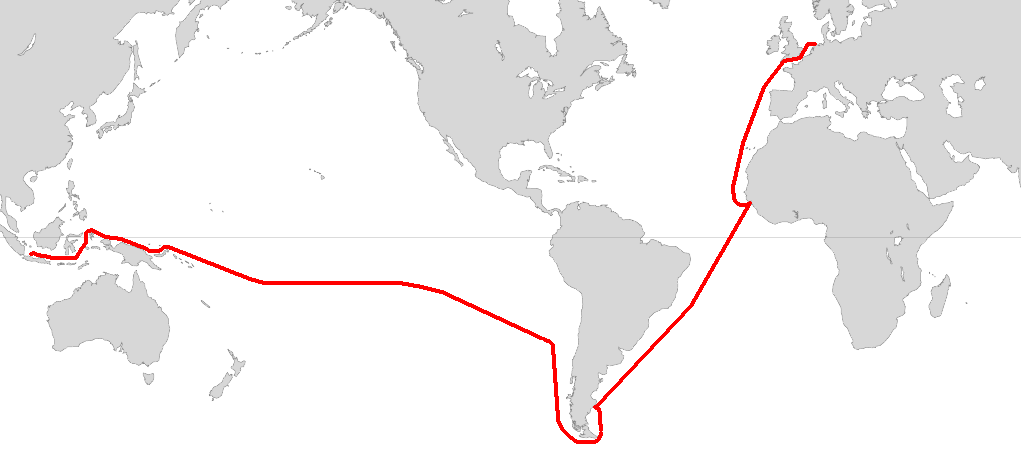
Voyage of Willem Schouten and Jacob le Maire in 1615/16

In September 1578, Sir Francis Drake, in the course of his circumnavigation of the world, passed through the Strait of Magellan into the Pacific Ocean. Before he could continue his voyage north his ships encountered a storm, and were blown well to the south of Tierra del Fuego. The expanse of open water they encountered led Drake to guess that far from being another continent, as previously believed, Tierra del Fuego was an island with open sea to its south. This discovery went unused for some time, as ships continued to use the known passage through the Strait of Magellan.

By the early 17th century the Dutch East India Company was given a monopoly on all Dutch trade via the Straits of Magellan and the Cape of Good Hope, the only known sea routes at the time to the Far East. To search for an alternate route and one to the unknown Terra Australis, Isaac Le Maire, a wealthy Amsterdam merchant and Willem Schouten, a ship's master of Hoorn, contributed in equal shares to the enterprise, with additional financial support from merchants of Hoorn. Jacob Le Maire, Isaac's son, went on the journey as "chiefe Marchant and principall factor", in charge of trading aspects of the endeavour. The two ships that departed Holland at the beginning of June 1615 were the Eendracht of 360 tons with Schouten and Le Maire aboard, and the Hoorn of 110 tons, of which Schouten's brother Johan was master. It was Eendracht then, with the crew of the recently wrecked Hoorn aboard, that passed through the Le Maire Strait and Schouten and Le Maire made their great discovery:

In the evening 25 January 1616 the winde was South West, and that night wee went South with great waves or billowes out of the southwest, and very blew water, whereby wee judged, and held for certaine that ... it was the great South Sea, whereat we were exceeding glad to thinke that wee had discovered a way, which until that time, was unknowne to men, as afterward wee found it to be true. ... on 29 January 1616 we saw land againe lying north west and north northwest from us, which was the land that lay South from the straights of Magelan which reacheth Southward, all high hillie lande covered over with snow, ending with a sharpe point which wee called Cape Horne [Kaap Hoorn] ...

At the time it was discovered, the Horn was believed to be the southernmost point of Tierra del Fuego; the unpredictable violence of weather and sea conditions in the Drake Passage made exploration difficult, and it was only in 1624 that the Horn was discovered to be an island. It is a telling testament to the difficulty of conditions there that Antarctica, only 650 kilometres (400 miles) away across the Drake Passage, was discovered only as recently as 1820, despite the passage having been used as a major shipping route for 200 years.

=== Historic trade route ===
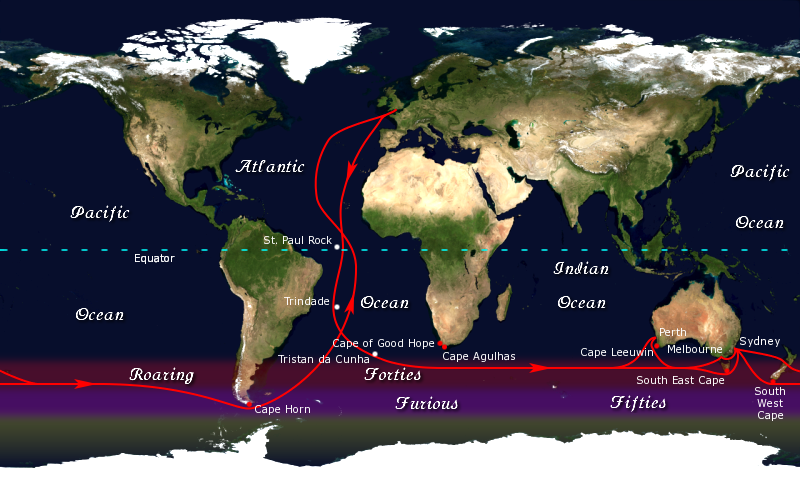
The clipper route followed by ships sailing between the United Kingdom and Australia/ New Zealand passed around Cape Horn

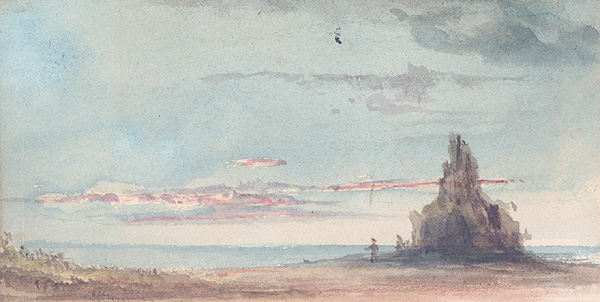
Cape Horn as seen during the United States Exploring Expedition, depicted in watercolor by Alfred Thomas Agate

From the 18th to the early 20th centuries, Cape Horn was a part of the clipper routes which carried much of the world's trade. Sailing ships sailed round the Horn carrying wool, grain, and gold from Australia back to Europe; these included the windjammers in the heyday of the Great Grain Race of the 1930s. Much trade was carried around the Horn between Europe and the Far East; and trade and passenger ships travelled between the coasts of the United States via the Horn. The Horn exacted a heavy toll from shipping, however, owing to the extremely hazardous combination of conditions there.

The only facilities in the vicinity able to service or supply a ship, or provide medical care, were in the Falkland Islands. The businesses there were so notorious for price-gouging that damaged ships were sometimes abandoned at Port Stanley.

While most companies switched to steamers and later used the Panama Canal, German steel-hulled sailing ships like the Flying P-Liners were designed since the 1890s to withstand the weather conditions around the Horn, as they specialized in the South American nitrate trade and later the Australian grain trade. None of them were lost travelling around the Horn, but some, like the mighty Preußen, were victims of collisions in the busy English Channel.

Traditionally, a sailor who had rounded the Horn was entitled to wear a gold loop earring—in the left ear, the one which had faced the Horn in a typical eastbound passage—and to dine with one foot on the table; a sailor who had also rounded the Cape of Good Hope could place both feet on the table.

One particular historic attempt to round the Horn, that of HMS Bounty in 1788, has been immortalized in history due to the subsequent mutiny. This abortive Horn voyage has been portrayed (with varying historical accuracy) in three major films about Captain William Bligh's mission to transport breadfruit plants from Tahiti to Jamaica. The Bounty made only 85 miles of headway in 31 days of east-to-west sailing, before giving up by reversing course and going around Africa. Although the 1984 movie portrayed another decision to go round the Horn as a precipitating factor in the mutiny (this time west-to-east after collecting the breadfruits in the South Pacific), in fact that was never contemplated out of concern for the effect of the low temperatures near the Horn on the plants.

The transcontinental railroads in North America, as well as the Panama Canal that opened in 1914 in Central America, led to a gradual decrease in use of the Horn for trade. As steamships replaced sailing ships, Flying P-Liner Pamir became the last commercial sailing ship to round Cape Horn laden with cargo, carrying grain from Port Victoria, Australia, to Falmouth, England, in 1949.

== Literature and culture ==
Cape Horn has been an icon of sailing culture for centuries; it has featured in sea shanties and in many books about sailing. One of the classic accounts of a working ship in the age of sail is Two Years Before the Mast, by Richard Henry Dana Jr., in which the author describes an arduous trip from Boston to California via Cape Horn:

Just before eight o'clock (then about sundown, in that latitude) the cry of "All hands ahoy!" was sounded down the fore scuttle and the after hatchway, and hurrying upon deck, we found a large black cloud rolling on toward us from the south-west, and blackening the whole heavens. "Here comes Cape Horn!" said the chief mate; and we had hardly time to haul down and clew up, before it was upon us. In a few moments, a heavier sea was raised than I had ever seen before, and as it was directly ahead, the little brig, which was no better than a bathing machine, plunged into it, and all the forward part of her was under water; the sea pouring in through the bow-ports and hawse-hole and over the knightheads, threatening to wash everything overboard. In the lee scuppers it was up to a man's waist. We sprang aloft and double reefed the topsails, and furled all the other sails, and made all snug. But this would not do; the brig was laboring and straining against the head sea, and the gale was growing worse and worse. At the same time sleet and hail were driving with all fury against us. We clewed down, and hauled out the reef-tackles again, and close-reefed the fore-topsail, and furled the main, and hove her to on the starboard tack. Here was an end to our fine prospects....

After nine more days of headwinds and unabated storms, Dana reported that his ship, the "Pilgrim" finally cleared the turbulent waters of Cape Horn and turned northwards.

Charles Darwin, in The Voyage of the Beagle, a journal of the five-year expedition upon which he based The Origin of Species, described his 1832 encounter with the Horn:

... we closed in with the Barnevelts, and running past Cape Deceit with its stony peaks, about three o'clock doubled the weather-beaten Cape Horn. The evening was calm and bright, and we enjoyed a fine view of the surrounding isles. Cape Horn, however, demanded his tribute, and before night sent us a gale of wind directly in our teeth. We stood out to sea, and on the second day again made the land, when we saw on our weather-bow this notorious promontory in its proper form—veiled in a mist, and its dim outline surrounded by a storm of wind and water. Great black clouds were rolling across the heavens, and squalls of rain, with hail, swept by us with such extreme violence, that the Captain determined to run into Wigwam Cove. This is a snug little harbour, not far from Cape Horn; and here, at Christmas-eve, we anchored in smooth water.

William Jones, writing of his experience in 1905 as a fifteen-year-old apprentice on one of the last commercial sailing ships, noted the contrast between his ship, which would take two months and the lives of three sailors to round the Horn, and birds adapted to the region:

An albatross appears out of the murk, to examine us in our plight. The gale is of hurricane force, but the bird sails serenely and unhurriedly through the air, within a few feet of the ship's rail, on the windward side. Then it turns into the eye of the wind, and disappears in the murk —westward —without any discernible effort in its aerial gliding, while we are still drifting to leeward, incapable of emulating its brilliant defiance of the gusts.

Alan Villiers, a modern-day expert in traditional sailing ships, wrote many books about traditional sailing, including By way of Cape Horn. More recent sailors have taken on the Horn singly, such as Vito Dumas, who wrote Alone Through The Roaring Forties based on his round-the-world voyage; or with small crews.

Bernard Moitessier made two significant voyages round the Horn; once with his wife Françoise, described in Cape Horn: The Logical Route, and once single-handed. His book The Long Way tells the story of this latter voyage, and of a peaceful night-time passage of the Horn: "The little cloud underneath the moon has moved to the right. I look... there it is, so close, less than 10 miles (16 km) away and right under the moon. And nothing remains but the sky and the moon playing with the Horn. I look. I can hardly believe it. So small and so huge. A hillock, pale and tender in the moonlight; a colossal rock, hard as diamond."

John Masefield wrote: "Cape Horn, that tramples beauty into wreck / And crumples steel and smites the strong man dumb."

A memorial presented in Robert FitzRoy's bicentenary (2005) commemorates his landing on Cape Horn on 19 April 1830.

Canadian singer-songwriter Gordon Lightfoot wrote a song entitled "Ghosts of Cape Horn".

In 1980 Keith F. Critchlow directed and produced the documentary film "Ghosts of Cape Horn", with the participation and archaeological consulting of famous underwater archaeologist Peter Throckmorton.

== See also ==
- Beagle conflict – Border dispute between Chile and Argentina affecting the nearby Picton, Lennox and Nueva islands
- Cape Horn Biosphere Reserve – Protected area in Chile
- Cape Horner – Sailors who have rounded Cape Horn aboard a sailing ship
- Cape Leeuwin – Most south-westerly mainland point of the Australian continent, the Australian landmark on the clipper route
- False Cape Horn – Headland in Chile
- Garcia de Nodal expedition – 1619 Spanish exploration, the second passing around Cape Horn
- Patagonian Expedition Race – Adventure racing
- Cape of Good Hope
- Great capes

== Sources ==
- The War with Cape Horn by Alan Villiers. Published by Charles Scribner's Sons, 1971. ISBN 9780684106243
