= Jacob Le Maire =

Dutch mariner and explorer (c.1585–1616)

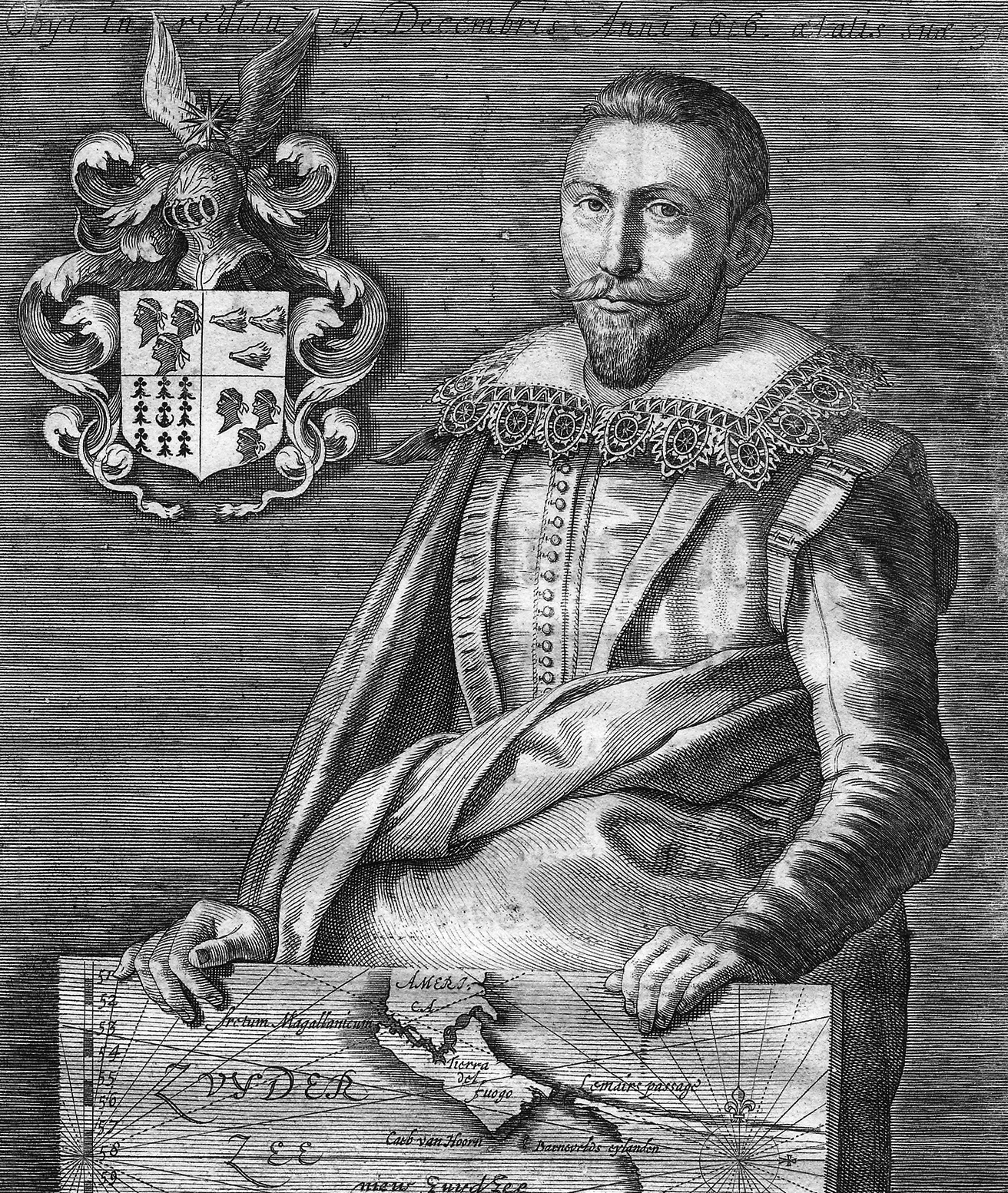
- Born: c. 1585; Antwerp or Amsterdam
- Died: 22 December 1616
- Occupation: mariner
- Known for: circumnavigation

Jacob Le Maire (c. 1585 – 22 December 1616) was a Dutch mariner who circumnavigated the Earth in 1615 and 1616. The strait between Tierra del Fuego and Isla de los Estados was named the Le Maire Strait in his honour, though not without controversy. It was Le Maire himself who proposed to the council aboard Eendracht that the new passage should be called by his name and the council unanimously agreed with Le Maire. The author or authors of The Relation took Eendracht captain Willem Schouten's side by proclaiming:

“ ... our men had each of them three cups of wine in signe of ioy for our good hap ... [and the naming of] the Straights of Le Maire, although by good right it should rather have been called Willem Schouten Straight, after our Masters Name, by whose wise conduction and skill in sayling, the same was found.”.

Eendracht then rounded Cape Horn, proving that Tierra del Fuego was not a continent.

== Biography ==
Jacob Le Maire was born in either Antwerp or Amsterdam, one of the 22 children of Maria Walraven of Antwerp and Isaac Le Maire (1558–1624) of Tournai, who was then already a prosperous merchant in Antwerp. Isaac and Maria married shortly before the Spanish siege of Antwerp in 1585 after which they fled to settle in Amsterdam. Jacob is thought to have been the oldest son, born perhaps the same year. Isaac was very successful in Amsterdam, and became one of the founders of the Dutch East India Company (VOC). However, in 1605 Isaac Le Maire was forced to leave the company after a dispute and for the next decade tried to break the company's monopoly on the trade to the East Indies.

By 1615 Isaac had established a new company (the Australian Company) with the goal to find a new route to the Pacific and the Spice Islands, thereby evading the restrictions of the VOC. He contributed to the outfitting of two ships, the Eendracht and Hoorn, and put his son Jacob in charge of trading during the expedition. The experienced ship master Willem Schouten was captain of the Eendracht and a participant of the enterprise in equal shares with Isaac Le Maire.

On 14 June 1615 Jacob le Maire and Willem Schouten sailed from Texel in the United Provinces. On 29 January 1616 they rounded Cape Horn, which they named for the Hoorn, which was lost in a fire. The Dutch city of Hoorn was also the birthplace of Schouten. After failing to moor at the Juan Fernández Islands in early March, the ships crossed the Pacific in a fairly straight line, visiting several of the Tuamotus. Between 21 and 24 April 1616 they were the first Westerners to visit the (Northern) Tonga islands: "Cocos Island" (Tafahi), "Traitors Island" (Niuatoputapu), and "Island of Good Hope" (Niuafo'ou). On 28 April they discovered the Hoorn Islands (Futuna and Alofi), where they were very well received and stayed until 12 May. They then followed the north coasts of New Ireland and New Guinea and visited adjacent islands, including, on 24 July, what became known as the Schouten Islands.

They reached the northern Moluccas in August and finally Ternate, the headquarters of the VOC, on 12 September 1616. Here they were enthusiastically welcomed by Governor-General Laurens Reael, admiral Steven Verhagen, and the governor of Ambon, Jasper Jansz.

The Eendracht sailed on to Java and reached Batavia on 28 October with a remarkable 84 of the original 87 crew members of both ships on board. Although they had opened an unknown route, Jan Pieterszoon Coen of the VOC claimed infringement of its monopoly of trade to the Spice Islands. Le Maire and Schouten were arrested and the Eendracht was confiscated. After being released, they returned from Batavia to Amsterdam in the company of Joris van Spilbergen, who was on a circumnavigation of the Earth himself, be it via the traditional Strait of Magellan.

Le Maire was aboard the ship Amsterdam on this journey home, but died en route. Van Spilbergen was at his deathbed and took Le Maire's report of his trip, which he included in his book Mirror of the East and West Indies. The rest of the crew arrived in the Netherlands on 1 July 1617, two years and 17 days after they departed. Jacob's father Isaac challenged the confiscation and the conclusion of the VOC, but it took him until 1622 until a court ruled in his favour. He was awarded 64,000 pounds and retrieved his son's diaries (which he then published as well), and his company was allowed trade via the newly discovered route. Unfortunately, by then, the Dutch West India Company had claimed the same waters.
