= Diego Ramírez Islands =

Subantarctic islands of Chile

Diego Ramírez Islands Islas Diego Ramírez
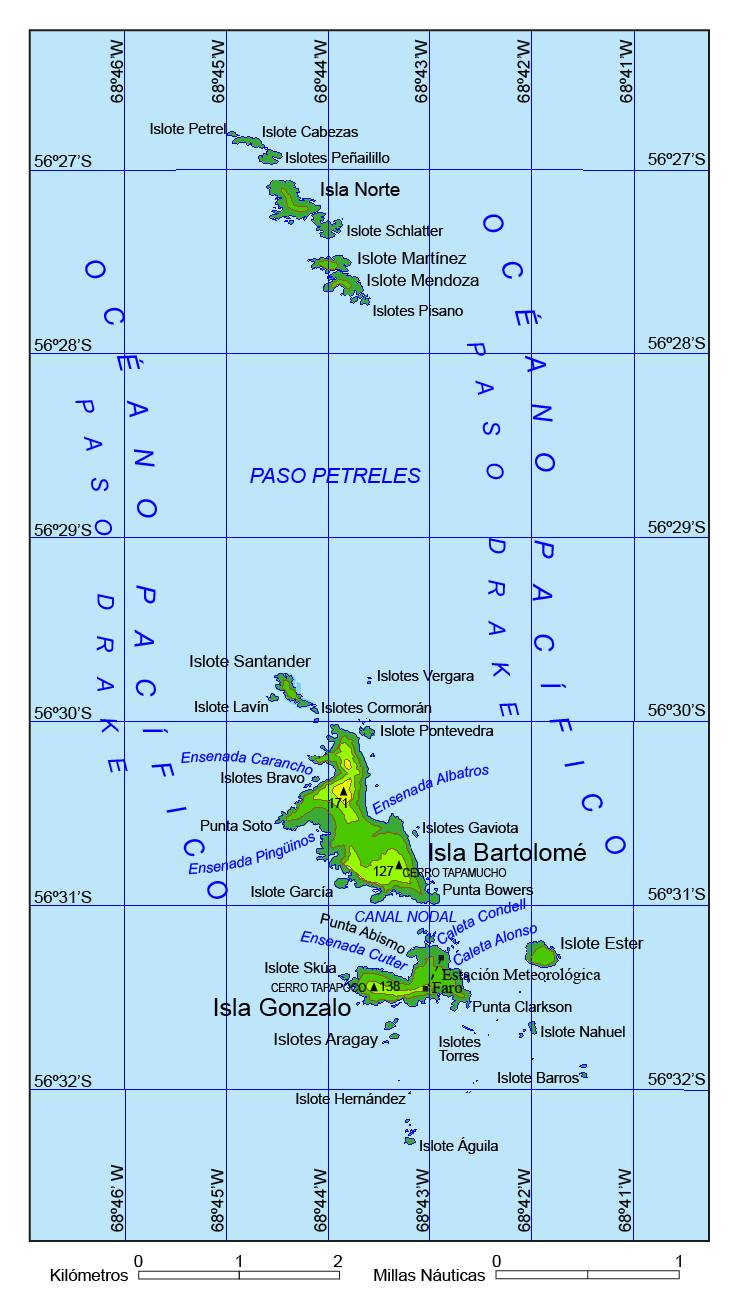
- Map of Diego Ramirez Islands

- Location within Magallanes and Chilean Antarctica Region

Geography
- Coordinates: 56°29′S 68°44′W
- Area: 1 km^{2} (0.39 sq mi)
- Length: 10.38 km (6.45 mi)
- Width: 2.25 km (1.398 mi)
- Highest point: 179 m (587 ft)

Administration
- Chile
- Region: Magallanes y Antártica Chilena
- Province: Antártica Chilena
- Commune: Cabo de Hornos

Demographics
- Population: Chilean Navy station

Additional information
- NGA UFI=-879674

The Diego Ramírez Islands (Spanish: Islas Diego Ramírez) are a small group of Chilean subantarctic islands located at the southernmost extreme of South America. They are surrounded by the Diego Ramirez Islands & Drake Passage National Park, but the land is owned by the State outside of the park, which is exclusively maritime.

== History ==
The islands were sighted on 12 February 1619 by the Spanish Garcia de Nodal expedition, and named after the cosmographer of the expedition, Diego Ramírez de Arellano. They were cited as the southernmost land mass plotted as of that time, and retained the distinction for 156 years, until the discovery of the South Sandwich Islands in 1775.

In 1892, the Chilean government rented the islands to Pedro Pablo Benavides for fishing and on condition that a lighthouse, a port, and a school would be built. Later the rent was transferred to Koenigswerther and Pasinowich.

The Chilean Navy established a meteorological station above Caleta Condell, a small cove on the northeastern side of Isla Gonzalo (Gonzalo Island), in 1957, and resupplies it several times each year. This is the southernmost inhabited outpost outside Antarctica. The next most southerly inhabited outpost is the lighthouse of Cape Horn. Cruise ships occasionally pass by on their way to and from Antarctica.

== Geography ==
The islands lie about 105 km (65 mi) west-southwest of Cape Horn and 93 km (58 mi) south-southeast of Ildefonso Islands, stretching 8 km (5 mi) north-south. They are divided into a smaller northern group with six islets, and a larger southern group, separated by a passage 3 km (1.9 mi) wide. The two largest islands, Isla Bartolomé and Isla Gonzalo, both lie in the southern group. Águila Islet (Islote Águila) is the southernmost land of the group, at latitude 56°32'15"S. The islands lie about 350 kilometres (220 mi) north of Sars Bank, a seamount that once may have been an island.

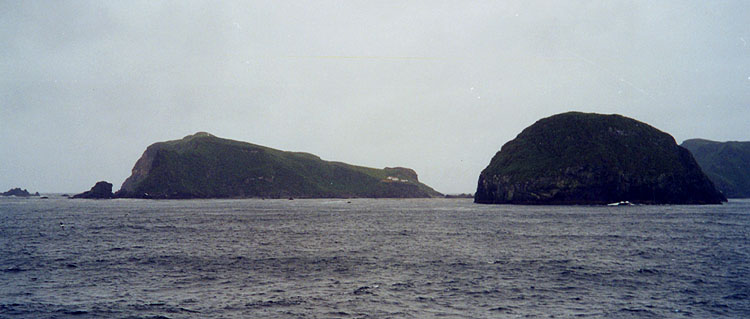
View of the Diego Ramirez Islands

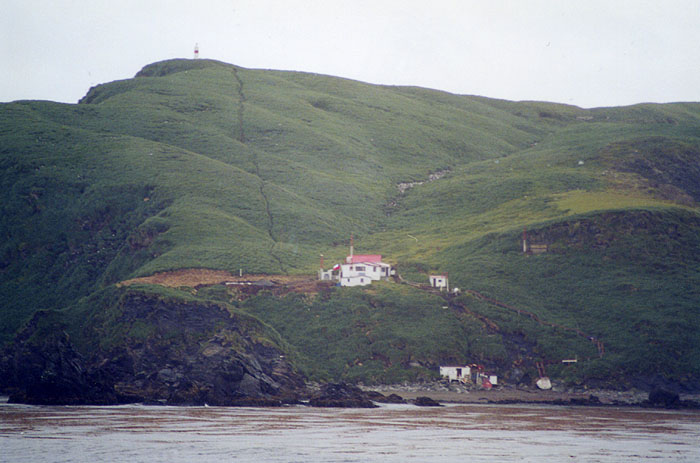
The Chilean station on Isla Gonzalo, with the beacon visible at highest point of the island

=== Islands ===
Area data are from the USGS unless otherwise specified.

Island	Area (ha)	Group
Isla Bartolomé	119.4	southern
Isla Gonzalo	39.6	southern
Islote Santander	2.9	southern
Águila Islet	2.4	southern
Islotes Torres	2.4	southern
Islote Nahuel	2.0	southern
Isla Norte	8.2	northern
Islote Mendoza	5.4	northern
Rocas Norte	3.4	northern
Islote Martinez	2.3	northern
Islotes Panailillo	0.9	northern
Islote Cabezas	0.7	northern

== Climate ==
The islands have a tundra climate (ET) with abundant precipitation. Temperatures remain chilly to cool throughout the entire year.

Climate data for Diego Ramírez Islands (Isla Gonzalo) 42 m asl (1981–2010 normals)
Month	Jan	Feb	Mar	Apr	May	Jun	Jul	Aug	Sep	Oct	Nov	Dec	Year
Record high °C (°F)	20.0 (68.0)	19.4 (66.9)	21.3 (70.3)	19.3 (66.7)	13.0 (55.4)	15.5 (59.9)	14.0 (57.2)	13.0 (55.4)	14.0 (57.2)	14.0 (57.2)	16.0 (60.8)	19.6 (67.3)	21.3 (70.3)
Mean daily maximum °C (°F)	9.5 (49.1)	9.8 (49.6)	9.2 (48.6)	8.0 (46.4)	6.6 (43.9)	5.5 (41.9)	5.3 (41.5)	5.4 (41.7)	6.1 (43.0)	6.7 (44.1)	7.6 (45.7)	8.7 (47.7)	7.4 (45.3)
Daily mean °C (°F)	7.6 (45.7)	7.9 (46.2)	7.2 (45.0)	6.1 (43.0)	4.8 (40.6)	3.7 (38.7)	3.5 (38.3)	3.5 (38.3)	4.1 (39.4)	4.8 (40.6)	5.7 (42.3)	6.7 (44.1)	5.5 (41.9)
Mean daily minimum °C (°F)	5.6 (42.1)	5.9 (42.6)	5.1 (41.2)	4.2 (39.6)	2.9 (37.2)	1.9 (35.4)	1.6 (34.9)	1.5 (34.7)	2.1 (35.8)	2.9 (37.2)	3.6 (38.5)	4.7 (40.5)	3.5 (38.3)
Record low °C (°F)	−3.0 (26.6)	−2.0 (28.4)	−3.0 (26.6)	−4.2 (24.4)	−5.0 (23.0)	−8.0 (17.6)	−7.0 (19.4)	−9.0 (15.8)	−6.8 (19.8)	−4.0 (24.8)	−3.4 (25.9)	−3.8 (25.2)	−9.0 (15.8)
Average precipitation mm (inches)	136.8 (5.39)	96.4 (3.80)	111.0 (4.37)	122.9 (4.84)	114.1 (4.49)	90.6 (3.57)	89.4 (3.52)	93.6 (3.69)	76.6 (3.02)	114.2 (4.50)	114.5 (4.51)	102.0 (4.02)	1,262.1 (49.72)
Average precipitation days	21.30	17.68	18.92	17.50	16.29	15.71	17.41	17.96	15.76	19.01	20.41	18.84	216.79
Source 1: Météo climat stats
Source 2: Météo Climat

== Environment ==
=== Important Bird Area ===
The islands have been designated as an Important Bird Area (IBA) by BirdLife International for their significant seabird breeding populations. These include colonies of macaroni and southern rockhopper penguins, grey-headed and black-browed albatrosses, and blue petrels.

In 2022, Ricardo Rozzi et al. identified the subantarctic rayadito (Aphrastura subantarctica) as a new bird species endemic to the Diego Ramírez Islands. Subantarctic rayadito individuals had been formerly identified as belonging to the species Aphrastura spinicauda (thorn-tailed rayadito).
