= Willem Schouten =

Dutch navigator (c. 1567–1625)

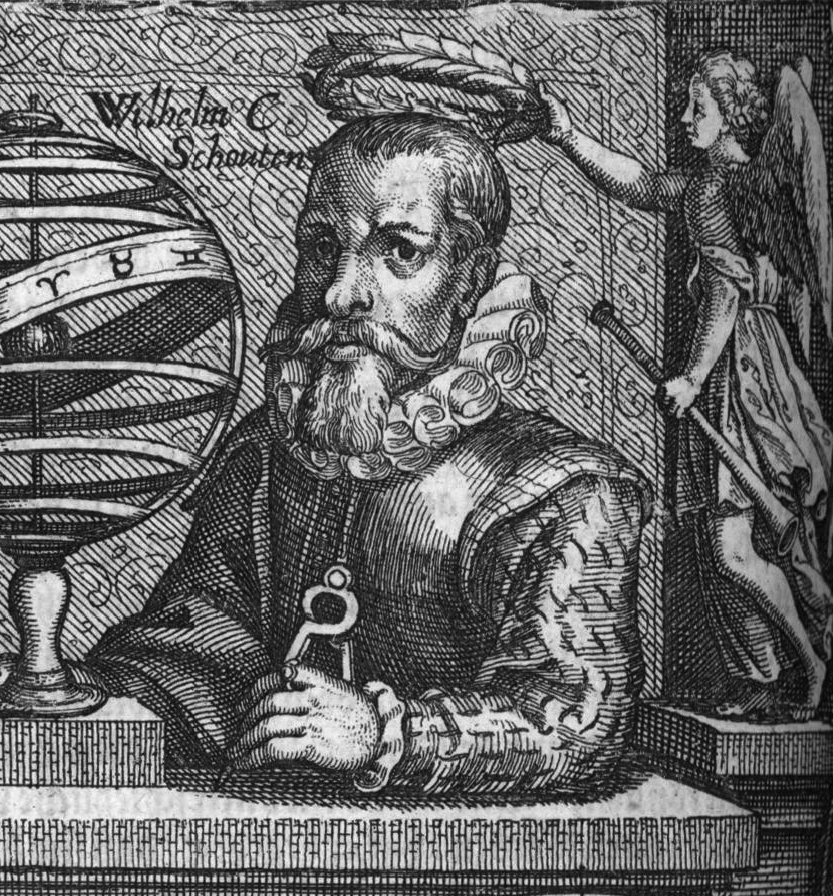
- Willem Schouten by Mattheus Merian in 1631
- Born: c. 1567; Hoorn, Holland, Seventeen Provinces
- Died: 1625; Antongil Bay, Madagascar
- Occupation: Navigator

Willem Cornelisz Schouten (c. 1567 – 1625) was a Dutch navigator for the Dutch East India Company. He was the first to sail the Cape Horn route to the Pacific Ocean.

== Biography ==
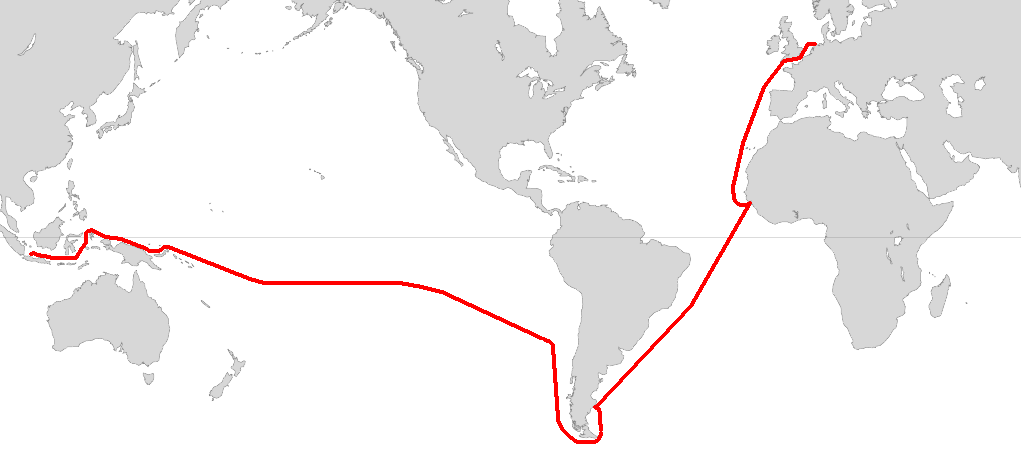
Route of the 1615–1616 voyage

Willem Cornelisz Schouten was born around 1567 in Hoorn, Holland, Seventeen Provinces.

In April 1601 Willem Schouten was skipper of the Duyfken in the 'Moluccan fleet' of Wolfert Hermansz, and participated in the Battle of Bantam.

On 1 July 1615 Willem Schouten and his younger brother Jan Schouten sailed from Texel in the Netherlands, in an expedition led by Jacob Le Maire and sponsored by Isaac Le Maire and his Australische Compagnie in equal shares with Schouten. The expedition consisted of two ships: Eendracht and Hoorn. A main purpose of the voyage was to search for Terra Australis. A further objective was to explore a western route to the Pacific Ocean to evade the trade restrictions of the Dutch East India Company (VOC) in the Spice Islands. In 1616 Schouten rounded Cape Horn, which he named after the recently destroyed ship Hoorn, (Note: There was no loss of life in the bungled cleaning/burning attempt in Patagonia of the hull of Hoorn as recorded in Schouten's journal The Relation.) and the Dutch city of Hoorn, after which the lost ship was named, the town in which Schouten himself was born. Schouten named the strait itself Le Maire Strait. Willem Schouten's younger brother Jan Schouten died on 9 March 1616 after the expedition left Juan Fernández. Willem Schouten crossed the Pacific along a southern role, encountering a number of atolls in the Tuamotu Islands, including Puka-Puka, Manihi, Rangiroa and Takapoto, followed by Tafahi, Niuafoʻou and Niuatoputapu in the Tonga Islands, and Alofi and Futuna in the Wallis and Futuna Islands. He then followed the north coasts of New Ireland and New Guinea and visited adjacent islands, including what became known as the Schouten Islands before reaching Ternate in September 1616. Eendracht completed the navigation and returned to the Netherlands on 1 July 1617.

Although he had opened an unknown route (south of Cape Horn) for the Dutch, the VOC claimed infringement of its monopoly of trade to the Spice Islands. Schouten was arrested (and later released) and his ship confiscated in Java. On his return he would sail again for the VOC, and on one of these trips he died off the coast of Madagascar in 1625.

Abel Tasman later used Schouten's charts during his exploration of the north coast of New Guinea.

== First publications ==
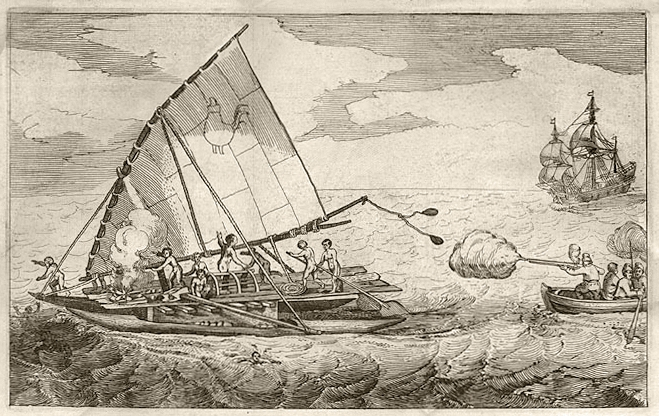
The ship De Eendracht encounters a catamaran in 1618

Schouten described his travels in the Journal, published in a Dutch edition at Amsterdam in 1618 and soon translated into several other languages.

- Dutch edition: Journael ofte beschrijvinghe van de wonderlijcke reyse, gedaen door Willem Cornelisz. Schouten van Hoorn, in de Jaren 1615. 1616. en 1617: hoe hy bezuyden de straet van Magellanes een nieuwe passagie ofte strate, tot in de groote Zuyd-zee, ontdeckt, ende voort den geheelen aerdt-kloot omgezeylt heeft: wat eylanden, vreemde volcken en wonderlijcke avontueren hem ontmoet zijn. Amsterdam: Willem Jansz. 1618.
- French edition: Journal ou Description du marveilleux voyage de Guilliaume Schouten ... Amsterdam: Willem Jansz. 1618.
- English edition: The Relation of a Wonderfull Voiage made by Willem Cornelison Schouten of Horne. Shewing how South from the Straights of Magelan in Terra Delfuego: he found and discovered a newe passage through the great South Seaes, and that way sayled round about the world. London: Imprinted by T.D. for Nathanaell Newbery. 1619.
- German edition: Journal, oder Beschreibung der wunderbaren Reise W. Schouten auss Hollandt, im Jahr 1615–17 ... Frankfurt am Main. 1619.
- Latin edition: Novi Freti, a parte meridionali freti Magellanici in Magnum Mare Australe Detectio. Diarium vel descriptio laboriosissimi et molestissimi itineris, facti a Guilielmo Cornii Schoutenio annis 1615–17... Amsterdam: Janson. 1619.

Among historians, including A. L. Rowse, there is no consensus about the authorship of this Journal. Schouten has got the credit for it, and thus the voyage has come down to us under his name. The Dutch, French, German and Latin texts all have nine engraved maps and plates, which are not present in the English version, The Relation of a Wonderfull Voiage.

== General references ==
- Barreveld, Dirk J. Tegen De Heeren Van De VOC – Isaac Le Maire En De Ontdekking Van Kaap Hoorn. The Hague: Sdu Publishers. Uitgeverij 2002.
- Bolyanatz, Alexander H. "Where Is Claes Pietersz Bay? An Episode in the History of the Sursurunga of New Ireland", in Ethnohistory 45:2 (1998), p. 319–47
- Edward Duyker (ed.) Mirror of the Australian Navigation by Jacob Le Maire: A Facsimile of the 'Spieghel der Australische Navigatie ...' Being an Account of the Voyage of Jacob Le Maire and Willem Schouten 1615–1616 published in Amsterdam in 1622, Hordern House for the Australian National Maritime Museum, Sydney, 1999, pp. 202, ISBN 1-875567-25-9.
- Quanchi, Max (2005). Historical Dictionary of the Discovery and Exploration of the Pacific Islands. The Scarecrow Press. ISBN 0810853957.
