= Cattle ranching in Spanish Florida =

Ranches in Florida in 17th century

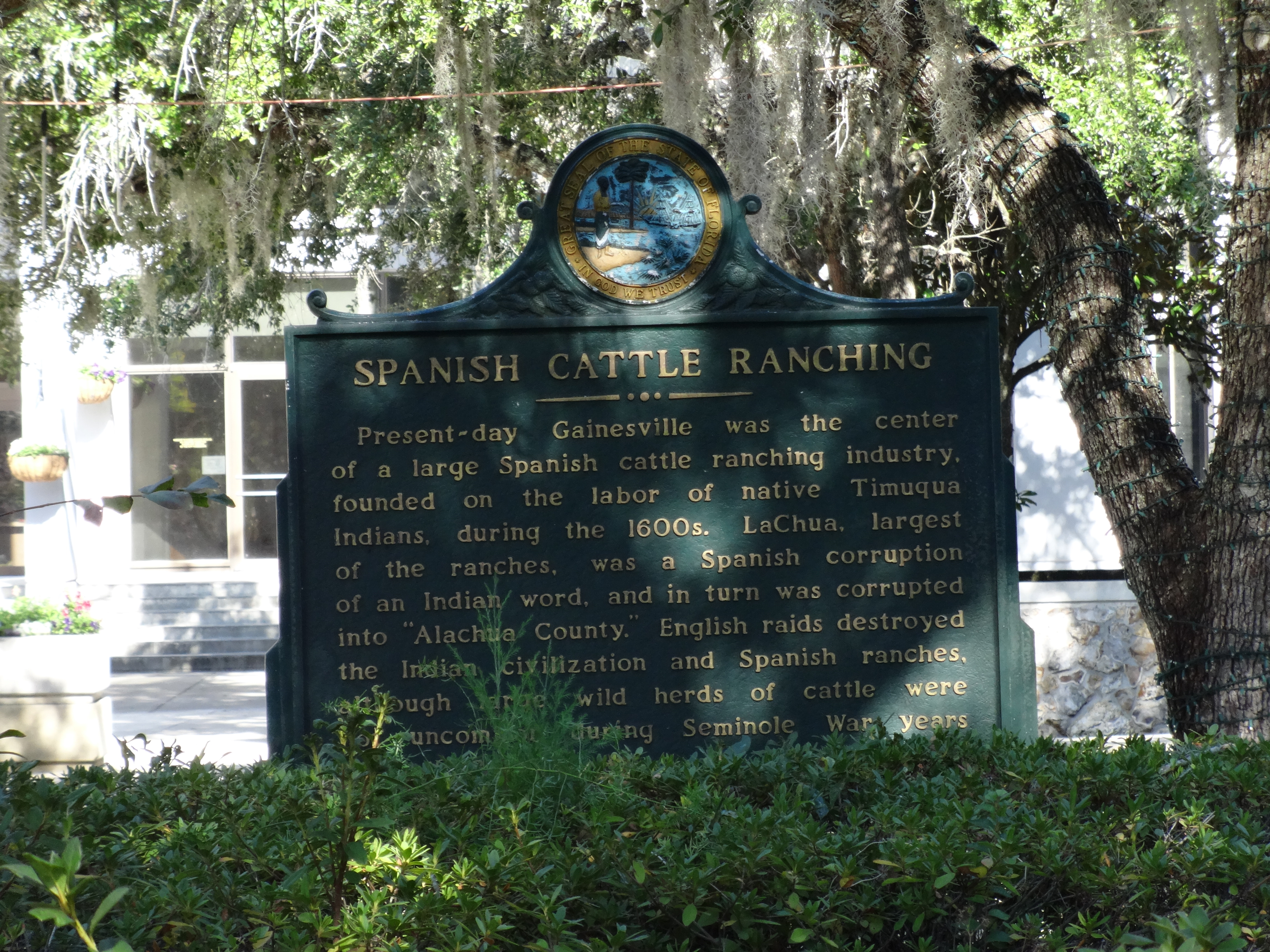
Historical marker commemorating cattle ranching in Spanish Florida

Cattle ranching was an important industry in Spanish Florida in the second half of the seventeenth century. The Spanish were in Florida for almost a century before ranching became widespread in the colony. Late in the seventeenth century, ranches were located along the middle St. Johns River, in Potano Province (present-day North Central Florida), and in Apalachee Province (the easternmost part of the Florida Panhandle known today as the Big Bend region). Ranches flourished despite conflicts with the native people of Florida. Attacks by the English colony, the Province of Carolina, and its native allies brought an abrupt end to ranching in Florida at the beginning of the eighteenth century.

== Conditions in Spanish Florida ==
Spanish Florida in the 16th and 17th centuries was a frontier colony. There were only some 2,000 Spaniards in the colony, and between 800 and 1,500 people in the Presidio of St. Augustine. Florida was a poor colony, with no source of precious metals and little else of value to the Spanish. The European population was almost completely dependent on government salaries paid from the situado, an annual subsidy provided to the colony by the Viceroyalty of New Spain. (Note: The situado, a collection of subsidies, covered the wages and rations of the soldiers stationed in the colony, ammunition and powder, gifts to the Florida natives, the salary of the governor and half of the salaries of the colony's royal treasury officials and, at times, support for missionary friars and miscellaneous other expenses. The amount of the situado varied with the size of the authorized garrison, but generally failed to keep pace with inflation.) Most goods used by the colonists had to be imported from Cuba and New Spain (Mexico). The situado was often late, sometimes by years, or even skipped. One year the ship carrying the situado was captured by a Dutch privateer. Another year, it was lost in a shipwreck.

The small amount of the situado, and the frequent delays in its provision, left the colony constantly short of supplies and funds. The government and the Spanish people of Florida bought goods in Havana on credit, but growing debt caused prices to rise and credit to dry up. The Spaniards of Florida therefore sought means to generate additional income. Products grown or gathered in Florida and shipped to Havana and Spain included ambergris that washed up on the Atlantic coast of Florida, maize and beans from Apalachee Province, and deerskins and furs obtained from Apalachicola Province. However, cattle ranching was, for a few decades, the most successful effort in Spanish Florida to supplement the meager support provided for the colony by the situado.

== Early attempts ==
Juan Ponce de León, Hernando de Soto and Tristán de Luna y Arellano all took cattle with their expeditions to Florida, in line with their intentions to found Spanish settlements there, but there is no evidence that any of those animals survived to reproduce. Pedro Menéndez de Avilés again introduced cattle to Florida when he founded St. Augustine in 1565. For the rest of the sixteenth century cattle were periodically imported from Cuba and placed on islands along the coast near St. Augustine, but shortages of pasture and fresh water and, to some extent, excessive mosquito bites, killed them. Householders in St. Augustine each kept a few cows. A few hundred head of cattle were reported in the town in 1600. The failure to establish herds of cattle meant that 2,000 ducats worth of dried beef had to be imported from Havana yearly.

Documentation about ranches in Spanish Florida is scarce, particularly in the first half of the 17th century. Arnade, writing in 1961, stated that there was no evidence of cattle ranching in Florida before 1657, and that cattle ranching in Florida began sometime between 1605 and 1655. It is now known that continuing herds were established in Florida starting in 1618, when governor Juan de Salinas began importing cattle from Cuba in sufficient numbers.

Expanses of vacant land became available in Spanish Florida as natives in mission villages died in frequent epidemics, or left their villages to avoid the repartimiento, in which men from mission villages were required to work, without pay, for the Spanish. The Saltwater and Freshwater Timucua villages along the St. Johns River were largely empty by 1617, leaving unused land that could serve for cattle ranches. The earliest reference to a cattle ranch in Florida is for one in Potano Province, possibly dating to the mid-1620s, but Hann speculates that earlier ranches had been established closer to St. Augustine.

== Growth ==
Luis Benedit y Horruytiner became governor of Florida in 1633. He encouraged criollos (people of European descent born in the Americas) in St. Augustine to move to the inland provinces to start farming and ranching, using the native population as laborers. Horruytiner made a significant number of grants of land during his term as governor that were probably used as ranches. (Note: Land in and around St. Augustine had been granted outright to Spanish settlers in the early days of the colony, but, by 1600, all remaining land in the colony belonged to native chiefdoms, or to the Spanish Crown, which reserved the land for the free use of the natives. Government policy was to not grant ownership of such land, but rather to grant, in the case of ranches, grazing rights on circular estancias eight leagues in diameter, at least three leagues from any occupied village.) Horruytiner stayed in Florida after his term as governor ended, and his family later owned several cattle ranches. A dozen of so criollo families holding administrative and military positions in St. Augustine obtained land grants. Construction of the Castillo de San Marcos in St. Augustine, which began in 1672, created an increased demand for food for the workers. Pablo de Hita y Salazar, governor of Spanish Florida from 1675 to 1680, also freely distributed land grants, for which he was reprimanded by the Spanish Crown. He also stayed in Florida and became a cattle rancher after leaving office.

The best potential pastures in Spanish Florida were grasslands in the Potano Province, 15 leagues west of the St. Johns River. The Potano people had regularly burned their lands to clear them for agriculture and to create better conditions for hunting. The repeated fires converted woodlands to savannas of wiregrass (Aristida stricta). The population of Potano Province started falling soon after the first missions were established there in 1606. Two of the early missions in Potano, San Miguel de Potano and San Buenaventura de Potano, disappeared from Spanish records after 1613, likely because of loss of population. Repeated epidemics struck Spanish Florida, including several between 1649 and 1655, leading governor Diego de Rebolledo to observe in 1657 that plague and smallpox had left few natives alive in Timucua Province (which by then included Potano Province). (Note: The Spanish used the term "province" for the territory of a tribe or chiefdom. There was no fixed definition of province boundaries. As tribes and chiefdoms lost population and importance, the provinces associated with them would no longer appear in the records. Other provinces expanded to take in their territories. Most of the people taken into the mission system were Timucua-speakers. The Timucua-speakers, most of whom were brought into the mission system in the late 16th and early 17th centuries, were initially seen by the Spanish as living in a dozen or so provinces, including the Timucua Province (in its restricted sense, north of the Santa Fe River, between the St. Johns River and the Suwannee River) and Potano Province. During the 17th century, as Timucuan populations declined and the locations of Spanish missions were consolidated along the route between St. Augustine and Apalachee, most of these provinces were gradually consolidated in Spanish usage into a Timucua Province stretching from the Atlantic Ocean to the Aucilla River.)

== Operations ==
Cattle on ranches were allowed to freely browse in the woods for most of the year. They were gathered up and confined in pens in the spring, where calves were branded, and a portion were selected to go to slaughter. Most of the cattle to be slaughtered were driven to St. Augustine. The cattle sent to St. Augustine initially provided meat for the garrison, with any surplus meat sold to civilians in the city. As ranch production increased, surplus hides, tallow and dried meat became available for export. Some was sent to Spain on the one ship a year that was permitted to sail from St. Augustine to Spain. The rest was shipped to Havana and other cities in the Caribbean. Juan Márquez Cabrera, governor of Florida from 1680 to 1687, ordered that cattle ready for sale were to be slaughtered at a government slaughterhouse in St. Augustine, at a fixed price, and with the payment of a tax.

Ranches drew on several sources for workers. Some were repartimiento (involuntary unpaid draft) laborers, procured through the caciques of mission villages. Mission population declines led to ranchers contracting with natives as day laborers, with resettlement of the workers on ranches. Full-time ranch hands included both contract workers and slaves. In the 1660s a company of soldiers was sent from Mexico to Florida to fill up the ranks of the garrison. The Mexican soldiers were mestizos or mulattos, and were regarded in St. Augustine as unfit to be soldiers. Many of them ended up working on ranches.

Ranches and farms in Spanish Florida paid a tithe, or tax in kind, of two-and-one-half percent of their produce. Governor Hita y Salazar, needing funds for construction of the Castillo de San Marcos, and for founding new Spanish towns at strategic points in Florida, introduced new taxes on farms and ranches, including an annual tax of 50 pesos for each ranch, and a charge of 50 pesos per league (Note: League was used both as a measure of length, and as a measure of area. It is not known which meaning was used to calculate this tax.) to make the grazing licenses inheritable. The new taxes brought in 2,500 pesos for the government between 1677 and 1685. Inspired by the new taxes imposed by the Spanish government, caciques (native chiefs) began levying a charge on the use of old fields in their chiefdoms, which they called "tribute".

== Menéndez Márquez family ==
Foremost among the criollos engaged in cattle ranching in Spanish Florida was the Menéndez Márquez family. The family was descended from Pedro Menéndez Márquez, nephew of Pedro Menéndez de Avilés, the founder of Spanish Florida. Pedro Menéndez Márquez was the third royal governor of Spanish Florida. Pedro Menéndez Márquez's great-nephew (or, possibly, his grandson), Francisco Menéndez Márquez, was the Royal Treasurer-Steward for Spanish Florida from 1628 until 1637, and again from 1639 until his death in 1649. When governor Benito Ruíz de Salazar Vallecilla was suspended from office in 1646, Francisco Menéndez Márquez and acting accountant Pedro Benedit Horruytiner acted as co-governors until Salazar Vallecilla was returned to office in 1648. (Note: On the death or absence of a governor, the treasury officials often jointly governed Florida until a new governor appointed by the king could take up his duties. Francisco thus served as interim co-governor with Horruytiner after the suspension of Salazar Vallecilla in 1646-1648, and his father, Juan, did so (with factor/overseer Alonso de las Alas and accountant Bartolomé de Argüelles) in 1595-1597. Other joint interim governorships occurred in 1612-1613 and 1631-1633.)

By the 1640s Potano Province had become largely depopulated and subsumed into Timucua Province. Francisco started cattle ranching in the abandoned Potano lands, with the approval of Timucua chief Lúcas Menéndez, probably in 1646 or 1647, while acting as co-governor. By 1649 the ranch was worth 8,000 pesos and earning 700 pesos a year. A few years after Francisco's death, the royal treasury in St. Augustine was audited, and it was found that between 16,000 and 20,000 pesos were missing (Francisco's salary as treasurer was 1,470 pesos a year). Bushnell calculates that 6,000 pesos would have purchased about 200 head of cattle, five horses, and two slaves to serve as ranch hands. This sum accounts for much of the 16,000 to 20,000 pesos that Francisco had "borrowed" from the royal treasury. Francisco's family repaid about three-quarters of the missing funds, and was allowed to repay the balance over six years.

Cattle ranching boomed in Spanish Florida in the latter part of the 17th century. Francisco's son, Tomás Menéndez Márquez, and Tomás's son Francisco II, founded or bought most of the ranches located between the St. Johns River and the Potano missions (in what is now western Alachua County). The best known of the ranches was La Chua, on the north side of what is now known as Paynes Prairie. (Note: A Spanish map from 1764 shows eight ranches of 25 square leagues each west of the St. Johns River. Five of those ranches, including la Chua, were claimed by the Menéndez Márquez family. By then, however, all of the ranches had been outside of Spanish control for 60 years.) Tomás also formed alliances with other cattle ranchers. Several of his children married into other ranching families.

As did other ranches, the Menéndez Márquez ranches sent cattle to St. Augustine. Cattle were sometimes driven to Apalachee Province, as well. A port called San Martin was established in the early 1670s on the Suwannee River, and Tomás shipped hides, dried meat and tallow to Havana from that port. Tomás owned a ship which was engaged in the trade between San Martin, Havana and San Marcos in Apalachee Province.

== Conflict with chiefdoms ==
The natives of Spanish Florida did not take well to cattle ranching in their territories. Resistance to the ranches was part of an ongoing struggle between the "republic of Indians" and the "republic of Spaniards" over the control of land and of the labor of the natives. That struggle was complicated by differences between caciques and "common" natives, and by missionaries supporting native complaints against Spanish ranchers and the Spanish government.

Trouble over cattle started with the founding of the colony. At the very beginning of the colony, cattle had to be placed on an island on the coast, where they were protected from native attacks by trained attack dogs. Reports of natives complaining about cattle destroying crops occurred throughout the 17th century. In 1694, the residents of San Diego de Salamototo, the ferry station on the St. Johns River for the trail connecting St. Augustine and Apalachee, were severely short of food after cattle had destroyed their crops. Timucuas sometimes killed cattle to protect their fields, with the earliest report of such killing dating from 1614. During the Timucua Rebellion in 1658, Timucuas raided the Menéndez Márquez family's la Chua ranch, killing four ranch hands (two on the trail and two at the ranch) and all the cattle they could find. Franciscan missionaries to the Apalachee and Timucua resisted Spanish settlements and ranches near native towns as threats to the conversion of natives, as well as threats to the power of the caciques.

Another source of conflict was the recruitment of natives as ranch hands. The power of the caciques of Apalachee and Timucua chiefdoms was dependent on their control of land and labor. A sufficient number of subjects working in the fields was required for the production of agricultural surpluses, which gave caciques the means to compete against other caciques, and facilitated the acquisition of prestige goods. Shortages of labor available to ranches through the repartimiento system led to ranchers offering higher wages to voluntary contract workers. This in turn led native men to leave their villages and take up residence on ranches, which deprived their caciques of their labor in the village's fields, and of their availability to meet the repartimiento demands of the Spanish government. It also removed the native men and their families from the Christianizing efforts of the missionaries.

== Prosperity, decline and sudden destruction ==
Late in the 17th century, there were 34 permanent ranches in Spanish Florida. In 1698 and 1699, those 34 ranches paid a tax in kind of 222 head of cattle. The largest ranch, la Chua, paid a tax of 77 head of cattle. The tax rate on the produce of ranches ("fruits of the land") was two-and-a-half percent. A paid tax of 222 head of cattle implies that 8,880 calves were born in those two years, including 3,080 calves born on the la Chua ranch alone. In 1763, British colonial official James Robertson noted that, before the destruction of the Spanish missions in Florida at the beginning of the 18th century, cattle abounded in Florida, and one Spaniard (presumably, Tomás Menéndez Márquez, whose family owned la Chua) owned 7,000 head.

Ranching had become less profitable with time. A beef steer was worth 21 pesos in 1651, but only six pesos in 1689. The value of a horse fell from 100 pesos in 1651 to 25 pesos in 1682. A pair of draft oxen was worth 80 pesos in 1651, but only 25 pesos in 1682. Moreover, the abundance of cattle attracted unwanted attention. French pirates based on Anclote Key on the Gulf coast of Florida raided Spanish ranches in 1682 and 1684, reaching the la Chua ranch in the Potano region both times. Runaway slaves and natives who had left their mission villages killed cattle for food. Native allies of the English Province of South Carolina who participated in the siege of St. Augustine in 1702, retreated through the Potano region, taking cattle, horses and Timucua captives with them to Carolina. By the first years of the 18th century, raids by pirates, rustlers, and the English had severely affected ranching in Spanish Florida. A blockhouse was constructed at la Chua and soldiers were stationed there to help work the ranch and protect it. The pressure of further raids forced the defenders to burn the blockhouse in 1706 and retreat to St. Augustine. The Spanish had lost control of Florida outside of the immediate vicinity of St. Augustine, including the cattle ranches.

== See also ==
- Florida Cracker cattle
- Florida Cracker Horse
- Agriculture in Florida

== Sources ==
- Arnade, Charles W. (1961). "Cattle Raising in Spanish Florida, 1513-1763". Agricultural History. 35 (3): 116–124. ISSN 0002-1482. JSTOR 3740622.
- Blanton, Justin B. (2014). "The Role of Cattle Ranching in the 1656 Timucuan Rebellion: A Struggle for Land, Labor, and Chiefly Power". The Florida Historical Quarterly. 92 (4): 667–684. ISSN 0015-4113. JSTOR 43488429.
- Borgen, Linda Suzanne Cecelia (2011). Prelude to Rebellion: Diego de Rebolledo vs. Lúcas Menéndez in Mid-17th Century Spanish Florida (PDF) (Thesis). Pensacola, Florida: University of West Florida.
- Bushnell, Amy (1978). "The Menéndez Marquéz Cattle Barony at La Chua and the Determinants of Economic Expansion in Seventeenth-Century Florida". The Florida Historical Quarterly. 56 (4): 407–431. ISSN 0015-4113. JSTOR 30150328.
- Bushnell, Amy (1981). The King's Coffer: Proprietors of the Spanish Florida Treasury 1565-1702. Gainesville, Florida: University Presses of Florida. ISBN 0-8130-0690-2.
- Bushnell, Amy Turner (1991). "Thomas Menéndez Márquez: Criolla, Cattleman, and Contador/Tomás Menéndez Márquez: Criolla, Ganadero y Contador Real". In Ann L. Henderson and Gary L. Mormino (ed.). Spanish Pathways in Florida/Caminos Españoles en La Florida. Sarasota, Florida: Pineapple Press. pp. 118–139. ISBN 1-56164-003-4.
- Hann, John H. (1996). A History of the Timucua Indians and Missions. Gainesville, Florida: University Press of Florida. ISBN 0-8130-1424-7.
