= La Chua ranch =

Cattle ranch in Spanish Florida

La Chua Ranch
- Interactive map of La Chua Ranch
- 29.6069°N 82.2991°W
- Location: Paynes Prairie

History
- Founded: Late-1640’s — 1675
- Demolished: 1706

Site notes
- Elevation: 79 feet (24 meters)

The La Chua ranch was the largest cattle ranch in Spanish Florida in the 17th century. Cattle ranching became an important part of the economy of Spanish Florida over the course of the 17th century. The La Chua ranch was founded in the middle of the 17th century, and by the end of that century accounted for one-third of the cattle in the colony. Raids by the English of the Province of Carolina and their native allies led to the abandonment of the La Chua ranch early in the 18th century.

== Menéndez Márquez family ==
Francisco Menéndez Márquez was a member of a prominent criollo family in Spanish Florida. He and his descendants became foremost among the criollos engaged in cattle ranching in Spanish Florida. Francisco's great-uncle (or, possibly, his grandfather) was Pedro Menéndez Márquez, nephew of Pedro Menéndez de Avilés, the founder of Spanish Florida. Pedro Menéndez Márquez was the third royal governor of Spanish Florida. Francisco's father, Juan Menéndez Márquez (Pedro's nephew, or, possibly, illegitimate son), married Pedro's niece, María Menéndez y Posada. María's father, Pedro de Posada, had been appointed tesorero real (royal treasurer) of Florida, but died in 1592 before he could assume the duties of the position. Juan, as the betrothed of Posada's daughter, inherited the position and served as royal treasurer from 1593 until his death in 1627. Juan's son, Francisco Menéndez Márquez, succeeded his father as royal treasurer-steward (Note: Provinces in the Spanish Empire had a royal treasury controlled by a set of officiales reales (royal officials). The officials of the royal treasury included up to four positions: a tesorero (treasurer), the senior official who guarded money on hand and made payments; a contador (accountant or comptroller), who recorded income and payments, maintained records, and interpreted royal instructions; a factor, who guarded weapons and supplies belonging to the king, and disposed of tribute collected in the province; and a veedor (overseer), who was responsible for contacts with native inhabitants of the province, and collected the king's share of any war booty. The factor and veedor were combined as a factor/veedor from the establishment of Spanish Florida in 1565. In 1628 the position of factor/veedor was eliminated in Florida, and the treasurer became known as a treasurer-steward. The treasury officials were appointed by the king, and were largely independent of the authority of the governor. On the death, unauthorized absence, retirement or removal of a governor, the treasury officials would jointly govern the province until a new governor appointed by the king could take up his duties. Treasury officials were supposed to be paid out of the income from the province, but Spanish Florida had almost no income, and the salaries of the treasury officials were paid out of the situado, a royal subsidy. Treasury officials were normally prohibited from engaging in income-producing activities, but those restrictions were partially lifted and largely ignored in Florida.) of Spanish Florida, serving from 1628 until 1637, and again from 1639 until his death in 1649. When governor Benito Ruíz de Salazar Vallecilla was suspended from office in 1646, Francisco Menéndez Márquez and acting accountant Pedro Benedit Horruytiner acted as co-governors until Salazar Vallecilla was returned to office in 1648. (Note: On the death or absence of a governor, the treasury officials often jointly governed Florida until a new governor appointed by the king could take up his duties. Francisco thus served as interim co-governor with Horruytiner after the suspension of Salazar Vallecilla in 1646-1648, and his father, Juan, did so (with factor/overseer Alonso de las Alas and accountant Bartolomé de Argüelles) in 1595-1597. Other joint interim governorships occurred in 1612-1613 and 1631-1633.)

Francisco started cattle ranching in Potano Province with the approval of Timucua chief Lúcas Menéndez, chief of the Timucua Province, which had expanded to include Potano Province. (Note: The best potential pastures in Spanish Florida were grasslands in Potano Province, 15 leagues west of the St. Johns River. The Potanos had regularly burned the land to clear it for agriculture and hunting, creating open savannahs of wiregrass (Aristida stricta). Attacks by non-mission natives and epidemics had greatly reduced the Potano population by the 1640s, and the province had been subsumed into the neighboring Timucua Province.) That ranch was probably founded in 1646 or 1647, while Francisco was acting as co-governor of Florida. The location of that first ranch is not known. By 1649 the ranch was worth 8,000 pesos and earning 700 pesos a year. A few years after Francisco's death, the royal treasury in St. Augustine was audited, and it was found that between 16,000 and 20,000 pesos were missing (Francisco's salary as treasurer had been 1,470 pesos a year). Bushnell calculates that 6,000 pesos would have purchased about 200 head of cattle, five horses, and two slaves to serve as ranch hands. This sum accounts for much of the 16,000 to 20,000 pesos that Francisco had "borrowed" from the royal treasury. Francisco had used the King's money to finance his ranch. Francisco's family repaid about three-quarters of the missing funds, and was allowed to repay the balance over six years.

== Location ==
The La Chua ranch was located on and about what is now known as Paynes Prairie, southeast of present-day Gainesville. The hacienda headquarters has been identified with an archaeological site on the northern rim of Payne's Prairie, overlooking the Alachua Sink (a sinkhole that drains Paynes Prairie). (Note: Chua may have been the Timucua language word for sinkhole. Lieutenant Diego Peña reported in 1716 that he passed by springs named Aquilachua, Usichua, Usiparachua, and Afanochua while traveling through what is now Suwannee County. In the twentieth-century, anthropologist J. Clarence Simpson assumed that the named springs were in fact sinkholes.) The earliest possible date for the founding of the La Chua ranch is in the late 1640s, but the first mention of its existence was in 1675, and the name did appear in the records until 1682.

== Prosperity ==
Cattle ranching boomed in Spanish Florida in the latter part of the 17th century. Francisco's son, Tomás Menéndez Márquez, and Tomás's son, Francisco II, founded or bought most of the ranches located between the St. Johns River and the Potano missions (in what is now western Alachua County). Tomás also formed alliances with other cattle ranchers. Several of his children married into other ranching families. As did other ranches, the Menéndez Márquez ranches sent cattle to St. Augustine. Cattle were sometimes driven to Apalachee Province, as well. A port called San Martin was established in the early 1670s on the Suwannee River, 4 leagues from the mouth of the river and 14 leagues from La Chua. Tomás shipped hides, dried meat and tallow to Havana from that port. Tomás owned a ship which was engaged in the trade between San Martin, Havana, and San Marcos in Apalachee Province.

Ranches and farms in Spanish Florida were taxed at two-and-one-half percent of their produce ("fruits of the land"), which for a cattle ranch meant that two-and-one-half percent of the calves born each year were sent to St. Augustine. Late in the 17th century, there were 34 permanent cattle ranches in Spanish Florida. In 1698 and 1699, those 34 ranches paid a tax in kind of 222 head of cattle. The largest ranch, La Chua, paid a tax of 77 head of cattle, 35% of all calves paid in tax that year. A paid tax of 222 head of cattle implies that 8,880 calves were born in those two years, including 3,080 calves born on the La Chua ranch alone. In 1763, British colonial official James Robertson noted that, before the destruction of the Spanish missions in Florida at the beginning of the 18th century, cattle abounded in Florida, and one Spaniard (presumably, Tomás Menéndez Márquez) owned 7,000 head.

== Attacks ==
The La Chua ranch was attacked during the Timucua Rebellion of 1656. Juan Menéndez Márquez, the oldest son of Francisco, was managing the ranch at the time. (Note: Jerald Milanich states that Juan's younger brother, Tomás, was the one involved in this incident, but other sources say it was Juan, and Tomás would have been only 13 years old at the time.) One of the leaders of the rebellion was Lúcas Menéndez, chief of San Martín de Timucua and paramount chief of the Timucua Province, and probable godson of Francisco. Lúcas sent a letter to Juan in St. Augustine, warning him to not visit the ranch. Juan could not read the Timucua language, however, and went to the ranch unaware of the danger. Lúcas Menéndez ordered his people to kill all Spaniards, except for missionaries. Couriers carrying this order found two workers from the La Chua ranch, a Spaniard and a Tabasco Mexican, on the road and killed them. Lúcas led a raiding party to the La Chua hacienda. At the hacienda the Timucuas killed a Spanish soldier who had traveled with Juan from St. Augustine and two African slaves that belonged to the ranch. The Timucuas also killed all the cattle they could find, and burned the hacienda. Lúcas protected Juan, apparently because Juan's father Francisco had been generous to him, and sent Juan to St. Augustine with an escort.

The prosperity of the ranches attracted unwanted attention. French pirates based on Anclote Key raided up the Suwannee River in 1682. They reached the La Chua hacienda at 2:00 AM and captured Tomás, his son-in-law Juan de Hita, and four servants. The pirates demanded 150 head of cattle and money for a ransom, and began withdrawing to Anclote Key. Three Timucua chiefs ambushed the pirates and freed Tomás and Juan de Hita before any ransom was paid. In 1684 pirates again attacked La Chua, by way of the Amajuro River (probably the Withlacoochee River).

== Decline ==
Ranching became less profitable with time. A beef steer was worth 21 pesos in 1651, but only six pesos in 1689. The value of a horse fell from 100 pesos in 1651 to 25 pesos in 1682. A pair of draft oxen was worth 80 pesos in 1651, but only 25 pesos in 1682. Starting in the 1680s the English of the Province of Carolina and their native allies began raiding in Florida. Run-away slaves and non-mission Indians stole cattle for food. By the first years of the 18th century, the depredations of the pirates, rustlers, and the English and their native allies had severely affected ranching in Spanish Florida. Control of the Apalachee and Guale provinces was lost due to English-backed raids. A blockhouse was constructed at La Chua and soldiers were stationed there to help work the ranch and protect it from raiders. The pressure of further raids forced the defenders to burn the blockhouse in 1706 and retreat to St. Augustine. The La Chua ranch was abandoned.

== Sources ==
- Arnade, Charles W. (1961). "Cattle Raising in Spanish Florida, 1513-1763". Agricultural History. 35 (3): 116–124. ISSN 0002-1482. JSTOR 3740622.
- Baker, Henry A. (June 1993). "Spanish Ranching and the Alachua Sink Site: A Preliminary Report". The Florida Anthropologist. 46 (2): 82–100 – via University of Florida Digital Collections.
- Blanton, Justin B. (2014). "The Role of Cattle Ranching in the 1656 Timucuan Rebellion: A Struggle for Land, Labor, and Chiefly Power". The Florida Historical Quarterly. 92 (4): 667–684. ISSN 0015-4113. JSTOR 43488429.
- Borgen, Linda Suzanne Cecelia (2011). Prelude to Rebellion: Diego de Rebolledo vs. Lúcas Menéndez in Mid-17th Century Spanish Florida (PDF) (Thesis). Pensacola, Florida: University of West Florida.
- Bushnell, Amy (1978). "The Menéndez Marquéz Cattle Barony at La Chua and the Determinants of Economic Expansion in Seventeenth-Century Florida". The Florida Historical Quarterly. 56 (4): 407–431. ISSN 0015-4113. JSTOR 30150328.
- Bushnell, Amy (1981). The King's Coffer: Proprietors of the Spanish Florida Treasury 1565-1702. Gainesville, Florida: University Presses of Florida. ISBN 0-8130-0690-2.
- Bushnell, Amy Turner (1991). "Thomas Menéndez Márquez: Criolla, Cattleman, and Contador/Tomás Menéndez Márquez: Criolla, Ganadero y Contador Real". In Ann L. Henderson and Gary L. Mormino (ed.). Spanish Pathways in Florida/Caminos Españoles en La Florida. Sarasota, Florida: Pineapple Press. pp. 118–139. ISBN 1-56164-003-4.
- Bushnell, Amy Turner (1994). "Situado and Sabana: Spain's Support System for the Presidio and Mission Provinces of Florida". Anthropological Papers. 74. American Museum of Natural History. hdl:2246/269. ISBN 0-8203-1712-8. ISSN 0065-9452.
- Chipman, Donald E. (2005). Moctezuma's Children: Aztec Royalty under Spanish Rule, 1520–1700 (Individual e-book (no page numbers) ed.). Austin, Texas: University of Texas Press. ISBN 978-0-292-78264-8.
- Hann, John H. (1996). A History of the Timucua Indians and Missions. Gainesville, Florida: University Press of Florida. ISBN 0-8130-1424-7.
- McEwan, Bonnie G. (1993). "Hispanic Life on the Seventeenth-Century Florida Frontier". In McEwan, Bonnie G. (ed.). The Spanish Missions of La Florida. Gainesville, Florida: University Press of Florida. pp. 295–321. ISBN 978-0-8130-1232-2.
- Milanich, Jerald T. (1996). The Timucua. Oxford, UK: Blackwell Publications. ISBN 1-55786-488-8.
- Parry, John Horace (1966). The Spanish Seaborne Empire (First paperback (1990) ed.). Berkeley, California: University of California Press. ISBN 0-520-07140-9.
- Worth, John E. (1998a). The Timucuan Chiefdoms of Spanish Florida, Volume 1: Assimilation. Gainesville, Florida: University Press of Florida. ISBN 0-8130-1574-X.
- Worth, John E. (1998b). The Timucuan Chiefdoms of Spanish Florida, Volume 2: Resistance and Destruction. Gainesville, Florida: University Press of Florida. ISBN 0-8130-1575-8.
