= List of colonial governors of Florida =

The colonial governors of Florida governed Florida during its colonial period (before 1821). The first European known to arrive there was Juan Ponce de León in 1513, but the governorship did not begin until 1565, when Pedro Menéndez de Avilés founded St. Augustine and was declared Governor and Adelantado of Florida. This district was subordinated to the Viceroyalty of New Spain. In 1763, following the transfer of Florida to Britain, the territory was divided into West Florida and East Florida, with separate governors. This division was maintained when Spain resumed control of Florida in 1783, and continued as provincial divisions with the Spanish Constitution of 1812. The Spanish transferred control of Florida to the United States in 1821, and the organized, incorporated Florida Territory was established on March 30, 1822. This became the modern State of Florida on March 3, 1845.

Flag of New Spain

== First Spanish period, 1565–1763 ==
| Name | Term | Notes |
|---|---|---|
| Pedro Menéndez de Avilés | Sep 1565 – Sep 1574 | Founder of St. Augustine and Adelantado of the first Florida government; died in office. Lieutenant governors: Esteban de las Alas (Oct 1566 – Aug 1570; deserted); Pedro Menéndez de Avilés II (Aug 1570 – 1571; killed) |
| Diego de Velasco | 1574 – 1576 | Acting; previously lieutenant governor (Jul 1571 – 30 Apr 1575) |
| Hernando de Miranda and Alonso de Solís (murdered) | 1576 | |
| Gutierre de Miranda | 1576 – 1577 | acting |
| Pedro Menéndez Márquez and Rodrigo del Junco (the latter held the governorship between 1590 and 1592) | 1577 – 1594 | Beginning of the Spanish missions to the Timucua. Vicente González (1577–1578) and Tomás Bernaldo de Quirós (1578–1579) served as interim governors during Márquez' absence. Francisco de Salazar was interim governor from 1583 to 1587, and Juan de Posada governed Florida from 1588 to 1589. |
| Domingo Martínez de Avendaño | 1594 – 1595 | |
| Alonso de las Alas, Bartolomé de Argüelles, and Juan Menéndez Márquez | 1595 – 1597 | acting |
| Gonzalo Méndez de Canço | 1597 – 1603 | Pedro Pertrene and Juan García de Naiva served as interim governors in 1598. |
| Pedro de Ibarra | 1603 – 1610 | |
| Juan Fernández de Olivera | 1610 – 1612 | |
| Juan de Arrazola and Joseph de Olivera (royal officials). | 1612 – 1613 | acting |
| Juan Treviño de Guillamas | 1613 – 1618 | |
| Juan de Salinas | 1618 – 1624 | Lieutenant governor: Alonso de Pastrana (8 Nov 1622 – ?) |
| Luis de Rojas y Borja | 1624 – 1630 | Lieutenant governor: Alonso de Pastrana (17 Aug 1627 – ?) |
| Andrés Rodríguez de Villegas | 1630 – 1631 | |
| Nicolás Ponce de León and Eugenio de Espinosa | 1631 – 1633 | acting |
| Luis de Horruytiner | 1633 – 1638 | Apalachee missions established |
| Damián de Vega Castro y Pardo | 1638 – 1645 | |
| Benito Ruíz de Salazar Vallecilla | 1645 – 1646 | |
| Francisco Menéndez Márquez and Pedro Benedit Horruytiner (royal officials) | 1646 – 1648 | acting |
| Benito Ruíz de Salazar Vallecilla | 1648 – 1651 | |
| Nicolás Ponce de León | 1651 | acting |
| Pedro Horruytiner Benedit | 1651 – 1654 | acting |
| Diego de Rebolledo y Suárez de Aponte | 1654 – 1659 | |
| Alonso de Aránguiz y Cortés | 1659 – 1663 | |
| Nicolás Ponce de León II | 1663 – 1664 | acting |
| Francisco de la Guerra y de la Vega | 1664 – 1671 | |
| Manuel de Çendoya | 1671 – 1673 | beginning the built of the Castillo de San Marcos |
| Nicolás Ponce de León II | 1673 – 1675 | acting |
| Pablo de Hita y Salazar | 1675 – 1680 | |
| Juan Márquez Cabrera | 1680 – 1687 | |
| Pedro de Aranda y Avellaneda | 1687 | acting |
| Diego de Quiroga y Losada | 1687 – 1693 | |
| Laureano de Torres y Ayala, Marquis of Casa Torres | 1693 – 1699 | finishing the built of the Castillo de San Marcos; Later served as royal governor of Cuba |
| José de Zúñiga y la Cerda | 1699 – 1706 | later served as governor of Cartagena de Indias |
| Francisco de Córcoles y Martínez | 1706 – 1716 | |
| Pedro de Olivera y Fullana | 1716 | |
| Juan de Ayala y Escobar | 1716 – 1718 | acting |
| Antonio de Benavides | 1718 – 1734 | |
| Francisco del Moral y Sánchez | 1734 – 1737 | |
| Manuel Joseph de Justís | 1737 | acting |
| Manuel de Montiano | 1737 – 1749 | |
| Melchor de Navarrete | 1749 – 1752 | |
| Fulgencio García de Solís | 1752 – 1755 | acting |
| Alonso Fernández de Heredia | 1755 – 1758 | |
| Lucas Fernando de Palacio y Valenzuela | 1758 – 1761 | |
| Alonso de Cárdenas | 1761 – 1762 | acting |
| Melchor Feliú | 1762 – 1763 | oversaw migration of many Floridanos to Cuba |

== British period, 1763–1784 ==
=== East Florida ===
| Name | Term | Notes |
|---|---|---|
| John Hedges | 20 Jul 1763 – 30 Jul 1763 | capital at St. Augustine (acting governor) |
| Francis Ogilvie | 30 Jul 1763 – 29 Aug 1764 | acting governor |
| James Grant | 29 Aug 1764 – 9 May 1771 | |
| John Moultrie | 9 May 1771 – 1 Mar 1774 | |
| Patrick Tonyn | 1 Mar 1774 – 12 Jul 1784 | |

=== West Florida ===
| Name | Term | Notes |
|---|---|---|
| Lieutenant Colonel Augustine Prevost | 6 Aug 1763 – 20 Oct 1763 | Interim military government. Capital at Pensacola |
| Major Robert Farmar | 20 Oct 1763 – Oct 1764 | Acting |
| Post-captain George Johnstone | Oct 1764 – Jan 1767 | |
| Montfort Browne | Jan 1767 – 2 April 1769 2 May 1769 - c.Nov 1769 | Acting governor. |
| Captain John Eliot | 2 Apr 1769 – 2 May 1769 | Committed suicide in office by hanging. |
| Captain-Lieutenant Elias Durnford | c. Nov 1769 – 10 Aug 1770 | |
| Peter Chester | 10 Aug 1770 – 9 May 1781 | |

== Second Spanish period, 1784–1821 ==

=== East Florida ===
| Name | Term | Notes |
|---|---|---|
| Vicente Manuel de Céspedes y Velasco | 12 July 1784 – July 1790 | capital at St. Augustine. Francisco Cruzat served as interim governor in 1789. |
| Juan Nepomuceno de Quesada y Barnuevo | July 1790 – March 1796 | |
| Bartolomé Morales | March 1796 – June 1796 | acting governor |
| Enrique White | June 1796 – March 1811 | |
| Juan José de Estrada | March 1811 – June 1812 | Patriot War with U.S. |
| Sebastián Kindelán y Oregón | June 1812 – June 1815 | Patriot War with U.S. |
| Juan José de Estrada | June 1815 – January 1816 | |
| José María Coppinger | January 1816 – 10 July 1821 | |

=== West Florida ===
| Name | Term | Notes |
|---|---|---|
| Colonel Arturo O'Neill de Tyrone | 9 May 1781 – Nov 1792, or in 1794 | capital at Pensacola |
| Carlos Howard | Nov 1792 – Aug 1793 | |
| Enrique White | Aug 1793, or Aug 1794 – Nov 1795 | |
| Francisco de Paula Gelabert | May 1796 – Sep 1796 | |
| Colonel Vicente Folch y Juan | Nov 1796 – Mar 1809 | |
| Francisco San Maxent | Mar 1809 – May 1809 | interim; see Apr. 1811 |
| Colonel Vicente Folch y Juan | May 1809 - Oct 1809 | |
| Francisco San Maxent | Dec 1809 - Oct 1810 | interim |
| Francisco Collell | Oct 1810 – Feb 1811 | interim |
| Francisco San Maxent | Apr 1811 – Jun 1812 | |
| Mauricio de Zúñiga | Jul 1812 – Apr 1813 | |
| Mateo González Manrique | May 1813 – Feb 1815 | |
| José de Soto | Feb 1815 – Mar 1816 | |
| Mauricio de Zúñiga | Mar 1816 – 15 Sep 1816 | |
| Francisco San Maxent | Sep 1816 – Nov 1816 | |
| José Fascot | 27 Nov 1816 – 26 May 1818 | |
| Colonel William King | 26 May 1818 – 4 Feb 1819 | United States military governor during the First Seminole War |
| Colonel José María Callava | Feb 1819 – 17 July 1821 | |

== See also ==
- List of governors of Florida, for a list of United States territorial and state governors of Florida since 1821.
