= Governor Márquez =

Governor Márquez may refer to:

- Francisco Menéndez Márquez (died 1649), Governor of Spanish Florida from 1646 to 1648
- Juan Menéndez Márquez (died 1627), Interim Governor of Spanish Florida from 1595 to 1597, and Governor of Popayán Province from 1620 to 1627
- Pedro Menéndez Márquez (died 1600), 3rd Governor of Spanish Florida from 1577 to 1594
- Miguel Márquez Márquez (born 1968), governor of the Mexican state of Guanajuato from 2012 to 2018

== See also ==
- Silvino Silvério Marques (1918–2013), Portuguese Colonial Governor of Cape Verde from 1958 to 1962 and Governor of Angola from 1962 to 1966 and in 1974
