= Pastrana =

Pastrana may refer to:

- Pastrana (musical) is a 1989 Australian musical by Allan McFadden and Peter Northwood.
- Pastrana (surname)
- Pastrana, Spain, a medieval town and municipality in the province of Guadalajara, Castile-La Mancha
- Pastrana, Leyte, a municipality in the Philippines
