= Nicolás Suárez Ponce de León =

Acting Governor of La Florida
- In office September 21, 1631 – July 29, 1633
- Preceded by: Andrés Rodríguez de Villegas
- Succeeded by: Luis de Horruytiner
- In office May 14, 1651 – October 19, 1651
- Preceded by: Benito Ruíz de Salazar Vallecilla
- Succeeded by: Pedro Horruytiner Benedit

Personal details
- Born: 1595 Almaguer, Cauca, in modern Colombia
- Died: 1651 St. Augustine, Florida

Nicolás Suárez Ponce de León (c. 1590 – 1651) was the accountant (contador) for the Royal Treasury of Spanish Florida from 1630 until his death in 1651, and from 1631 to 1633 served as acting co-governor of the colony with Eugenio de Espinosa, when Governor Andrés Rodríguez de Villegas died in office, and also for a few months in 1651.

== Biography ==
Nicolás Suárez Ponce was born between 1590 and 1595, in Almaguer, Cauca, in what is now Colombia, then part of the Spanish colony of the New Kingdom of Granada. He was the son of Alejo Suarez de Pereda and Juana Ponce de León. His father was a captain and Justicia Mayor (Chief Justice) of the Viceroyalty of Peru, while his paternal grandfather was Captain Alonso Suárez de Pereda, and his maternal grandfather, Fernando Ponce de León, was one of the first Spanish conquistadors of Peru. Nicolás Ponce was apparently a cousin to, but definitely not a direct descendant of Juan Ponce de León, the explorer and governor of Puerto Rico and Florida.

In 1622, Ponce began his military service with the Spanish Army in various actions against indigenous peoples in the province of Santa Marta, when it was administratively part of the New Kingdom of Granada. Ponce married in 1631, and moved in 1633 with his family from Seville to St. Augustine, the capital of the province of La Florida, to serve as contador (accountant) for the Royal Treasury of the province.

On September 21, 1631, Ponce and Sergeant Major Eugenio de Espinosa were appointed interim co-governors of La Florida to replace the incumbent governor, Andrés Rodríguez de Villegas, who had died in office. (Note: On the death or absence of a governor, the treasury officials often jointly governed Florida until a new governor appointed by the king could take up his duties.) Ponce and Espinosa were dismissed from the co-governorship when Villegas died on July 29, 1633, and was replaced by Luis de Horruytiner.

In 1637, Ponce, acting in his capacity as royal accountant, had the treasurer Francisco Menéndez Márquez imprisoned on charges of spending funds intended for the situado (an annual subsidy from the Crown) on gambling and other pleasures in Mexico City.

On May 14, 1651, after the death of governor Benito Ruíz de Salazar Vallecilla, Nicolas Ponce de León was again appointed interim governor of Florida, serving until he himself died on October 19, 1651. He was buried in the cemetery of St. Augustine.

His son Nicolás Ponce de León II also served as acting governor of Florida in 1663–1664 and 1673–1675.

== Personal life ==
Nicolás Ponce de León married Estefania Mendoza de Avila in Seville Cathedral between 1625 and 1629, and they had three children: Isabel, in 1630, Estefania, between the end of that year and early 1631, and Manuel Ponce de León y de Avila Mendoza in 1637. His wife was a native of Madrid.
