= Vallecilla =

Vallecilla is a surname. Notable people with the surname include:

- Benito Ruíz de Salazar Vallecilla (died 1651), Spanish colonial governor
- Gustavo Vallecilla (born 1999), Ecuadorian footballer
- Nancy Vallecilla (born 1957), Ecuadorian hurdler and heptathlete
