= Andrés Rodríguez de Villegas =

Spanish royal governor

2nd Governor of the Province of Margarita
- In office 6 June 1619 – 1 June 1626
- Preceded by: Francisco Gutiérrez Flores
- Succeeded by: Garcia Álvarez de Figueroa

Governor of La Florida
- In office June 23, 1630 – July 1631
- Preceded by: Luis de Rojas y Borja
- Succeeded by: Nicolás Ponce de León

Personal details
- Born: 1580 San Juan (Puerto Rico)
- Died: July 1631 (died in office) Saint Augustine, Florida

Andrés Rodríguez de Villegas (1580 – July 1631) was a Spanish soldier who served as governor and captain-general of the Province of Isla Margarita, Venezuela (1619–1626) and as governor of Spanish Florida (1630–1631).

== Biography ==
=== Early years ===
de Villegas was born in 1580, in San Juan, Puerto Rico; he was the son of Antonio Rodríguez de Villegas, a hidalgo, oidor and licentiate (holder of an advanced university degree).

In 1604, Villegas joined the infantry of the Spanish Army, where he spent 15 years. He then joined the royal Spanish Navy, sailed to the Moluccas, the Philippines and other islands, and was appointed a captain (Capitán de navío), rising to the rank of "Admiral" (Almirante) of the South Sea (Pacific Ocean).

In 1607, Rodríguez's oldest brother, Antonio Rodríguez de Villegas, was appointed commissioner by the Viceroy of New Spain, the Marquess of Montesclaros (Marquesado de Montesclaros), Juan de Mendoza y Luna, to ascertain the cause of the death of the captain general of the Philippines, Pedro Bravo de Acuña, in exchange for the office of interim governor.

=== Political career ===
==== Governor of the province of Margarita ====
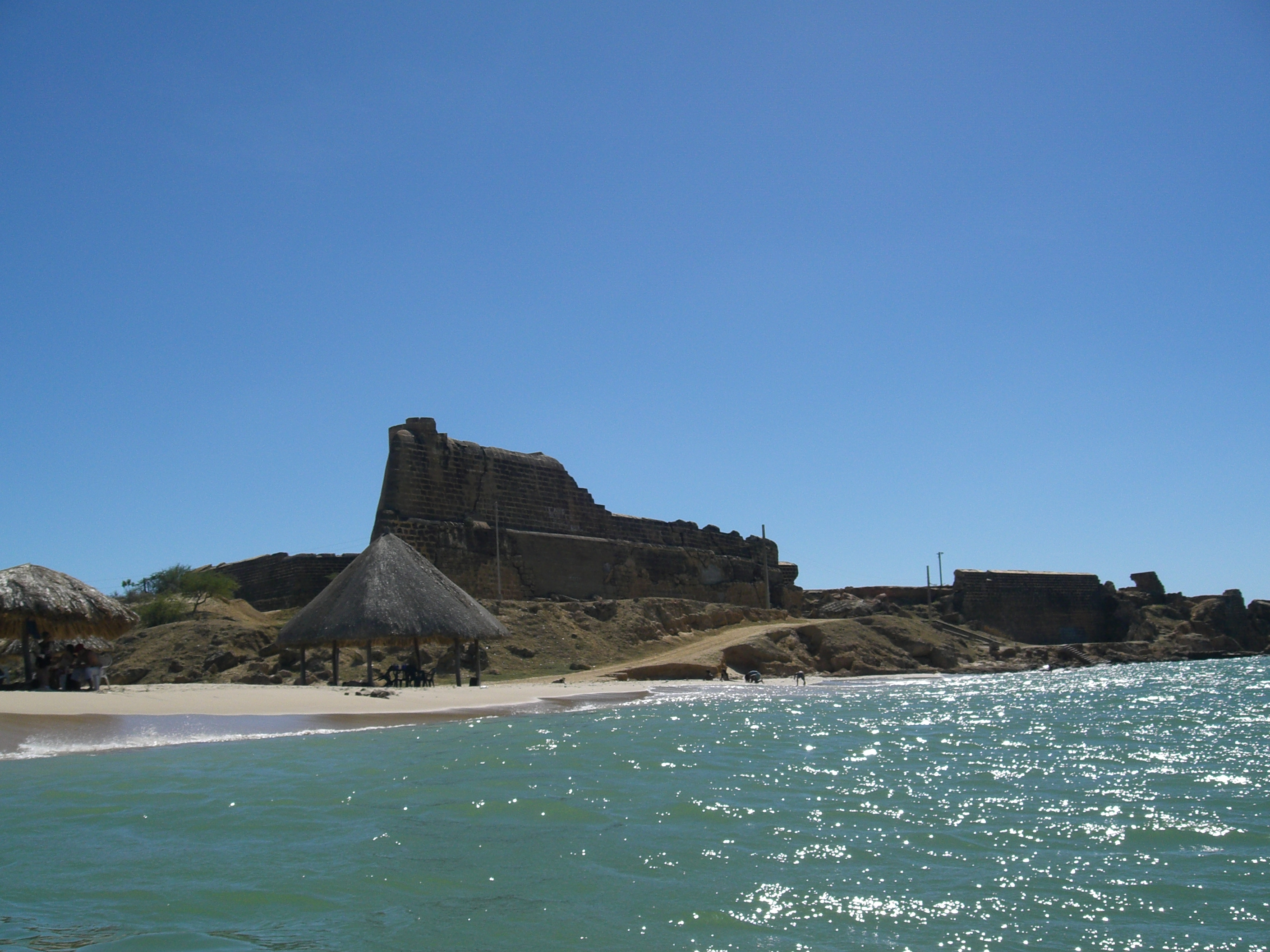
Fortress of Araya

Villegas was appointed governor of Isla de Margarita, Venezuela, and arrived there on June 6, 1619. Taking office on August 1, he wrote immediately to King Philip III to inform him of the neglected defenses of Araya and the pressing need to improve them, as Dutch interlopers were extracting large amounts of salt from the nearby salt pans.

The Dutch attacked the Araya Peninsula twice in 1620, but were repulsed by Spanish forces, as had happened previously in November 1605. On January 15, 1622, a number of Dutch boats came to Araya to load cargoes of salt, followed by a fleet of 27 Dutch ships which set about building two forts and saltworks, an event which coincided with a decree by Madrid to construct fortifications to defend the salt pans. On 22 February, Villegas decided to immediately leave Pampatar with reinforcements of 20 soldiers and 12 Waikerí bowmen under his command to engage the Dutch troops at Santiago. The soldiers refused to join him, however, when he launched his attack, and seeing the main Dutch party land to the eastward, he abandoned the attempt; his troops were able, however, to prevent the Dutch from landing at the harbor of Pueblo de la Mar, with several Dutch soldiers being killed. By a royal decree of March 13, 1622, construction of the fortress at Araya was to proceed.

On 30 November 1622, a fleet of 43 Dutch ships attacked Araya to halt construction of the Spanish fortress and seize the peninsula. After two months of fighting, the invasion fleet was expelled by Spanish forces on January 13, 1623.

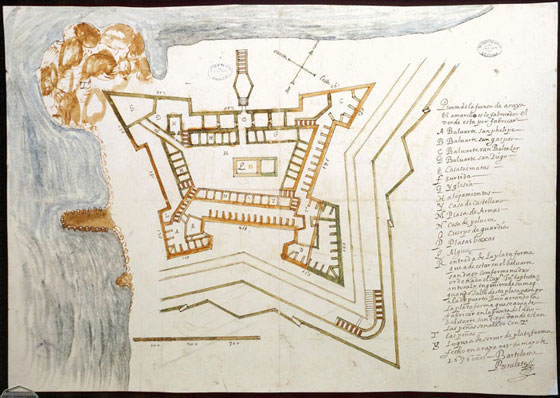
Plan of the castle of Araya, c. 1636

On April 24, 1623, Villegas met with the governor of New Andalusia, Diego de Arroyo, and military engineers Juan Bautista Antonelli and Cristobal Roda Antonelli, to determine the criteria of plans for the proposed fortress. Governor Rodríguez presented his own plan to the Crown, but the one submitted by Roda prevailed. On May 15, Rodríguez sent a letter with the plan for the project. By January 1625, he had built the first bastion of the Real Fortaleza de Santiago de Arroyo de Araya (Royal Fortress of Santiago of Arroyo of Araya), but on February 6 he wrote the king that the structure had collapsed because its foundations were too close to the beach, exposing them to undermining by ocean waves.

Villegas relinquished command of Margarita Island to Garcia Álvarez de Figueroa, on June 1, 1625. According to the Royal Court, he was a just governor and zealous in administrative affairs.

==== Governor of La Florida and last years ====
On June 23, 1630, Andrés Rodríguez de Villegas was appointed governor of La Florida, a position he held until September 21, 1631 (however, Amy Bushnell says his term ended in July 1631) when he died in office. He was replaced by co-interim governors Nicolas Ponce de Leon, the provincial royal accountant (contador), and Sergeant Major Eugenio Espinosa. They governed provisionally until they were replaced by Luis de Horruytiner, who governed from July 29, 1633 to 1638.

Andrés Rodríguez de Villegas died in office as governor of La Florida on September 29, 1631 in St. Augustine, capital of Spanish Florida, of unknown causes.
