= Tomás Menéndez Márquez =

Spanish colonial administrator (1643–1706)

- Born: Tomás Menéndez Márquez y Pedroso; 1643; St. Augustine, Florida
- Died: 1706 (aged 62–63); Mexico City (in modern Mexico), New Spain
- Occupation: Official

Tomás Menéndez Márquez y Pedroso (1643–1706) was an official in the government of Spanish Florida, and owner, with his brothers, of the largest ranch in Spanish Florida. He was captured by pirates in 1682 and held for ransom, but was rescued by the Timucua.

== Early life ==
Tomás Menéndez Márquez was born in St. Augustine, Florida in 1643. His father was Francisco Menéndez Márquez y Posada, royal treasurer (tesorero real) and co-interim governor of Spanish Florida. Tomás's mother was Antonia Ana Pedroso y Ayllón, from Cuba. Tomás's grandfather was Juan Menéndez Márquez, royal treasurer and co-interim governor of Spanish Florida, governor of Popayán Province (in what is now Colombia), and nephew of Pedro Menéndez Márquez, who had been governor of Spanish Florida for 17 years, who was in turn the Nephew of Pedro Menéndez de Avilés the Founder of St. Augustine and Spanish Florida.

Tomás Menéndez Márquez was the sixth child of Francisco and Antonia. His mother died before he was five years old, and his father died in 1649, when Tomás was six years old. The Menéndez Márquez family was well-to-do. They owned eleven slaves, and Francisco had established an estancia (cattle ranch) in Potano Province, which would become the largest ranch in Spanish Florida. Tomás's father and grandfather had held the position of royal treasurer of Spanish Florida for a combined total of 56 years. A few years after Francisco's death the accounts of the treasury were audited, and it was found that Francisco had borrowed between 16,000 and 20,000 pesos from the treasury. An attempt was made to recover the missing funds by selling the ranch, but no buyers could be found, and the ranch remained with the Menéndez Márquez family.

The Menéndez Márquez ranch of la Chua was attacked during the Timucua Rebellion of 1656. Juan Menéndez Márquez y Pedroso, Tomás's oldest brother, was managing the ranch at the time. (Note: Jerald Milanich states that Tomás was the brother involved in this incident, but other sources say it was Juan, and Tomás would have been only 13 years old at the time.) One of the leaders of the rebellion was Lúcas Menéndez, chief of San Martín de Timucua and paramount chief of the Timucua Province, and probable godson of Francisco Menéndez Márquez y Posada. Lúcas sent a letter to Juan in St. Augustine, warning him to not visit the ranch. Juan could not read the Timucua language, however, and went to the ranch unaware of the danger. Lúcas Menéndez ordered his people to kill all Spaniards, except for missionaries. Couriers carrying this order found two workers from the Menéndez Márquez ranch, a Spaniard and a Tabasco Mexican, on the road and killed them. Lúcas Menéndez led a raiding party to the Menéndez Márquez hacienda. At the hacienda the Timucuas killed a Spanish soldier who had traveled with Juan Menéndez Márquez from St. Augustine and two African slaves that belonged to the ranch. The Timucuas also killed all the cattle they could find, and burned the hacienda. Lúcas protected Juan, apparently because Juan's father Francisco had been generous to him, and sent Juan to St. Augustine with an escort.

== Ranching ==
In the early 1660s Tomás Menéndez Márquez was commissioned as an Adjutant in the garrison at St. Augustine. Tomás married María Ruíz Mejía de los Angeles in 1663. The next year his brother Juan purchased the office of royal accountant (contador real) for Spanish Florida (Note: Provinces in the Spanish Empire had a royal treasury controlled by a set of officiales reales (royal officials). The officials of the royal treasury included up to four positions: a tesorero (treasurer), the senior official who guarded money on hand and made payments; a contador (accountant or comptroller), who recorded income and payments, maintained records, and interpreted royal instructions; a factor, who guarded weapons and supplies belonging to the king, and disposed of tribute collected in the province; and a veedor (overseer), who was responsible for contacts with native inhabitants of the province, and collected the king's share of any war booty. The factor and veedor were combined as a factor/veedor from the establishment of Spanish Florida in 1565. In 1628 the position of factor/veedor was eliminated in Florida, and the treasurer became known as a treasurer-steward. The treasury officials were appointed by the king, and were largely independent of the authority of the governor. On the death, unauthorized absence, retirement or removal of a governor, the treasury officials would jointly govern the province until a new governor appointed by the king could take up his duties. Treasury officials were supposed to be paid out of the income from the province, but Spanish Florida had almost no income, and the salaries of the treasury officials were paid out of the situado, a royal subsidy. Treasury officials were normally prohibited from engaging in income-producing activities, but those restrictions were partially lifted and largely ignored in Florida.) and Tomás resigned his commission and assumed management of the family ranches. Construction of the Castillo de San Marcos in St. Augustine began in 1672, creating an increased demand for food for the workers. The Menéndez Márquez ranches sent cattle to St. Augustine. Hides and tallow from the cattle were exported to Havana. Cattle were sometimes driven to Apalachee Province, as well. A port called San Martin was established in the early 1670s on the Suwannee River, and Tomás shipped hides, dried meat and tallow to Havana from that port. Tomás owned a ship which was engaged in the trade between San Martin and Havana. This ship also carried rum and Spanish and Mexican goods from Havana, maize and beans from Apalachee Province, and deerskins and furs obtained from Apalachicola Province.

Cattle ranching boomed in Spanish Florida in the latter part of the 17th century. Tomás Menéndez Márquez and his son Francisco founded or bought most of the ranches located between the St. Johns River and the Potano missions (in what is now western Alachua County). The best known of the ranches was la Chua, on the north side of what is now known as Paynes Prairie. (Note: A Spanish map from 1764 shows eight ranches of 25 square leagues each west of the St. Johns River. Five of those ranches, including la Chua, were claimed by the Menéndez Márquez family. By then, however, all of the ranches had been outside of Spanish control for 60 years. Another ranch owned by Tomás, called Utina Paja or Utinapalga, was located about five leagues south of Mission San Francisco de Potano.) He also formed alliances with other cattle ranchers. In 1681, Juan de Hita Salazar, who had resigned a commission as Captain in the army to start a ranch in Potano Province, married Tomás and María's daughter Antonia. In 1682 Tomás and María's daughter María Isadora married Francisco Romo de Uriza, who had a cattle ranch located across Paynes Prairie from la Chua. Tomás and María's son Francisco married Antonia Basilia de León in 1689. Antonia's mother was a widow, and owned ranches close to St. Augustine. The prosperity of the ranches attracted unwanted attention. French pirates based on Anclote Key raided up the Suwannee River in 1682. They reached the la Chua hacienda at 2:00 AM and captured Tomás, his son-in-law Juan de Hita, and four servants. The pirates demanded 150 head of cattle and money for a ransom, and began withdrawing to Anclote Key. Three Timucua chiefs ambushed the pirates and freed Tomás and Juan de Hita before any ransom was paid. In 1684 pirates again attacked la Chua, by way of the Amajuro River (probably the Withlacoochee River), but Tomás had retired to St. Augustine to take up the position of royal accountant, leaving management of the ranches to his son-in-law, Juan de Hita.

Ranches and farms in Spanish Florida were taxed at two-and-one-half percent of their produce, which for a ranch meant that two-and-one-half percent of the calves born each year were sent to St. Augustine. In 1699 the Menéndez Márquez ranches paid a tax of 77 calves, implying that about 3,080 calves had been born on the ranches that year. This number was 35% of all calves paid in tax that year. However, ranching became less profitable with time. A beef steer was worth 21 pesos in 1651, but only six pesos in 1689. The value of a horse fell from 100 pesos in 1651 to 25 pesos in 1682. A pair of draft oxen was worth 80 pesos in 1651, but only 25 pesos in 1682. Starting in the 1680s the English of the Province of Carolina and their native allies began raiding in Florida. Run-away slaves and non-mission Indians stole cattle for food. By the first years of the 18th century, raids by pirates, rustlers, and the English had severely affected ranching in Spanish Florida. A blockhouse was constructed at la Chua and soldiers were stationed there to help work the ranch and protect it. The pressure of further raids forced the defenders to burn the blockhouse in 1706 and retreat to St. Augustine.

== Royal accountant ==
In 1684 Tomás succeeded his brother Antonio as royal accountant (Antonio had succeeded Juan when Juan was transferred to Havana in 1673). The governor, Juan Márquez Cabrera, disputed Tomás's right to fill the position because he was a criollo. The governor was overruled because Antonio had paid 1,000 pesos in 1673 for the right to succeed his brother Juan as royal accountant, and 500 pesos in 1682 to establish Tomás's right to succeed him. (Note: Important (and salaried) positions in the government of the Spanish Empire in the New World were usually reserved for peninsulares, men born in Spain. However, Florida was an impoverished frontier post, and positions other than governor were commonly held by criollos. Purchase of official positions was common, and remained legal until the 19th century.) Tomás entered the position, with back pay, in 1686.

One of the Florida treasury officials would travel to Mexico City each year to collect the situado, the royal funds allocated annually to support the presidio in St. Augustine. Tomás went to Mexico City in 1689 and stayed there for four years, perhaps because the Nine Years' War made travel hazardous. When he finally returned to St. Augustine, governor Diego de Quiroga y Losado arrested him for failing to return when ordered, and for failing to send the situado one year. Laureano de Torres y Ayala replaced Quiroga y Losado as governor later that year, and released Tomás. Tomás traveled to Mexico City to collect the situado again in 1702 and in 1706. Tomás died in Mexico City that year. Tomás's son Francisco Menéndez Márquez y Ruíz Mejía succeeded him and served as royal accountant of Florida for 34 years.
