= Ildefonso Islands =

Chilean group of islands

Native name: Islas Ildefonso
- Location within Southern Patagonia

Geography
- Coordinates: 55.83°S 69.37°W
- Adjacent to: Pacific Ocean
- Total islands: 9 islands and islets
- Area: 0.2 km^{2} (0.077 sq mi)

Administration
- Chile
- Region: Magallanes
- Province: Antartica Chilena
- Commune: Cabo de Hornos

Additional information
- NGA UFI=-884851

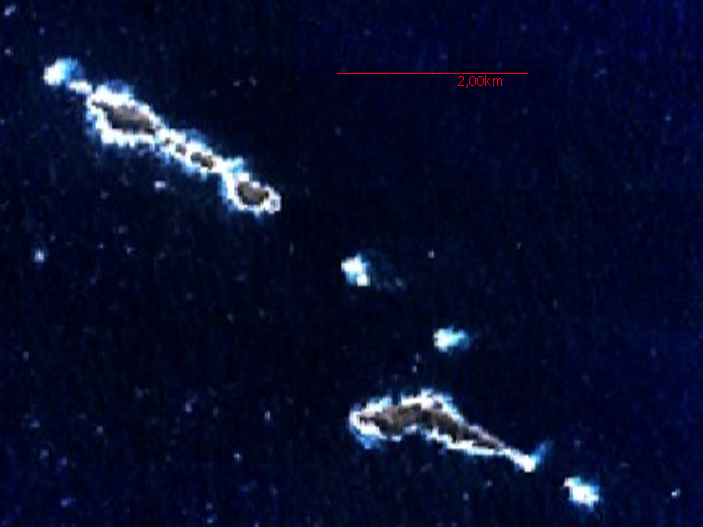
NASA World Wind screenshot of Ildefonso Islands, Chile

Islas Ildefonso are a group of islands in Chile. The islands belong to the Commune of Cabo de Hornos in Antártica Chilena Province of Magallanes and Antártica Chilena Region. They lie 96 km (60 mi) west of Isla Hermite, part of Tierra del Fuego, and 93 km (58 mi) NNW of Diego Ramirez Islands, but only 27 km (17 mi) south of Isla Hoste or 23 km (14 mi) to rocks near Isla Hoste.

== Description ==
The islands were named by the Spanish navigator Diego Ramírez de Arellano, who piloted the Garcia de Nodal expedition through the region in 1619. The islands consist of nine stacks, within two groups. They extend 6 km (4 mi) on a northwest–southeast axis. The land area measures about 200,000 m^{2} (2,152,782 sq ft). More than 50% of this comprises the large single southern stack, which is 970 m (3,182 ft) long and between 80 and 200 m (262 and 656 ft) wide. The islands are steep and rocky, and covered in tussac grass.

== Important Bird Area ==
The islands have been identified by BirdLife International as an Important Bird Area because they hold large breeding populations of both southern rockhopper penguins (86,000 breeding pairs) and black-browed albatrosses (47,000 breeding pairs). There are also smaller numbers of grey-headed albatrosses. Magellanic penguins, imperial shags and sooty shearwaters present.

== Islands ==
Area data are from the USGS unless otherwise specified.

Island	Area (ha)
Grande	40.8
Norte	16.1
Hind	7.0
Square	2.5
Spirit	1.0
Cinclodes	0.9

== See also ==
- List of islands of Chile
- List of Antarctic and sub-Antarctic islands
- List of Antarctic islands north of 60° S
