= Diego Ramírez de Arellano =

Spanish cosmographer and sailor

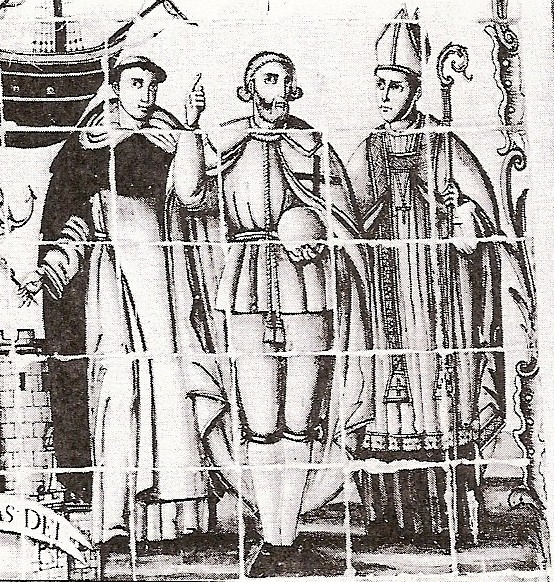
- Ramírez de Arellano (center) from an 18th-century ceramic altarpiece commemorating the sons of Xàtiva
- Born: c. 1580; Xàtiva, Crown of Aragon
- Died: 27 May 1624 (aged 43–44); Seville, Crown of Castile
- Occupation: Navigator
- Known for: Discovery of the Diego Ramírez Islands

Diego Ramírez de Arellano (c. 1580 – 27 May 1624) was a Spanish sailor and cosmographer. (Note: Cosmography was a discipline of Renaissance science that was particularly important in Spain, where scholars were trying to discover and organize knowledge about the "New World". A cosmographer's scope would include geography, cartography, ethnography, natural history and (to a lesser degree) astronomy. The early cosmographers tried to fit their findings into the classical and humanist framework, but soon abandoned the attempt and developed new approaches to understanding and organizing what they found.) He achieved fame for piloting the Garcia de Nodal expedition to the region of the Strait of Magellan. The expedition discovered the Diego Ramírez Islands, the most southerly point visited by Europeans until the discovery of the South Sandwich Islands by Captain James Cook in 1775.

== Background ==
The Strait of Magellan was discovered by the Spanish in 1520, providing a sea route between the Atlantic and the Pacific that ran between South America and the archipelago of Tierra del Fuego. The strait averages just over 4 miles (6.4 km) wide, and is much narrower in places, forming a "V" shape pointing south. There are westerly or southwesterly winds most of the year, often stormy. The tidal currents are strong and unpredictable. The strait is a difficult and dangerous passage for a sailing vessel. Early in the seventeenth century it became known that the Dutch navigators Jacob Le Maire and Willem Schouten had found a new and safer route farther south. Philip III of Spain arranged for an expedition of two ships to verify the discovery, which left Lisbon in September 1618.

== Garcia de Nodal expedition ==
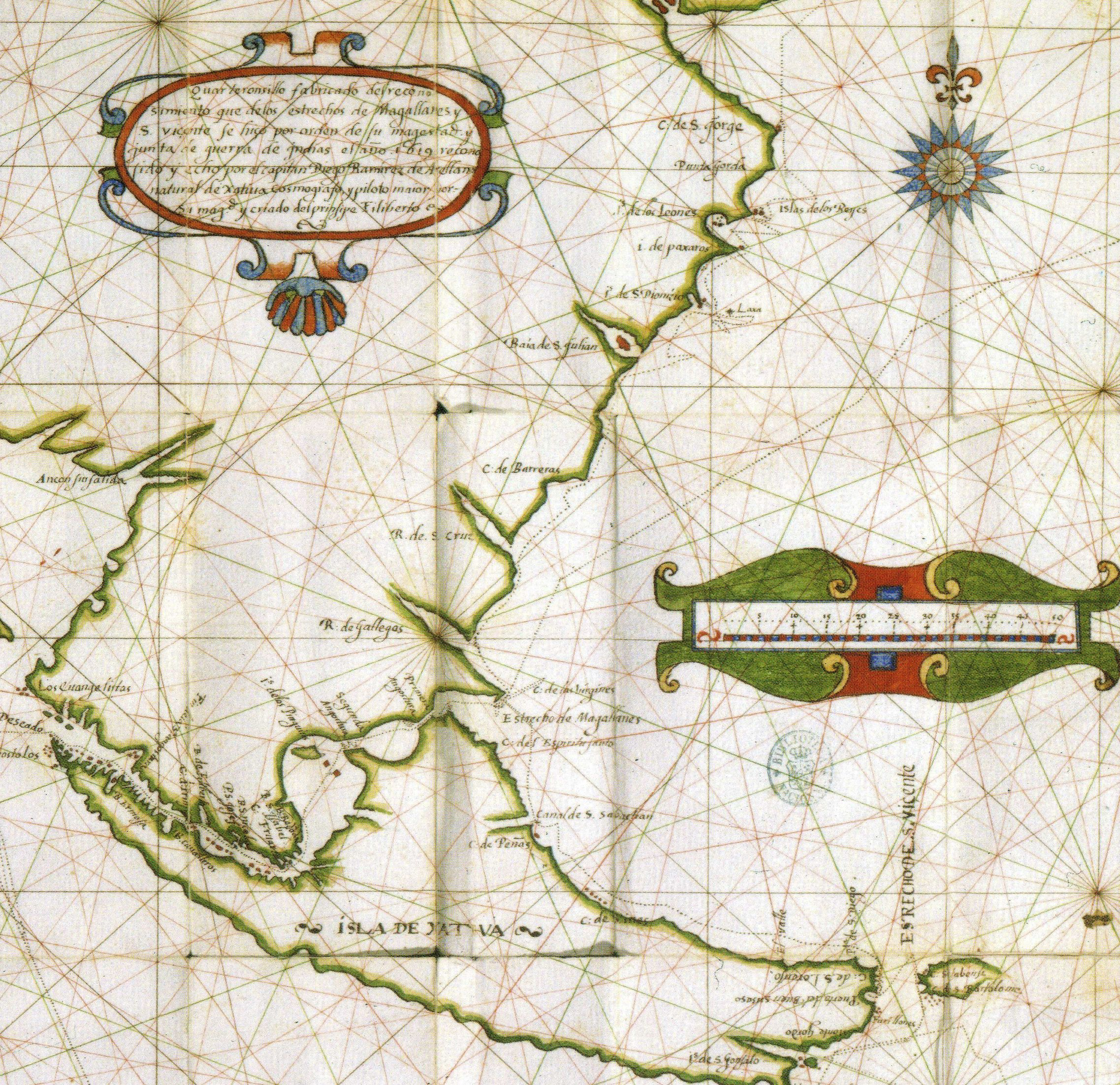
Part of the map by Diego Ramírez de Arellano showing the "Isla de Xativa", today called Tierra del Fuego

Location of the Diego Ramírez Islands to the south of Tierra del Fuego

Diego Ramírez de Arellano was born in Xàtiva in Valencia around 1580. He was appointed the main pilot in the 1618 expedition led by the brothers Bartolomé and Gonzalo García del Nodal to explore the Straits of Magellan. The expedition consisted of two caravels. Ramírez was charged with astronomical observations and with preparing charts with the help of Juan Manso and seven other pilots, four in each caravel. They had modern astrolabes that could measure angles of five minutes of arc, giving much more accuracy than older instruments.

The expedition left Lisbon on 27 September 1618 and returned to Sanlúcar de Barrameda nine months later on 8 July 1619. The two caravels navigated without difficulty to the southern extreme of the American continent, resting on the way for a few days at Rio de Janeiro. They left Rio de Janeiro on 6 December 1618. On 6 January 1619 they found islands that they named Los Reyes. On 19 January they reached the Cape of Virgins, and on 22 January Cape Le Maire, which they called Cape San Vicente. The ships sailed through the San Vicente Strait, then west into the Pacific. This verified the route found by the Dutch. On 10 February 1619 they found a small group of islands to the southwest that they named after their cosmographer: the Diego Ramírez Islands.

Sailing northwest, the expedition then entered the western end of the Magellan Strait and returned eastward to the Atlantic via the strait. The journey met no difficulties other than those normal in the harsh environment of the region. Ramírez, assisted by the pilot Juan Manso, collected the material needed to draw the first comprehensive sea chart of the southern part of Patagonia. The circumnavigation showed that Tierra del Fuego was an island, not a northern extension of the "Terra Australis" southern continent as had been thought.

== Later career ==
From as long ago as 1613 the Spanish had been planning to send a fleet to assist the garrison in the Philippines. In 1616 it was proposed to send eight ships with 150 bronze artillery pieces and 1,600 infantry. In 1617 the former Procurator General had written to the king asking that the fleet be dispatched as soon as practical, and that year a small fleet was sent via the Cape of Good Hope, which reached the Philippines two years later, in 1619. On 2 July 1619 a new fleet was ordered to take the Cape of Good Hope route to the Philippines, but for the rest of the year there was discussion about whether this route or the route round South America would be best.

Lorenzo de Zuazola was appointed commander of the fleet. On 10 December 1619 Zuazola was ordered to sail via the Cape of Good Hope, but on 12 December was authorized to change to the newly discovered Cape Horn route if the experts in the fleet agreed that weather and the fleet's position were favorable. Francisco Montez was made pilot of the fleet. Diego Ramírez de Arellano was made honorary captain of the Spanish infantry, and was given the title of almirante. Ramírez also served as a pilot, and was recommended to the Governor of the Philippines as a cosmographer and expert in navigation. From the Philippines, Ramírez was to go on to the spice islands, where the Dutch were in strength, and then to try to discover Australia.

The departure was confused, with some ships setting off early and then returning to Cadiz. The whole fleet left on 21 December 1619, and ran into a violent storm on 3 January 1620. The ships were scattered, with some coming ashore on the coast of Spain, others on the coast of Africa. Many were killed, including Zuazola. Only two tenders escaped from the Santa Margarita galleon, saving Diego Ramírez de Arellano and Admiral Garcia Álvarez de Figueroa. Ramírez de Arallano swam ashore.

Ramírez was appointed pilot major of the House of Trade in Seville, an important position which he held from 1620 to 1624. While still in office, Ramírez died in Seville on 27 May 1624. He left all his property and debt to his wife Marian Aybar, who was six months pregnant.

== Achievements ==
Ramírez de Arellano made important contributions to navigation, pinning down latitudes and longitudes and correcting navigation charts. Ramírez named many places including the Isla de Xátiva, now the Isla Grande de Tierra del Fuego, the Ildefonso Islands and the Strait of Saint Vincent the Martyr, named after the patron saint of Valencia. This last is now known as Le Maire Strait after the earlier Dutch navigator. Captain James Burney called the discovery of the Diego Ramírez Islands the most remarkable event of the voyage, since for a century and a half they were the most southerly points marked on any chart.

Ramírez published a chart of magnetic variations that he had measured on the journey, the first for that region. The Nodal brothers' account of the voyage, Relación del viaje que por orden de su Majestad y acuerdos del Real Consejo de Indias, was published in Madrid in 1621 by Fernando Correa of Montenegro. Ramírez's 1621 narrative, Reconosimiento de los Estrechos de Magallanes y de San Viçente, was suppressed at the time. In 1866 a summary was published in the annual report of the Spanish Hydrographical Repository. The full text was not published until 2011.

== Bibliography ==
- Ramírez de Arellano, Diego (2011). Reconosimiento de los Estrechos de Magallanes y de San Viçente. Con algunas cosas curiossas de navegación. Por el cappitán Diego Ramírez de Arellano, cosmógrafo, y piloto maior del Rey, nro. Sr., en la contratación de Sevilla. La Institución Alfons el Magnànim. p. 657. ISBN 978-84-7822-587-3.
