= Alonso de Pastrana =

Alonso de Pastrana (? – ?) was a cacique who served as lieutenant governor of Spanish Florida for two one-year terms. The first commenced on November 8, 1622, under Juan de Salinas, and the second on August 17, 1627, under Luis de Rojas y Borja. In 1657, Pastrana was cacique in Arapaja and Santa Fe.
