= Damián de Vega Castro y Pardo =

Governor of La Florida
- In office November 26, 1638 – April 10, 1645
- Preceded by: Luis de Horruytiner
- Succeeded by: Benito Ruíz de Salazar Vallecilla

Damián de Vega Castro y Pardo was the governor of the Spanish province of La Florida from November 26, 1638 to April 10, 1645.

== Government in Florida ==
Castro was appointed governor of La Florida (Spanish Florida) on November 26, 1638. During the early months of his administration, he negotiated a peace between the Chacato, the people of Apalachicola Province, the Amacano and the Apalachee.

That same year, Castro proposed that the Chiscas, considered by the Spanish to be a violent people, be settled in agricultural communities near St. Augustine where, as part of the reducción program, Castro intended to employ them in the recovering of fugitive Christianized Indians, although it is not known if the plan was put into effect. On July 9, 1643, Castro wrote King Philip IV that two friars serving in the province had converted 1000 Indians. By the late 1640s, after Castro's term had ended, the Chisca were scattered throughout the upper St. Johns River region among the Timucuans of the Ibiniuti district. It was suggested that Castro should have settled the Chisca along the river to address the problem of their leaving the Mission San Diego. The presence of the Chisca in Florida sparked an Appalachee rebellion in 1647 and, subsequently several raids were made against the Timucua.

Castro had to deal with the fact that the Spanish situado (government subsidy of money) had not reached Florida since 1636, a problem that was exacerbated by the unintentional cancellation in 1643 of the arrival of food in San Agustín (Saint Augustine), the capital of the province. This forced Castro to send another letter to the king on August 29, 1644, explaining that the city's population would starve unless aid was sent soon. Castro's term as governor of La Florida ended on April 10, 1645, when he was replaced by Benito Ruíz de Salazar Vallecilla.
