= Pedro de Ibarra =

Spanish general

8th Governor of La Florida
- In office 20 October 1603 – 1610
- Preceded by: Gonzalo Méndez de Canço
- Succeeded by: Juan Fernández de Olivera

Personal details
- Born: unknown Basque Country
- Died: unknown
- Spouse: Ana de Unzueta
- Profession: Soldier and Administrator (Governor of Florida)

Pedro de Ibarra was a Spanish general who served as a Royal Governor of Spanish Florida (1603 – 1610).

== Early years ==
Originally from the Basque Country, Ibarra joined the Spanish Army in his youth and eventually attained the rank of general. In 1549 or 1553 (sources differ), following the orders of Capt. Alonso de Mercadillo, he explored southern Zamora in Amazonian Ecuador, part of the Viceroyalty of Peru, and gave the Nambíja (or Lambija) region its name.

== Governor of La Florida ==
On 28 August 1603, English pirates seized two Spanish ships from Seville near Cayo Romano, (Cuba), on board one of which was newly appointed governor of La Florida, Pedro de Ibarra, who escaped that night on one of the damaged vessels and arrived in Havana after a perilous voyage of 32 days at sea.

Ibarra then assumed office as governor of La Florida at St. Augustine on 20 October 1603. Ibarra, a career soldier with wide military experience, regarded maintaining the presidio's garrison and a vigilant watch for hostile intruders as his most important administrative duties.

Upon his arrival in Florida, Ibarra was determined to improve relations with the aggrieved Guale Indians of the Atlantic coastal region north of St. Augustine. A few years previously they had rebelled against Spanish rule under Ibarra's predecessor, Gonzalo Méndez de Canço, killing five Franciscan friars and destroying their missions in the uprising of 1597–1598 (also known as Juanillo's Revolt), with many Spanish soldiers also killed fighting to suppress the rebellion. Within two months of Ibarra's arrival, some forty leaders of the Guale had visited him in the Spanish capital to "render their obedience" to the new governor and to receive the presents that confirmed their subordinate relationship with him as representative of the Spanish king. In November and December 1604, Ibarra made a visita (official visit) to the Guale towns on the coast of present-day Georgia, where he listened to the native chiefs' complaints and settled disputes among them, as well as exhorting them to practice the Catholicism they had been taught by the missionaries. He was also visited by the mico of La Tama during his visita and determined them a good prospect for future conquests.

=== Ais-Spanish alliance ===
In his official relations with the Indian inhabitants of La Florida, Ibarra employed the diplomacy of gift-giving expected by native chiefs, and even resorted to kidnapping Ais leaders to parley with them.

The Ais were allowing English and French boats to land on their shores, which was considered a territorial violation by Spanish officials in St. Augustine, who believed these actions increased the chances of an enemy attack on the city from the south. Consequently, Ibarra sent an emissary to the Ais to make a treaty with their head chief, called "El Capitán Grande" by the Spanish. El Capitán Grande suggested that as a gesture of goodwill, the Spaniards and the Ais could exchange young boys who would then learn the other people's language. One of the Indians told the son of the Ais leader, however, that horses in St. Augustine ate people, scaring the boy so much that he fled St. Augustine. The Ais chief apologized, promising to send his son back to the Spanish town, then requested more gifts from the Spanish as a proof of their continued friendship.

Ibarra had tried for several years to get the chiefs of the Indian tribes south of St. Augustine to come to the provincial capital for peace talks, and finally, on September 2, 1605, El Capitán Grande arrived in St. Augustine, accompanied by the chiefs of Surruque and Urubia, and 20 other Indians of high status. Ibarra cordially welcomed and entertained them in his own home. The friendship of the Indians had been won. In the words of Ibarra, "Since then the Caciques come and go as they please, and our soldiers do the same, by sea as well as by land, with the greatest security."

In 1605, Ibarra sent a soldier-cartographer, Alvaro Mexia, on a diplomatic mission to the Ais, whose territory stretched from Cape Canaveral to the St. Lucie River. The mission was successful; the Ais agreed to protect the Spanish as far southward as their territory extended, and even to care for shipwrecked sailors in return for a ransom. The resulting peace allowed Mexia to complete a map of the Indian River area with the help of the Ais.

=== Capt. Écija's expedition to Virginia ===
On 8 November 1608, Ibarra received orders via a royal cédula from Philip III to send a reconnaissance expedition to find Jamestown, Virginia; Ibarra did so, assigning the expedition's command to Capt. Francisco Fernández de Écija. The governor instructed Écija that if he found the Jamestown settlement abandoned, he should sail further north to investigate the location of the copper mines (which the Spanish believed to be a gold mine) mentioned by Champlain in his description of a visit to the present-day Minas Basin in 1603.

=== Franciscan convent and Hospital of Santa Barbara ===
In 1605, after the Franciscan convent in St. Augustine had been rebuilt, and the repairs and enlargement of the Hermita de Nuestra Señora de la Soledad (Church of Our Lady of Solitude) were complete, Ibarra moved the Hospital of Santa Barbara (founded in January 1600 by the previous governor, Gonzalo Méndez de Canço), and its patients back to its original location in the convent. The Hospital de Santa Barbara was the first hospital in what is now the continental United States.

=== Term of office as governor ends ===
Ibarra governed La Florida until 1610, when he was succeeded by Juan Fernández de Olivera.

== Personal life ==
Upon Pedro de Ibarra's marriage to Ana de Unzueta, he was proclaimed Lord of the house of Unzueta in Eibar, province of Gipuzkoa, as can be read in an inscription encircled by a laurel wreath on his sepulchral monument at the Colegiata de Cenarruza (Collegiate Church of Cenarruza) or Ziortza (Basque), in Biscay. Dating from the 13th century, this was formerly the parish of the Oñacino faction of Oñaz de Gipuzkoa.
