= Juan Fernández de Olivera =

9th Governor of Spanish Florida
- In office 1610 – 23 Nov 1612
- Preceded by: Pedro de Ibarra
- Succeeded by: Juan de Arrazola and Joseph de Olivera

Personal details
- Born: c. 1560 Unknown
- Died: November 23, 1612 Saint Augustine, Florida
- Profession: Soldier and administrator

Juan Fernández de Olivera (c. 1560 – November 23, 1612) was the governor of Spanish Florida from 1610 to November 23, 1612. He died in office.

== Biography ==
Juan Fernández joined the Spanish army as a youth, and attained the rank of Captain. Fernández was appointed governor of Spanish Florida in 1610, replacing Pedro de Ibarra. He found the provincial capital, Saint Augustine, full of exiles – insubordinate military officers and licentious friars – as well many garrison soldiers who were debtors or had been convicted of petty crimes, including thievery, vagrancy, or rioting.

In 1611, Fernández sent infantry Captain Alonso Díaz, a native of Badajoz, Spain, to Tampa Bay to retaliate against the unconverted Indians of Pohoy for killing seventeen Christian Indians who were carrying supplies on the "River of Cofa" (the lower Suwannee River) to a missionary friar. Following their orders, the soldiers killed every native they captured.

Governor Fernández wrote King Philip III the same year, informing him that the foundation of growth for the province was gift-giving to the Indians and military support for the Franciscan missionaries who ministered to them. His presents to the natives that year included various kinds of cloth, blankets, hatchets, knives, strings of blue and purple glass beads, and cured tobacco, as well as clothing and comestibles.

In the summer of 1612, Governor Fernandez dispatched soldiers from St. Augustine to warn the chiefs of Pohoy and Tocobaga not to harm the Christian Indian settlements in revenge for the punishment inflicted on their predecessors. The Spanish brought the customary presents the Indians expected of a diplomatic mission, offering them friendship and peace in the king's name, in exchange for a promise of the same on their part. Ensign Juan Rodríguez de Cartaya then reconnoitered the Gulf Coast, leading an expedition in a gunboat launch and several canoes to pacify the Indians of the region, including the powerful Calusa chief Carlos, to whom further gifts were given.

Native American leaders were motivated to seek Spanish goods and the spiritual protection of the Franciscans, not only to enhance their own status so that they could maintain power over their people, but also perhaps to rebuild their communities, depopulated by the spread of epidemics, in the new towns that formed around the missions. This would explain why in the early autumn of 1612, a group of Native American leaders journeyed over two hundred miles, or three weeks travel, from the Cape of Apalachee (now Cape Saint George), and some of them even 500 or 600 miles, or two and a half months' travel, eastward to St. Augustine, seeking an audience with Governor Fernández.

It is known that Juan Fernández de Olivera had at least one brother, Pedro de Olivera. Juan Fernández de Olivera died on 23 November 1612, while still in office as governor of La Florida; he was replaced by the Royal Officials Juan de Arrazola and Joseph de Olivera.
