= Juan Treviño de Guillamas =

Spanish colonial governor

Governor of Florida
- In office 1613 – August 2, 1618
- Preceded by: Juan de Arrazola and Joseph de Olivera
- Succeeded by: Juan de Salinas

Governor of Venezuela
- In office 1621–1623
- Preceded by: Francisco de la Hoz Berrío
- Succeeded by: Diego Gil de la Sierpe

Personal details
- Born: Ávila, Spain
- Died: c. 1636 Unknown
- Profession: Administrator (Governor of Florida and Venezuela)

Juan Treviño de Guillamas (1558 – d. before 1636) was a Spanish governor of Spanish Florida (1613–1618) and Venezuela (1621–1623).

== Biography ==
Juan Treviño de Guillamas was born in the city of Ávila, Spain, and was baptized on May 31, 1558, in the Parish of San Juan Bautista. The son of Juan de Treviño y Guillamás and María Mercadillo, Treviño was appointed Captain General and governor of the Spanish province of La Florida in 1613. He moved to the provincial capital of St. Augustine, but resigned from office five years later on August 2, 1618. Juan Treviño de Guillamas was also governor of Venezuela between 1621 and 1623, and of the Isla Margarita.

Treviño died before 1636.

== Personal life ==
Juan Treviño de Guillamas married Ana María Pacheco y Zabala on November 15, 1589, in Havana, Cuba, and they had six children: Francisco, María Mercadillo, Catalina, Ana, Juan, and Teresa de Treviño y Pacheco. Teresa married Gonzalo Chacón de Narváez.
