= Pastrana (surname) =

Pastrana (Pastrani, ref. Visigoth King Wamba c. 630-687), is a Sephardic surname of Greek origin (Pastra (πάστρα), meaning cleanliness) and is toponymic. It was taken from a place with this designation, in the province of Guadalajara in Spain (the Town of Pastrana was documented in manuscripts referring to the Visigoth town of Pastrani, mentioned by King Wamba (c. 672-680)) when he was drawing up boundaries for Christian dioceses. It is a surname used by many Sephardic Jews and converso families (Ref. 1533-1539 Inquisition Trial of Juan de Pastrana Diaz for practicing Judaism (Judaizante) and having a Jewish genealogy (“tiene geneologia de los Pastranas y son de decendientes de judios”), see Spain’s PARES National Archives).

== Notable people ==
Notable people with the surname include:

- Alan Pastrana (1944–2021), American football quarterback
- Alonso de Pastrana, a cacique who served as lieutenant governor of Spanish Florida in the 17th century
- Andrés Pastrana Arango (born 1954), ex-president of Colombia
- Demetrio Pastrana (born 1941), Filipino gymnast
- Francisco Pastrana (born 1979), Argentine international rugby union referee
- Joana Pastrana (born 1990), Spanish professional boxer
- Juan de Pastrana (Fl. 1450), author of the incipit Thesaurus Pauperum Siue Speculum Puerorum (Grãmatica Pastrane), the first published grammar book for the Portuguese language in Portugal (Lisbon 1497)
- Julia Pastrana (1834–1860), Mexican woman born with hypertrichosis who exhibited herself in 19th-century Europe
- Misael Pastrana Borrero (1923–1997), Conservative Party politician and President of Colombia
- Mauricio Pastrana (born 1973), Colombian professional boxer
- Mónica Pastrana (born 1989), Puerto Rican beauty pageant titleholder and television presenter
- Ophelia Pastrana (born 1982), Colombian-Mexican transgender physicist, economist, speaker, YouTuber, technologist and comedian
- Pedro de Pastrana (c. 1495 – 1563), Music composer for Pope Clement VII (1478 – 1534) and Charles I (1500 – 1558), King of Spain and Holy Roman Emperor
- Romeo Pastrana (born 1958), better known as Dagul, Filipino midget actor, comedian, and politician
- Sara Pastrana (born 1999), Honduran swimmer
- Sebastián de Pastrana (1633–1700), Roman Catholic prelate who was Bishop of Paraguay (1693–1700)
- Travis Pastrana (born 1983), American motorsports competitor and stunt performer
- Víctor Pastrana (born 1996), Spanish professional footballer
- Viviana Ortiz Pastrana (born 1986), Puerto Rican fashion model and beauty queen
- Wilma Pastrana (born 1970), 13th First Lady of Puerto Rico
