= Juan de Posada =

Spanish politician

Juan de Posada, was a governor of Florida and Santa Elena from 1588 to 1589.

== Biography ==
Juan de Posada was born in Llanes, in Asturias, and was the son of Pedro de Tarapiella and Teresa Díaz de Posada.

Juan de Posada began serving in the Spanish military in 1570, and by October 1, 1578 he was living in La Florida, where he was the tenedor de bastimentos (person in charge of the distribution of food). On August 19, 1588, Governor Menéndez Márquez named him captain of the fort of Santa Elena, and the same year he was appointed as the governor of Florida, an office he retained until 1589. De Posada was named treasurer of Saint Augustine on 17 April 1592, but drowned the same year while sailing to Florida.

== Personal life ==
Posada married Catalina Menéndez Márquez, a sister of Pedro Menéndez Márquez. One of their daughters, María Menéndez y Posada, married future governor of Florida Juan Menendez Marquez when she was only 12 years old. The marriage was arranged by the uncle of both, Pedro Menéndez Márquez. Maria Menéndez y Posada inherited the title of royal treasurer of Saint Augustine, which had originally been carried by his father.
