= Battle of Mata Redonda =

1636 Portuguese-Dutch battle in Brazil

- Part of the Dutch invasions of Brazil
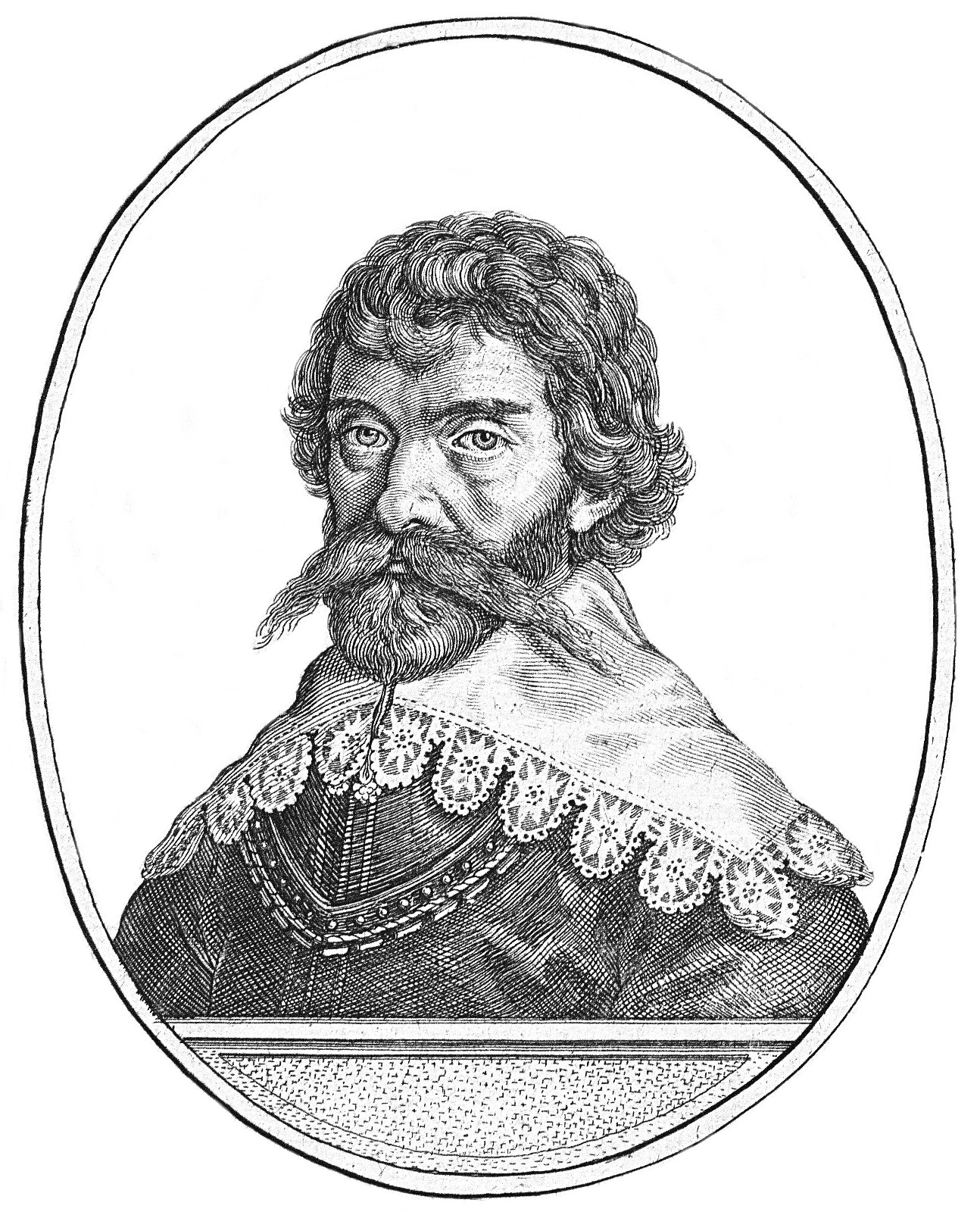
- Krzysztof Arciszewski, commander of the Dutch during the battle
Date	18 January 1636
Location	Brazil
Result	Dutch victory

Belligerents
West India Company	Kingdom of Portugal; Spain

Commanders and leaders
Krzysztof Arciszewski	Luis de Rojas y Borja †

Strength
1,500 soldiers	2,600 soldiers

Casualties and losses
light	2,100 killed, another great number wounded

When the Portuguese sent a large armada of thirty ships, and a large number of soldiers to put an end to Dutch Brazil in 1636. It was stopped, and soundly defeated by an outnumbered Dutch force.
