= Garcia Álvarez de Figueroa =

3rd Governor of the Province of Margarita
- In office 1626–1630
- Preceded by: Andrés Rodríguez de Villegas
- Succeeded by: Juan de Eulate

Garcia Álvarez de Figueroa was a Spanish soldier who was Governor of the Margarita Province, based on Margarita Island off the coast of what today is Venezuela, from 1626 to 1630.

== Early life ==
In December 1619, Álvarez de Figueroa was with a fleet of six galleons that set out from Cádiz with instructions to pass through the Strait of Magellan without stopping in Brazil. Under the command of Lorenzo de Zuazola, the fleet's ultimate destination was the Philippines. However, they never made it as the fleet ran into a violent storm and was forced to run back to land, with most of the ships run aground on Cape Trafalgar and many of the 1,700 men drowned. Only the galleon that held Admiral Garcia Alvarez de Figueroa and the cosmographer Diego Ramirez de Arellano stayed afloat.

== Governor of Margarita ==
Álvarez de Figueroa was appointed Admiral of the fleet of New Spain (Mexico) between 1622 and 1623.

Admiral Álvarez de Figueroa was appointed Governor and Captain General of the Island of Margarita on 30 April 1625. Margarita Province was a province of the Spanish Empire based on Margarita Island in what is now Venezuela.

He took over from Andrés Rodríguez de Villegas on 1 June 1626. He was accompanied by his son Gerónimo.

Governor Álvarez de Figueroa spent four years as Governor of Margarita Province was known for his interest in letters, for his contempt of the local Waikerí people, and for his enjoyment of the trade in pearls from Cubagua and the Macanao Peninsula.

He was succeeded by Juan de Eulate, a former Governor of New Mexico who was appointed Governor of Margarita Province on 10 April 1630.
