= Eugenio de Espinosa =

Spanish soldier

Eugenio de Espinosa was a Spanish soldier who served with Nicolás Ponce de León as interim co-governor of Spanish Florida from September 21, 1631 to July 29, 1633.

At a young age, Espinosa joined the Spanish army and soon attained the rank of sergeant major.

On September 21, 1631, he and the official Contador (accountant) of the province, Nicolás Ponce de León, were appointed as interim co-governors of La Florida to replace the incumbent governor, Andrés Rodríguez de Villegas, perhaps because of illness.

During his administration, Espinosa was subjected to a residencia (court of inquiry). He was accused of having spent 14,078 “reales” (1,280 ducats) more than the previous governor, Andrés Rodríguez de Villegas, from the so-called "Indian fund" appropriated as aid to the neighboring Indian provinces, assigned and administered by the Spanish government. The fund, disbursed as a portion of the situado, the annual royal subsidy, was intended to buy trade goods to be distributed as gifts among the various chiefs of the regional tribes, and thus secure their loyalty and encourage them in submission to the Crown and the Catholic Church.

Governor Rodríguez de Villegas died in 1633 and was replaced by Luis de Horruytiner; consequently, the interim co-governorship of Espinosa and Nicolás Ponce de León came to an end.
