= Luis de Rojas y Borja =

14th Governor of La Florida
- In office October 28, 1624 – June 23, 1630
- Preceded by: Juan de Salinas
- Succeeded by: Andrés Rodríguez de Villegas

Personal details
- Born: Unknown Valencia
- Died: January 18, 1636 Porto Calvo, Alagoas, Brazil

Military service
- Battles/wars: Dutch invasions of Brazil; Battle of Mata Redonda †

Luis de Rojas y Borja (died January 18, 1636) was the governor of Spanish Florida from October 28, 1624, to June 23, 1630. Afterwards, he went to Brazil to fight against the Dutch, where he was killed in the Battle of Mata Redonda.

== Life ==
Luis de Rojas y Borja was born in Valencia, Spain, and was the son of Pedro de Rojas y Ladrón, born in Valencia and Francisca de Borja y Morello, born in Gandia. His great-grandfather was Juan de Rojas y Rojas, I Marquis of Poza. He became a knight of the Order of Santiago in 1605.

== Career ==
During his administration, Governor Rojas y Borja dispatched an "entrada" of 10 soldiers and 60 Guale Native Americans in search of a group of "blond men on horseback" (probably groups of English settlers from the area that later became the Province of Carolina) who were exploring inland La Florida, territory claimed by the Spanish. This excursion followed two previous entradas dispatched in 1623 by his predecessor, Juan de Salinas, and led by a Timucuan chief for the same purpose. It is not known if they ever found the exploration party.

In the 1620s, there was war between the unchristianized Pohoy and Amacano Indian peoples. The Pohoy lived on the shores of Tampa Bay, and the Amacano probably occupied a territory southeast of Apalachee. Their warfare may have caused the Spanish to abandon the Cofa mission situated at the mouth of the Suwannee River, which was deserted sometime between 1616 and 1636. In 1628 or early 1629, Rojas ordered a detachment of soldiers to fetch the subchief of the Pohoy, second in rank to the cacique, so that he "might give him gifts and negotiate a peace" between the two combatants. Rojas y Borgas probably founded the mission of San Diego de Helaca around 1627, at the crossing on the east bank of the St. Johns river west of St. Augustine, to facilitate canoe traffic to the western provinces. Between 1624 and 1627, the place was devastated and then later repopulated by natives of Utiaca, in the Acuera province.

In 1627, Rojas y Borja sent two expeditions led by Pedro de Torres to reconnoiter Apalachee and the interior northward. The first consisted of twenty soldiers and sixty allied Indians who explored the Apalache region; in the second, Torres traveled to the northern interior of La Florida as far as Cofitachqui, first visited by the Hernando de Soto expedition in 1539.

In 1630, Inquisitor Agustin Ugarte y Saravia in Cartagena sent several blank commissions to Rojas y Borja for a commissioner and familiar, but apparently the governor never filled them.

Rojas y Borja was replaced by Andrés Rodríguez de Villegas as governor of Florida on 23 June 1630.
