= Francisco Menéndez Márquez =

Spanish colonial governor (d. 1649)

Governor of La Florida
- In office 11 April 1646 – 8 January 1648
- Preceded by: Benito Ruíz de Salazar Vallecilla
- Succeeded by: Benito Ruíz de Salazar Vallecilla

Personal details
- Born: 1601 St. Augustine, Florida
- Died: 1649 (aged 47–48) St. Augustine, Florida
- Profession: Royal treasurer and Administrator (Governor of Florida)

Francisco Menéndez Márquez y Posada (1601-1649) was a royal treasurer (tesorero real) and interim co-governor of Spanish Florida, and the founder of a cattle ranching enterprise that became the largest in Florida.

== Treasurer and acting governor ==
Francisco Menéndez Márquez was baptized in St. Augustine, Florida on April 2, 1601. His father was Juan Menéndez Márquez, also royal treasurer (Note: Provinces in the Spanish Empire had a royal treasury controlled by a set of officiales reales (royal officials). The officials of the royal treasury included up to four positions: a tesorero (treasurer), who guarded money on hand and made payments; a contador (accountant or comptroller), who recorded income and payments, maintained records, and interpreted royal instructions; a factor, who guarded weapons and supplies belonging to the king, and disposed of tribute collected in the province; and a veedor (overseer), who was responsible for contacts with native inhabitants of the province, and collected the king's share of any war booty. The factor and veedor were combined as a factor/veedor from the establishment of Spanish Florida in 1565. In 1628 the position of factor/veedor was eliminated in Florida, and the position's duties given to the treasurer, renamed treasurer-steward. The treasury officials were appointed by the king, and were largely independent of the authority of the governor. Treasury officials were supposed to be paid out of the income from the province, but Spanish Florida had almost no income, and the salaries of the treasury officials were paid out of the situado, a royal subsidy. Treasury officials were normally prohibited from engaging in income-producing activities, but those restrictions were partially lifted and largely ignored in Florida.(Bushnell 1981: 1–2, 129; Chipman; Parry: 202–203)) and interim co-governor of Spanish Florida. Francisco's mother was María Menéndez y Posada. (Note: Juan Menéndez Márquez was the nephew or cousin (or, by some accounts, the illegitimate son) of Pedro Menéndez Márquez, royal governor of Spanish Florida from 1577 to 1594. Pedro arranged for Juan to marry Pedro's niece, María Menéndez y Posada. María and Juan were betrothed in 1593, when she was only 12 years old, and married three years later, in 1596. (Pedro Menéndez Márquez was the nephew of Pedro Menéndez de Avilés, adelantado of Spanish Florida and the founder of St. Augustine.)(Bushnell 1978: 412)(Bushnell 1981: 18)) Juan, after serving as royal treasurer in Spanish Florida for 22 years, was appointed governor of Popayán Province (in present-day Colombia) in 1620. Francisco had become his father's assistant and acting treasurer when Juan went to Spain on a leave of absence in 1619, and Francisco continued to perform the duties of treasurer in his father's absence. Juan died in 1627, and Francisco was confirmed as his replacement as treasurer-steward the following year. Francisco went to Mexico City three times to collect the annual situado (the royal subsidy for the presidio of St. Augustine): in 1627, while still acting treasurer, and in 1631 and 1632. Francisco was suspended from his office in 1637, and reinstated in 1639. To deal with the duties added to his position in 1628, Francisco appointed his uncle Alonso Menéndez y Posada as steward in 1630. Alonso served as steward until Francisco's suspension in 1637, again from 1639 until 1646, when he was briefly replaced, and finally from 1647 until 1649.

When governor Benito Ruíz de Salazar Vallecilla was suspended from office in 1646, Francisco Menéndez Márquez and acting accountant Pedro Benedit Horruytiner acted as co-governors until Salazar Vallecilla was returned to office in 1648. (Note: On the death or absence of a governor, the treasury officials often jointly governed Florida until a new governor appointed by the king could take up his duties. Francisco thus served as interim co-governor with Horruytiner after the suspension of Salazar Vallecilla in 1646-1648,(Bushnell 1978: 418) and his father, Juan, did so (with factor/overseer Alonso de las Alas and accountant Bartolomé de Argüelles) in 1595-1597. Other joint interim governor-ships occurred in 1612-1613 and 1631-1633.(Worth, John E. "The Governors of Colonial Spanish Florida, 1565-1763". University of West Florida. Archived from the original on 17 October 2013.)) After being suspended, Salazar Vallecilla retreated to his farm near San Miguel de Asile.

A few years after Francisco's death, the royal treasury in St. Augustine was audited, and it was found that between 16,000 and 20,000 pesos were missing (Francisco's salary as treasurer was 1,470 pesos a year).

== Native relations and rebellions ==
Francisco Menéndez Márquez was unusual among Spanish officials in the degree to which he pursued close relations with the native peoples of Florida, including compadrazgo. He may have served as godfather to several native chiefs. The baptized name of the chief of Santa Catalina de Guale was Don Alonso Menéndez, and that of the chief of San Martín de Timucua, and paramount chief of the Timucuas, was Lúcas Menéndez. Francisco's relationship with Lúcas may have been instrumental in the support of the Timucua for the Spanish during the Apalachee rebellion. Lúcas spared the life of Francisco's son Juan in the Timucua rebellion of 1656, even though Lúcas had ordered that all Spaniards be killed.

By the mid-1640s, the treasury of New Spain had fallen seriously behind in payments of the situado that supported Spanish Florida. As a result, gifts to native chiefs and payments to natives drafted to work in St. Augustine had dried up, but the labor drafts continued. In 1645 many of the Guale, to avoid the labor drafts, left their mission towns "to retire among the heathen." Francisco Menéndez Márquez went to Guale Province, forced the natives to return to their towns, and took the leaders of the "rebellion" back to St. Augustine.

While Francisco Menéndez Márquez was acting as co-governor in 1647, non-Christian Apalachees revolted against Spanish authority, killing lieutenant-governor Claudio Luis de Florencia and his family, and three missionaries. Another five missionaries and the Spanish at former governor Salazar Vallecilla's farm near Asile were able to escape. Salazar Vallecilla led a combined force of 31 Spanish soldiers and 500 Timucuas in battle against a reported 5,000 to 8,000 Apalachees and allies in western Timucua Province. Both sides withdrew after the battle. Francisco was in Guale Province at the outbreak of the rebellion. Returning to St. Augustine, he led 21 Spanish soldiers and 60 Timucuas to Apalachee Province and negotiated an end to the revolt. Francisco then executed twelve of the Apalachee ringleaders, and sentenced 26 others to work on construction of the fort in St. Augustine.

== Ranching ==
By the 1640s Potano Province had become largely depopulated and subsumed into Timucua Province. Francisco Menéndez Márquez started cattle ranching in the abandoned Potano lands, with the approval of Timucua chief Lúcas Menéndez, probably in 1646 or 1647, while acting as co-governor. By 1649 the ranch was worth 8,000 pesos and earning 700 pesos a year. Bushnell calculates that 6,000 pesos would have purchased about 200 head of cattle, five horses, and two slaves to serve as ranch hands. This sum accounts for much of the 16,000 to 20,000 pesos that Francisco had "borrowed" from the royal treasury. The royal auditor tried to recover the funds by auctioning off the ranch, but there were no buyers, and the ranch remained in the hands of the Menéndez Márquez family.

== Family ==
Francisco Menéndez Márquez married Antonia Ana Pedroso y Ayllón, from Cuba. They had six children, the youngest of which Tomás Menéndez Márquez, was born in 1643. Antonia died soon after that, and by 1648 Francisco was married to Juana de Uriza, and they had a daughter. All three of Francisco and Antonia's sons served as officials of the royal treasury in St. Augustine. Juan served as accountant (contador) from 1661 until he was transferred to Havana in 1671. Antonio purchased the right to succeed Juan as accountant for 1000 pesos in 1673, and served until his death in 1684. Antonio had paid 500 pesos in 1682 to establish Tomás's right to succeed him, and Tomás served from 1684 until his own death in 1706.

Francisco Menéndez Márquez died in 1649, in the first year of an epidemic of yellow fever or typhus that eventually killed many of the Spanish in St. Augustine (and large numbers of native peoples in the missions).
