= Luis de Horruytiner =

Spanish colonial administrator

Royal Governor of La Florida
- In office July 29, 1633 – November 26, 1638
- Preceded by: Nicolás Ponce de León and Eugenio de Espinosa
- Succeeded by: Damián de Vega Castro y Pardo

Personal details
- Born: Zaragoza, Spain
- Died: Unknown
- Profession: Rancher and administrator (Governor of La Florida and Viceroy of Sardinia)

Luis Benedit y Horruytiner (? – ?) was a Spanish colonial administrator who held office as governor of Spanish Florida (July 29, 1633 – November 26, 1638), and viceroy of Sardinia. He was the uncle of Pedro Benedit Horruytiner, who succeeded him as governor of La Florida.

== Biography ==
Luis de Horruytiner was born in Zaragoza, Spain, to Mosén Gilbert Benedit de Huessa and María de Horruytiner. He had a brother, Mosén Gilbert Benedit y Horruytiner. His family was prominent in Saint Augustine, the capital of La Florida, and operated several cattle ranches on their land along the Rio San Juan (St. Johns River).

In 1630, Horruytiner was appointed alcaide, or commander, of the Castillo del Morro in Havana, Cuba. On July 29, 1633, Horruytiner began his term as governor of the province of La Florida.

In autumn of 1633, Hurruytiner and Friar Lorenzo Martinez agreed to send to Florida two Franciscan friars who knew the Indian language and would work to convert the indigenous population of Apalachee to Catholicism. The Franciscans may have converted around 6,000 people. Governor Damián de Vega Castro y Pardo (1639–1645) wrote to King Philip IV in 1639 that two friars had converted 1,000 Indians in Apalachee province, but in 1635, the Franciscan Custodio of Florida had claimed that about 5,000 of the more than 34,000 Indians in Apalachee had been baptized. In 1676, however, a Franciscan claimed to have found a listing (matrícula) made in 1638 of 16,000 Christianized Indians living in Apalachee. The Spanish government probably counted only the men among the natives, with a ratio of Christians compared to the total population of the province of 1 in 5 people. The evidence indicates that the Franciscans inflated the numbers of Christianized Indians. According to historian Paul E. Hoffman, if in 1647 the population remained at 34,000 people and the caciques had the same number of subjects in Apalachee, the Christian population there would have been 6,800 people in that year. In 1635 there were over 30,000 converts among the 44 doctrinas, administered by 39 friars.

The native village that preceded the mission settlement of San Luis as capital of the Apalachee was called Anhaica Apalache, a name mentioned in the chronicles of the Hernando de Soto expedition. Mission San Luis was likely named in honor of Luis Horruytiner. Hurruytiner sent ships from St. Augustine to find a port on the Gulf coast of Florida to replace the long and difficult land route supplying the mission; the expedition found a suitable port at the mouth of the St. Marks River.

Hurruytiner dispatched sergeant major Antonio de Herrera López y Mesa to the western mission provinces to negotiate a peace with the leaders of the warring parties: the unchristianized Chacato who lived to the west of Apalachee, the towns of Apalachicola Province to the northwest, and the Amacano to the southeast. López summoned the leaders of each of the warring parties and brokered a treaty between all the combatants.

Luis de Horruytiner finished his term as governor of Florida on November 26, 1638, and was succeeded by Damián de Vega Castro y Pardo. After leaving his political position in Florida, Hurruytiner was appointed Viceroy of Sardinia, at the time a Spanish possession.
