= Bartolomé de Argüelles =

Co-interim Governor of La Florida (with Alonso de las Alas and Juan Menendez Marquez)
- In office 1594–1595
- Preceded by: Domingo Martínez de Avendaño
- Succeeded by: Gonzalo Méndez de Canço

Personal details
- Profession: Lieutenant treasurer, royal accountant and colonial governor

Bartolomé de Argüelles (? - ?) was the lieutenant treasurer, royal accountant and co-interim governor of La Florida (1595–1597) with Alonso de las Alas and Juan Menéndez Márquez. He served as lieutenant treasurer during the administration of governor Pedro Menéndez de Márquez (1577-1594).

== Career ==
In 1586, during the governorship of Pedro Menéndez Márquez, the English privateer Francis Drake attacked and burned St. Augustine (San Agustín), the capital of Florida (La Florida), destroying many documents including records of account, so that Argüelles had to make a new inventory of property that remained after the fire.

When Governor Domingo Martínez de Avendaño died in 1595, the three treasury officials, treasurer Juan Menéndez Márquez, accountant Bartolomé de Argüelles and factor-overseer Alonso de las Alas, became acting co-governors of La Florida. (Note: On the death, unauthorized absence, retirement or removal of a governor, the treasury officials often jointly governed Florida until a new governor appointed by the king could take up his duties. Such joint interim governorships occurred in 1595-1597, 1612-1613, 1631-1633, and 1646-1648.(Worth, John E. "The Governors of Colonial Spanish Florida, 1565-1763". University of West Florida. Archived from the original on 17 October 2013.)) At the time of Avendaño's death, Argüelles was in Mexico City to retrieve the situado, the annual subsidy from the treasury of New Spain to support the presidio at St. Augustine. Menéndez Márquez and Las Alas were reported to have quarrelled over the governance of Florida until Argüelles returned from Mexico City. Argüelles, who had been in Florida since the 1570s and had become accountant in 1591, aspired to be governor. (Note: Argüelles served as lieutenant of the Santa Elena garrison from 1583 to 1587. He returned to Spain in time to serve as a captain of infantry with the Spanish Armada. The ship he claimed to have served on, however, wrecked in Ireland with only one known survivor, who was executed by the English. Argüelles soon returned to Florida, and was appointed accountant.(Francis & Kole: 115))

Argüelles sent a petition to be appointed as governor to the King shortly after Avendaño's death. The King turned down Argüelles's request, and appointed Gonzalo Méndez de Cancio y Donlebún, who had never been to Florida, as governor. Méndez arrived at St. Augustine in 1597. Soon after Méndez reached St. Augustine, he encountered resistance over a payment from the royal treasury to the new garrison priest, Father Ricardo. Argüelles and factor-overseer Las Alas refused to make the payment, saying that there was no authorization for it. Menéndez Márquez sided with governor Méndez on the issue. Shortly afterwards, Méndez charged Las Alas with embezzling funds from the royal treasury, and suspended him from office. Las Alas claimed that Méndez and Menéndez Márquez had conspired against him. The king had given governor Méndez authorization to name his own lieutenant and successor, and Méndez chose his nephew, Juan García de Navia. Rather than attack governor Méndez directly, Argüelles conducted a letter-writing campaign against García and other officials appointed by Méndez, and against Méndez's handling of the Guale rebellion.

Alarmed at repeated incursions into the province of Guale by French sassafras traders, who were coming and going unmolested in the harbors of the coast, Argüelles implored Governor Menéndez Márquez to send Timucuan allies with Spanish troops to seize their canoes and burn their food crops, as well as to seize some of the young men and enslave them. Menéndez Márquez's successor, Méndez de Canço, employed these tactics, thus reviving Márquez's "war of fire and blood" against the rebel Guale.
