= San Miguel de Asile =

- U.S. National Register of Historic Places
- Location within Florida Location within the United States
- Location: Jefferson County, Florida
- Nearest city: Lamont
- Coordinates: 30.38°N 83.81°W
- NRHP reference No.: 74000644
- Added to NRHP: December 17, 1974

San Miguel de Asile was a Spanish Franciscan mission built in the early 17th century in the Florida Panhandle, near the present-day town of Lamont, Florida. It was part of Spain's effort to colonize the region, and convert the Timucua and Apalachee people to Christianity. The mission served a local chiefdom of the Timucua people known as the Yustaga. It lasted until the first decade of the 18th century, when it was destroyed, possibly by Creek Indians and the English.

The site where the mission stood was added to the U.S. National Register of Historic Places on December 17, 1974.

The archaeological site was first discovered and investigated by B. Calvin Jones between 1968 and 1972. Jones concluded that the site was that of San Miguel de Asile. More recent archaeological work and research by Alissa Slade casts doubt on Jones's theory. Slade's research indicates the site was not San Miguel de Asile, a Timucuan mission, but rather an Apalachee mission, possibly San Lorenzo de Ivitachuco.
