= Benito Ruíz de Salazar Vallecilla =

Governor of La Florida
- In office 10 April 1645 – 11 April 1646
- Preceded by: Damián de Vega Castro y Pardo
- Succeeded by: Francisco Menéndez Márquez
- In office 8 January 1648 – 14 May 1651
- Preceded by: Pedro Benedit Horruytiner
- Succeeded by: Nicolás Ponce de León

Personal details
- Born: unknown
- Died: 1651 St. Augustine, Florida

Benito Ruíz de Salazar Vallecilla (died 1651) was twice governor of Spanish Florida, from 1645 to 1646 and from 1648 to 1651.

== Career ==
Benito Ruíz de Salazar Vallecilla was appointed Royal Governor of La Florida on April 10, 1645. In that year he led an expedition to the north of Apalachee Province, along the lower Chattahoochee River into southwestern Georgia and eastern Alabama. Ruíz established a farm near the mission San Miguel de Asile that raised wheat, maize and hogs. He traded for deer skins with the people of Apalachicola Province, and raised mules and horses. In 1646 he was removed from office by the Royal Treasurer, Francisco Menéndez Márquez, and the Royal Accountant, Pedro Benedit Horruytiner, for failing to produce a galleon he had contracted to build for the King of Spain. Menéndez Márquez and Horruytiner served as co-interim governors for the next two years. Ruíz was re-appointed governor of Florida in 1648 and served until his death in 1651.

=== First term as governor of Florida ===
In 1646, Ruíz devised a plan to relocate the Indian converts who lived at the interior mission of Santiago de Oconi within the Okeefenokee Swamp (in what is now southeastern Georgia), to the lightly populated mission of San Diego de Helaca on the east bank of the St. Johns River, founded by the Spanish between 1624 and 1627. This town was regarded as the entryway to the Timucua and Apalachee provinces, and the Indians there were tasked with providing ferry service on the Camino Real (Royal Road). The resettlement effort was frustrated by the fact that San Diego remained almost entirely depopulated by 1648. Consequently, in April, Ruíz sent a soldier from the garrison in St. Augustine, Juan Dominguez, southward to find the town's people and their chief. Dominguez gathered all the Indians he could find and returned them to San Diego de Helaca. Ruíz ordered that no one should abandon the town without his permission. When he learned that Francisco, the chief of the people of Utiaco, who was supposed to remain at San Diego but had abandoned the place with his people, leaving it deserted, Ruiz sentenced him to death by garroting. The governor then dispatched Juan Dominguez again to Santa Lucia to find Francisco and execute him.

=== Second term as governor of Florida ===
Less than a year after the Apalachee Indian revolt of 1647, Ruíz was reinstated as governor of Florida on January 8, 1648. The Chisca, a nomadic people from the Appalachians, had begun entering the mission frontier early in the 17th century and were preying on Christian Indians resident in the missions of Timucua and Apalachee. Because of their repeated raids in 1651, Ruíz expelled all the Chiscas who had stayed in Florida.

Benito Ruíz de Salazar Vallecilla served until his death on May 14, 1651, during an epidemic. He was replaced by Nicolás Ponce de León.
