= Pedro Benedit Horruytiner =

Spanish soldier

Royal Governor of La Florida
- In office 11 April 1646 – 8 January 1648
- Preceded by: Benito Ruíz de Salazar Vallecilla
- Succeeded by: Benito Ruíz de Salazar Vallecilla
- In office 19 October 1651 – 18 June 1654
- Preceded by: Nicolás Ponce de León
- Succeeded by: Diego de Rebolledo

Personal details
- Born: 1613 Zaragoza, Spain
- Died: November 20, 1684 (aged 70–71) Florida
- Profession: Soldier and Administrator (Governor of Florida)

Pedro Benedit Horruytiner y Catalán (1613 – November 20, 1684) was a Spanish soldier who served as interim co-governor of Spanish Florida (La Florida) between 1646 and 1648, and as governor between 1651 and 1654. When governor Benito Ruíz de Salazar Vallecilla was suspended from office in 1646, acting royal contador (accountant or comptroller) Horruytiner and Francisco Menendez Marquez served as co-governors until Salazar Vallecilla was returned to office in 1648.

== Biography ==
Pedro Benedit Horruytiner was born in Zaragoza, Spain in 1613. He was the son of Gilberto Benedit Horruytiner and Inés Catalán, and the brother of Micaela Benedit Horruytiner Aragón. He was a nephew of the former governor of Florida, Luis Benedit Horruitiner. Pedro Horruytiner joined the Spanish Army as a youth on December 10, 1635. and gained the ranks of sergeant major ("sargento mayor") and lieutenant colonel, which he held when he was appointed interim governor of Florida. Horruytiner moved to Saint Augustine the capital of Spanish Florida, on 11 April 1646.

Pedro Benedit Horruytiner was appointed acting co-governor of Florida on 11 April 1646. On September 5, 1647, Horruytiner and Francisco Menendez Marquez issued an ultimatum to the Chisca Indians, who had attacked the Christianized Timucuan settlements, forcing them to choose within two months between their annihilation in Florida, or settlement in the towns of the Christian Timucua. Consequently, the Chisca chieftains agreed to settle their people in the Timucua mission settlements.

In January of the same year, Horruytiner ordered Ensign Pedro de Florencia to search for the Indians who had been living in the missions of San Francisco de Potano and Santa Fé de Teleco, fearing those places would be permanently depopulated. Although the expedition seems to have achieved its goal as the Spanish attempted to repopulate these settlements, their demographic decline continued.

Horruytiner's term as interim governor of Florida ended on 8 January 1648; he was reappointed as governor on 19 October 1651. He retired on 18 June 1654, and was replaced by Diego de Rebolledo. Horruytiner died at the age of 71 on November 20, 1684, still in the service of the Spanish Crown.

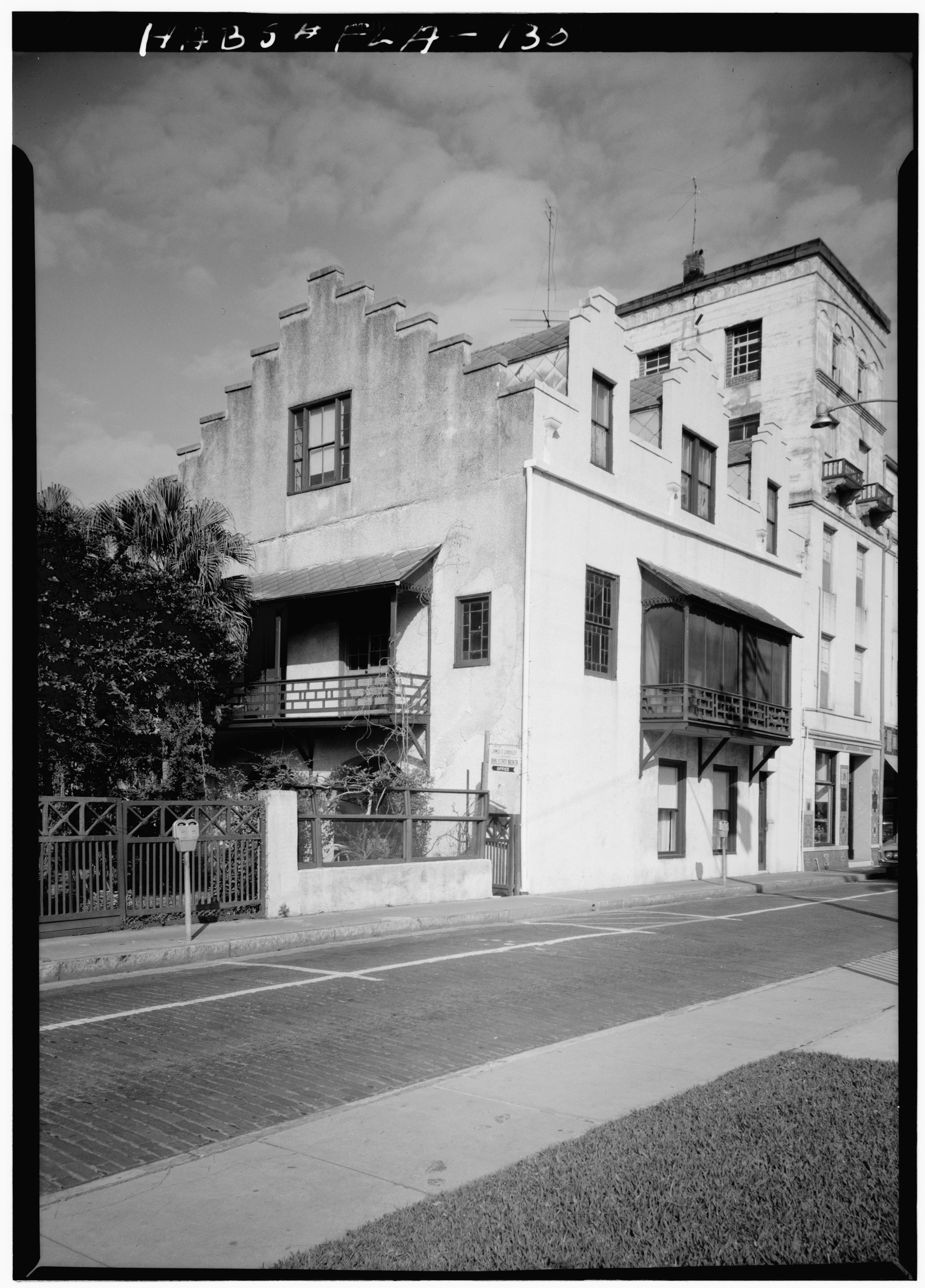
Don Pedro Horruytiner House, 214 Saint George Street, Saint Augustine.

== Personal life ==
Pedro Benedit Horruytiner married María Ruíz de Cañizares Mexía y Florencia in Saint Augustine, on February 19, 1637. They had several children, including Isabel, Manuela, Jacobina, Juan, Pedro, Josef, Lorenzo, and Juan Benedit de Horruytiner y Ruíz de Cañizares. Juan Horruytiner was a captain in the Spanish Army.

== Legacy ==
- The private library of Pedro Benedit Horruytiner in St. Augustine is one of the oldest preserved in Florida. The library's history was described by historians Luis R. Arana and Eugenia B. Arana in their work,. "A private library in St Augustine, 1680", which appeared in "El Escribano: The St. Augustine Journal of History" (8:4, 1971, pp. 158–171), published by the St. Augustine Historical Society.
- In the book Ghosts of St. Augustine by Dave Lapham and Tom Lapham, which collects popular stories about ghosts in St. Augustine, a story is told entitled The Gallant Governor about Governor Don Pedro Horruytiner. The story tells of alleged encounters with several ghostly figures, which have been linked both to Hurruitiner and to a cat supposedly killed there.
- A distant descendant of Horruytiner, José Antonio Primo de Rivera, son of the Spanish dictator Miguel Primo de Rivera, was the founder of the Falangist Spanish political party, which governed Spain between 1923 and 1930. He was killed on November 20 (the same date as Pedro Benedit Horruytiner's death), in 1936 during the Spanish Civil War.
