= Juan de Salinas =

Governor of Spanish Florida

Juan de Salinas was the governor of Spanish Florida from August 2, 1618 - October 28, 1624.

Salinas arrived at Saint Augustine in 1618 to replace Juan Treviño de Guillamas as governor of the Spanish territory of La Florida. Under his administration, living conditions for Christianized Native Americans living in the Spanish missions of the territory deteriorated. They retreated to the forests of Guale and San Pedro (now Cumberland, Georgia) to escape near slavery.

Salinas's unsympathetic policy in dealing with the Natives caused problems in Spanish relations with the tribes. According to a later report by a Spanish soldier, ensign Adrián de Cañizares y Osorio, Salinas dispatched him more than sixty leagues into the interior in Florida to punish the Chisca and Chichimeco peoples, "who were disturbing and robbing and killing the Christian Indians of the provinces of Timicua and Apalachee...".

In 1623, Salinas received reports of an expedition of "blond men on horseback" (probably groups of English settlers from the area that later became the Province of Carolina) exploring inland La Florida, territory claimed by the Spanish. Salinas sent two entradas (reconnaissance expeditions) of twenty soldiers and sixty Guale Native Americans led by a Timucuan chief, in search of them. His successor, Luis de Rojas y Borja, sent a third entrada of 10 soldiers and 60 Guale for the same purpose. It is not known if they ever found them.
