= Juan Menéndez Márquez =

Interim Governor of La Florida
- In office 1595–1597
- Preceded by: Domingo Martínez de Avendaño
- Succeeded by: Gonzalo Méndez de Cancio

Personal details
- Born: 1531 Cudillero, Asturias (Spain)
- Died: 1627 (aged 95–96) Known
- Profession: Royal treasurer, interim governor (of Spanish Florida), and governor (of Popayán Province, in present-day Colombia).

Juan Menéndez Márquez y Valdés (1531–1627) was royal treasurer and interim governor of Spanish Florida, and governor of Popayán Province (in present-day Colombia). He was the father of Francisco Menéndez Márquez, who succeeded him as governor of Florida (1646–1648).

== Biography ==
Juan Menéndez Márquez was the nephew or cousin (or, by some accounts, the illegitimate son) of Pedro Menéndez Márquez, royal governor of Spanish Florida from 1577 to 1594. Pedro arranged for Juan to marry Pedro's niece, María Menéndez y Posada. María and Juan were betrothed in 1593, when she was only 12 years old, and married three years later, in 1596. María's father Pedro de Posada, one of Pedro Menéndez de Avilés's associates and a colleague of Pedro Menéndez Márquez, who had been named tesorero real (royal treasurer) (Note: Provinces in the Spanish Empire had a royal treasury controlled by a set of officiales reales (royal officials). The officials of the royal treasury included up to four positions: a tesorero (treasurer), who guarded money on hand and made payments; a contador (accountant or comptroller), who recorded income and payments, maintained records, and interpreted royal instructions; a factor, who guarded weapons and supplies belonging to the king, and disposed of tribute collected in the province; and a veedor (overseer), who was responsible for contacts with native inhabitants of the province, and collected the king's share of any war booty. The factor and veedor were combined as a factor/veedor from the establishment of Spanish Florida in 1565. In 1628 the position of factor/veedor was eliminated in Florida, and the treasurer became known as a treasurer-steward. The treasury officials were appointed by the king, and were largely independent of the authority of the governor. Treasury officials were supposed to be paid out of the income from the province, but Spanish Florida had almost no income, and the salaries of the treasury officials were paid out of the situado, a royal subsidy. Treasury officials were normally prohibited from engaging in income-producing activities, but those restrictions were partially lifted and largely ignored in Florida.(Bushnell 1981: 1-2; Chipman; Parry: 202-203)) of Florida, died in 1592 before he could assume the duties of the position. Juan Menéndez Márquez, as the betrothed of Posada's daughter, inherited the position and served as royal treasurer from 1593 until his death in 1627.

Florida governor Domingo Martínez de Avendaño died in 1595, and the three treasury officials, treasurer Juan Menéndez Márquez, accountant Bartolomé de Argüelles and factor-overseer Alonso de las Alas, became acting co-governors of Florida. (Note: On the death, unauthorized absence, retirement or removal of a governor, the treasury officials often jointly governed Florida until a new governor appointed by the king could take up his duties. Such joint interim governorships occurred in 1595-1597, 1612-1613, 1631-1633, and 1646-1648.(Worth, John E. "The Governors of Colonial Spanish Florida, 1565-1763". University of West Florida. Archived from the original on 17 October 2013.)) At the time of Avendaño's death, Argüelles was in Mexico City to retrieve the situado, the annual subsidy from the treasury of New Spain to support the presidio at St. Augustine. Menéndez Márquez and Las Alas were reported to have quarrelled over the governance of Florida until Argüelles returned from Mexico City. Argüelles, who had been in Florida since the 1570s and had become accountant in 1591, aspired to be governor. (Note: Argüelles served as lieutenant of the Santa Elena garrison from 1583 to 1587. He returned to Spain in time to serve as a captain of infantry with the Spanish Armada. The ship he claimed to have served on, however, wrecked in Ireland with only one known survivor, who was executed by the English. Argüelles soon returned to Florida, and was appointed accountant.(Francis & Kole: 115)) Argüelles sent a petition to be appointed as governor to the King shortly after Avendaño's death. The King turned down Argüelles's request, and appointed Gonzalo Méndez de Cancio y Donlebún, who had never been to Florida, as governor. Méndez arrived at St. Augustine in 1597. Soon after Méndez reached St. Augustine, he encountered resistance over a payment from the royal treasury to the new garrison priest, Father Ricardo. Argüelles and factor-overseer Las Alas refused to make the payment, saying that there was no authorization for it. Menéndez Márquez sided with governor Méndez on the issue. Shortly afterwards, Méndez charged Las Alas with embezzling funds from the royal treasury, and suspended him from office. Las Alas claimed that Méndez and Menéndez Márquez had conspired against him. The king had given governor Méndez authorization to name his own lieutenant and successor, and Méndez chose his nephew, Juan García de Navia. Rather than attack governor Méndez directly, Argüelles conducted a letter-writing campaign against García and other officials appointed by Méndez, and against Méndez's handling of the Guale rebellion.

Juan Menéndez Márquez traveled to Mexico City several times to collect the situado for the presidio of St. Augustine: in 1593 (with Juan de Junco, steward for factor/overseer Alanso de las Alas), and by himself in 1596, 1597, 1599 and 1600. Menéndez Márquez was imprisoned several times while accountant: in Havana in 1594, and in St. Augustine in 1610 and 1611. In 1606 Juan de las Cabezas Altamirano, Bishop of Santiago de Cuba and Florida, visited Florida. Menéndez Márquez commanded the soldiers that escorted the bishop on his tour of the missions in the colony. Menéndez Márquez traveled on leave to Spain in 1619. In 1622 Governor Juan de Salinas went to The Bahamas in hopes of salvaging cargo from the ships of the Spanish treasure fleet that had wrecked that year, and Menéndez Márquez went with him to take custody of any gold and silver that was recovered. In 1620 he was appointed governor of Popayán and served in that position until his death in 1627. Juan left his son Francisco Menéndez Márquez as his deputy, and Francisco served as acting treasurer until his father's death in 1627; he officially became the treasurer in 1628.
