= Pre-1600 Atlantic hurricane seasons =

This is a list of all known or suspected Atlantic hurricanes up to 1599. Although most storms likely went unrecorded, and many records have been lost, recollections of hurricane occurrences survive from some sufficiently populated coastal areas, and rarely, ships at sea that survived the tempests.

Observation data for years before 1492 is completely unavailable because Indigenous cultures in North America typically did not utilize written language to keep records in the pre-Columbian era, and written records in Mesoamerican languages have either not survived or have not yet been deciphered. Scientists now regard even data from the early years of the Columbian era as suspicious because Renaissance scientists and sailors made no distinction between tropical cyclones and extratropical systems, and incomplete because European exploration of North America and European colonization of the Americas reached only scattered areas in the 16th century.

However, paleotempestological research allows reconstruction of pre-historic hurricane activity trends on timescales of centuries to millennia. A theory has been postulated that an anti-phase pattern exists between the Gulf of Mexico coast and the East Coast of the United States. During the quiescent periods, a more northeasterly position of the Azores High would result in more hurricanes being steered towards the Atlantic coast. During the hyperactive period, more hurricanes were steered towards the Gulf coast as the Azores High—controlled by the North Atlantic oscillation—was shifted to a more southwesterly position near the Caribbean. Few major hurricanes struck the Gulf coast during 3000 BC–1400 BC and again during the most recent millennium; these quiescent intervals were separated by a hyperactive period during 1400 BC and AD 1000, when catastrophic hurricanes frequently struck the Gulf coast, and their landfall frequencies increased by a factor of three to five. On the Atlantic coast, probability of landfalling hurricanes has doubled in the recent millennium compared to the one and a half millennia before.

Using sediment samples from Puerto Rico, the Gulf coast and the Atlantic coast from Florida to New England, Michael E. Mann et al. (2009) found consistent evidence of a peak in Atlantic tropical cyclone activity during the Medieval Warm Period followed by a subsequent lull in activity.

== Systems ==
~ – only paleotempestological evidence

=== Pre-1500 ===
Year	Date (GC)	Area(s) affected	Damage/notes
~1330 BC	unknown	Nicaragua	"Hurricane Elisenda", similar to Hurricane Joan–Miriam.
~250 BC	unknown	Belize	A major hurricane landfall identified in sediment cores from Gales Point and Mullins River.
~465	unknown	Belize	A major hurricane landfall identified in sediment cores from the Great Blue Hole.
~765	unknown	Belize	A major hurricane landfall identified in sediment cores from the Great Blue Hole.
~795	unknown	Belize	A major hurricane landfall identified in sediment cores from the Great Blue Hole.
~830	unknown	Alabama	Presumably a category 4 or 5 hurricane that made landfall near Mobile Bay.
~885	unknown	Belize	A major hurricane landfall identified in sediment cores from the Great Blue Hole.
~1050	unknown	Belize	A major hurricane landfall identified in sediment cores from the Great Blue Hole.
~1140	unknown	Alabama	Presumably a category 4 or 5 hurricane that made landfall near Mobile Bay.
~1250	unknown	Belize	A major hurricane landfall identified in sediment cores from the Great Blue Hole.
~1350±55	unknown	New England	Intense prehistoric hurricane making landfall near Rhode Island, similar to the 1815 and 1938 storms.
~1310	unknown	Belize	A major hurricane landfall identified in sediment cores from the Great Blue Hole.
~1330	unknown	Belize	A major hurricane landfall identified in sediment cores from the Great Blue Hole.
~1430±20	unknown	New England	Intense prehistoric hurricane making landfall near Rhode Island, similar to the 1815 and 1938 storms.
~1465	unknown	Belize	A major hurricane landfall identified in sediment cores from the Great Blue Hole. This might be the hurricane described by Diego de Landa in his book Relación de las cosas de Yucatán. The hurricane was described as being very strong and destroyed most trees in Mayan lands. Diego de Landa places the hurricane around 1463–1464 (22 or 23 years after the destruction of Mayapan, dated by him at 1441).
1494	Late September ~24 [O.S. Mid- September ~15]	Hispaniola	A "violent hurricane" struck Hispaniola near La Isabela from the southwest. This was the first hurricane in the Atlantic basin observed and reported by Europeans as it occurred during Christopher Columbus's second voyage to Hispaniola. His fleet arrived at Saona on 23 September [O.S. 14 September] 1494, and the storm occurred shortly after this time.
1495	late October	Hispaniola	Also affected La Isabela, damaging some of the ships in the harbor. "When the hurricane reached the harbor, it whirled the ships round as they lay at anchor, snapped their cables, and sank three of them with all who were on board."
=== 1500–1524 ===
Year	Date (GC)	Area(s) affected	Damage/notes
~1500	unknown	Belize, Leeward Antilles?	A "giant hurricane", by far the strongest to strike Belize since the 3rd millennium BC. Identified in sediment cores from Gales Point and Mullins River, it is assumed "to have caused devastating large-scale social disruptions" among postclassical Maya civilization. Could be identical with the ~1515 Belize hurricane identified in sediment cores from the Great Blue Hole. An extreme storm surge struck Bonaire around 1500, too. Given the sheer magnitude of the event, however, particularly in comparison to Hurricane Hattie (Belize) and Hurricane Ivan (Bonaire), some conclude this might have been caused by an underwater earthquake. Reportedly, a massive tsunami hit the coast of Venezuela in 1498—one of the earliest reported in the Caribbean—that smashed the natural levee between the coast of Cumaná and the Araya Peninsula, thus creating the Gulf of Cariaco.
1500	late July	Bahamas	Vicente Yáñez Pinzón lost two caravels with their crews near Crooked Island, Bahamas; his other two vessels sustained damage but escaped to Hispaniola for repairs. This hurricane is the first known in the Bahamas and possibly Florida.
1502	July 10 [O.S. June 30]	offshore Dominican Republic, Hispaniola	A rapidly moving hurricane with a small diameter probably came from vicinity of Grenada, moving northwesterly through the Mona Passage. On the fourth of the voyages of Christopher Columbus, he predicted the storm and took refuge in a natural harbor on the Dominican Republic. Meanwhile, his rivals refused to heed his warning and sent a convoy of 31 treasure ships toward Spain. According to Bartolomé de las Casas, "twenty ships perished with the storm, without any man, small or great, escaping, and neither dead nor alive could be found." Those drowned included Francisco de Bobadilla and Francisco Roldán. It was the first great maritime disaster in the New World. The only ship that reached Spain held money and belongings of Christopher Columbus, who survived the storm with Rodrigo de Bastidas. The center likely crossed Hispaniola about 40 miles (60 km) east of the city of Santo Domingo, which it "smashed flat." The death toll likely exceeded 500.
1504	unknown	north coast of Colombia	Juan de la Cosa commanded a flotilla of four large carracks (naos in Spanish) to map the Caribbean Region of Colombia. A storm in the Gulf of Urabá wrecked all four vessels, and 175 of 200 men aboard died.
1508	August 12–14 [O.S. August 2–4]	Hispaniola	José Carlos Millás hypothesizes that this storm developed east of the Lesser Antilles and crossed the archipelago near Guadeloupe or Dominica. It perhaps also affected the southern part of Puerto Rico. Moving west-northwest, the eye of this hurricane passed near Santo Domingo, leaving the city devastated and many men lost there and in the greater part of the island. According to Gonzalo Fernández de Oviedo y Valdés, the natives said they had never witnessed a storm "as intense or even similar in their lives, and they did not remember having heard or seen anything so frightful in their lives or in those of their forefathers." The hurricane demolished the village of Buenaventura "to the level of the ground" and destroyed its entire population. This hurricane drove the ship of Juan Ponce de León onto rocks at Yuna River, but it survived intact.
1508	August 26 [O.S. August 16]	Puerto Rico	Hurricane San Roque of 1508 First recorded record of a tropical cyclone in Puerto Rico. Reported by Juan Ponce de León. The caravel of Juan Ponce de León left Santo Domingo, but another storm 13 days after the preceding storm beached it on the southwest coast of Puerto Rico at Guaynia. Affected the southern coast of the island from Guayanilla, Puerto Rico, westward.
1509	August 8 [O.S. July 29]	Hispaniola	This hurricane moved past Santo Domingo just after the festivities marking the arrival of Diego Columbus as the new governor of the Indies on July 20 [O.S. July 10]. According to Oviedo, it was "greater than the one of last year, not doing so much damage to the houses, although much greater in the country."
1510	July	Hispaniola	N/A
1511	3 August	Panama	Geronimo de Aguilar and Gonzalo Guerrero, both of whom had been on an expedition with Balboa to visit Panama in 1510. Sailing in Panama in 1511, their ships were caught in a hurricane. Aguilar and Guerrero were among the survivors taken prisoner by the Lowland Maya. Aguilar would later play the role of translator when he joined the Cortes expedition that arrived in the Yucatán in 1519.
1514	unknown	Puerto Rico	Andrés de Haro reported this storm several months afterwards, but the exact date remains unknown.
1515	July	Puerto Rico	The royal officials told the monarch that one had caused the deaths of many Indians.
~1515	unknown	Belize	A major hurricane landfall identified in sediment cores from the Great Blue Hole.
1519	unknown	near Jamaica, Cuba	Eighteen men from a caravel near Jamaica survived a "minor hurricane." Aboard the vessel were Alonso de Zuazo and two Tavira sisters, which name the hurricane colloquially bears. The storm moved toward southern Pinar del Río Province in western Cuba.
1520	unknown	Hispaniola	Hurricane affected eastern Hispaniola.
1523	unknown	Florida West Coast	Two ships and their crews lost off the west coast of Florida.
=== 1525–1549 ===
Year	Date (GC)	Area(s) affected	Damage/notes
1525	late October	Western Cuba	Hernán Cortés sent a vessel to Trinidad, Cuba. Juan de Avalos commanded a ship to Veracruz to supply his relative Hernán Cortés and the conquistadors. A "very severe" hurricane sunk the ship west of Havana, killing the captain, two Franciscan friars, and seventy seamen, but eight persons survived.
1525	unknown	Honduras	Hurricane made landfall at the newly established colony of Triunfo de la Cruz (Tela).
1526	June	North Carolina	Lucas Vázquez de Ayllón lost a Spanish brigantine under his command amid the treacherous Frying Pan Shoals offshore from the mouth of Cape Fear River; the colonization attempt involving Francisco de Chicora ultimately failed.
1526	October 14–15 [O.S. October 4–5]	Puerto Rico, Eastern Hispaniola	Hurricane San Francisco of 1526 Millás hypothesizes that this hurricane progressed westward or west-northwestward and therefore also might have affected the northern group of the Leeward Islands and the Virgin Islands. A violent hurricane moved slowly over northern Puerto Rico on 4 and 5 October. The storm started at night, lasted 24 hours, and ruined the major part of the City of San Juan, Puerto Rico, including the church, and caused much damage to haciendas, agriculture, and wide spread flooding. One source describes the storm in both 1526 and 1527.
1527	circa October 30–31 [O.S. October 20–21]	Western Cuba	In the ill-fated Narváez expedition, Pánfilo de Narváez reached Santa Cruz del Sur, Cuba. He then sent two of his six vessels under the captains Pantoja and Álvar Núñez Cabeza de Vaca to the port of Trinidad, Cuba to procure provisions. A "violent storm" destroyed the two ships in port, taking the lives of sixty or seventy persons and twenty horses aboard them; about thirty persons survived the storm on land. Pánfilo de Narváez and his four ships reached Trinity on 5 November. This storm may continue from or into another tropical cyclone this season. Álvar Núñez Cabeza de Vaca delivered a detailed report on this hurricane but did not provide the exact date. Millás provides the date here given. Douglas places this hurricane in early November.
1527	November	upper Texas coast	If this storm occurred, then it would be one of two November hurricanes to hit Texas . Some sources state that a storm sank a poorly anchored boat of Pánfilo de Narváez off Galveston Island, but this recollection seemingly conflates the previous storm in Trinidad, Cuba, with the misfortunes of the remnant of the expedition off the upper Texas coast the following autumn. The storm apparently caused as many as two hundred deaths. Alternatively, perhaps a continuation of another storm this year. Charlton W. Tebeau dates the loss of a Spanish fleet to 1528.
1527	unknown	Eastern Hispaniola	Hurricane made landfall at Santo Domingo.
1528	June 23 or 30 [O.S. June 13 or 20]	Aruba	This hurricane struck a vessel in the Caribbean north of Aruba, and the winds drove the stricken vessel westward for nearly four days until it ran aground on Serrana Bank. A castaway reportedly lived on the cay for eight years before he was rescued, which eventually spun to the tale of Pedro Serrano.
1528	October 2 [O.S. September 22]	Apalachee Bay, Florida	Narváez expedition in 1528 visited the Tampa and Tallahassee areas. Soon after their departure from the Apalachee Bay in upper west Florida, they were shipwrecked by a hurricane storm. Only 10 or so survivors out of more than 400 crew. The voyage lasted from 22 September to 6 November.
1528	unknown	Hispaniola	A letter, dated 2 November 1528 reports a ship lost on its way from Mexico to Santo Domingo.
1529	28–29 July	Puerto Rico	Hurricane made landfall at San Juan, Puerto Rico.
~1530	unknown	Belize	A major hurricane landfall identified in sediment cores from the Great Blue Hole.
1530	August 5 [O.S. July 26]	Puerto Rico	Hurricane Santa Ana of 1530 First of three successive tropical cyclones to affect Puerto Rico in 1530. This hurricane of modest intensity brought much rain to Puerto Rico. It affected the entire island and destroyed half of the houses in San Juan, Puerto Rico. Island only had population of 3,100 at the time.
1530	September 1 [O.S. August 22]	Puerto Rico	Hurricane San Hipólito of 1530 This tropical storm or weak hurricane brought much more rain than violent winds and caused more extensive flooding and crop damage.
1530	September 10 [O.S. August 31]	Puerto Rico	Hurricane San Ramón of 1530 A violent hurricane struck Puerto Rico nine days later. Floods isolated communities and drowned an uncounted number of persons to death. The hurricane greatly damaged livestock and agriculture and so distressed the Spanish colonists that they considered abandoning Puerto Rico altogether. The barrage of hurricanes during 1530 brought a condition of great suffering and poverty on Puerto Rico, which persisted for several years.
1533	October 31-November 2 [O.S. October 21–23]	Leeward Islands	Oviedo mentions the case of two vessels that sailed from Santo Domingo to Spain, but were knocked off course by a hurricane probably north of the Leeward Islands, and returned to Puerto Plata forty days later.
1533	unknown	Puerto Rico	The destruction of 26 July, 23 August, and 31 August killed "so many slaves." This event may refer to the three tropical cyclones that struck Puerto Rico in 1530.
1537	July or August	Puerto Rico	In July and August, three storms of wind and water punished Puerto Rico. River currents carried away and destroyed plantations on the riverbanks. The floods drowned many slaves and cattle to death. This season caused even more damage than that of 1530 did. The storm put Puerto Ricans in great necessity and increased their will to depart the island of Puerto Rico. This event may continue as the succeeding event.
1537	unknown	northwest Cuba	The carrack (nao in Spanish) San Juan, coming from Spain with valuable merchandise as cargo, was lost 5 leagues east of Havana during a hurricane. The 200-ton carrack Santa Catalina, carrying gold and silver from Mexico under captain Francisco López, sank in Havana Harbor during the hurricane.
1541	25 December	Venezuela	A hurricane-like storm destroyed the remains of Nueva Cádiz. However, a tsunami perhaps caused all this damage.
1545	August 20 [O.S. August 10]	Dominican Republic	Gonzalo Fernández de Oviedo y Valdés delivers an eyewitness account on this small but very intense hurricane. It came from the south-southeast, passed west of the capital of Santo Domingo, killed "many" or a "large number of" persons there, and moved rapidly north-northwestward. This storm may continue as another storm attributed to this season.
1545	September 17–18 [O.S. September 7–8]	Puerto Rico, Hispaniola	Excessive rains from this large, slow-moving tropical storm caused the greater damage.
1545	unknown	Mexico	A merchant carrack (nao in Spanish) coming from Spain wrecked on the Veracruz reef system and totally lost 100,000 pesos of cargo. Most persons aboard the carrack, however, were saved. This occurred during a "norther."
1545	unknown	Cuba	Hurricane made landfall at Havana.
1546	September 3 [O.S. August 24]	Puerto Rico	Hurricane made landfall at San Juan, Puerto Rico.
1546	unknown	Dominican Republic	Hurricane affected the Dominican Republic.
1548	unknown	Hispaniola, Santo Domingo	N/A
1549	unknown	Florida	Hernando de Escalante Fontaneda survived a shipwreck due to a hurricane off Florida, and the Calusa rescued the crew and passengers. They then sacrificed all the other castaways but enslaved him; he escaped after 17 years in captivity and reported the tale.
1549	unknown	Hispaniola	The storm wrecked the vessel San Juan in the port of Nombre de Dios near Santo Domingo.
=== 1550–1574 ===
Year	Date (GC)	Area(s) affected	Damage/notes
1550	unknown	off Florida Keys	The 200-ton Spanish carrack (nao in Spanish) Visitación left Havana with treasure for Spain. She was "lost during a hurricane" off the Florida Keys.
1551	unknown	Cuba	Of this storm, Marcos de J. Melero mentions only the year in the Anales de la Academia de Ciencias de la Habana.
1551	unknown	Gulf of Honduras	Diego de Landa reported this storm. One ship sunk with many persons aboard her; all but five passengers drowned.
1552	28–29 August	Dominican Republic	Hurricane made landfall at Santo Domingo.
1552	2–4 September	Mexico	Hurricane made landfall at Veracruz.
1553	September 22 [O.S. September 12]	Hispaniola	Affected Santo Domingo.
circa 1553	unknown	Florida West Coast	This storm caused seven hundred casualties. Several sources contain similar descriptions of storms for this season; they may describe one or two or three separate tropical cyclones. This event may duplicate or continue the succeeding entry.
1553	unknown	Texas	A Spanish treasure fleet of twenty or more ships, sailed from Veracruz for Havana. Five days into its voyage, a hurricane struck the fleet in the Gulf of Mexico and scattered its ships widely. Three of the ship ultimately reached Spain, and another returned to Veracruz. No one ever heard from any of the other sixteen or more ships again. Many men undoubtedly drowned. The 220-ton San Estevan under Captain Francisco del Mecerno, the 220-ton Santa Maria de Yciar under Captain Alonso Ozosi, and a carrack (nao in Spanish) all wrecked on Padre Island. These shipwrecks resemble those in the Mansfield Cut Underwater Archeological District, dated probably to April 1554. Alternatively, this storm may continue or duplicate the preceding entry. Several sources contain similar descriptions of storms for this season; they may describe one or two or three separate tropical cyclones.
1554	April or May (?)	offshore South Texas	The New Spain fleet, a Spanish treasure fleet, comprised top-heavy galleons, difficult to maneuver, with primitive techniques for coping with storms and insufficient experienced navigators. Three ships from this fleet, Santa María de Yciar, Espíritu Santo, and San Esteban, were lost in a storm off Padre Island. A few survivors escaped in a small boat; others attempted to walk south back to Mexico, but hostile natives killed most of them. Conquistador Ángel de Villafañe participated in the salvage operation that summer, which recovered half of the lost treasure.
1554	June (?)	Gulf of Mexico	Three vessels came from Mexico. A hurricane, probably weak, caught them off the northwestern coast of Cuba and carried them toward the coast of Florida, stranding them. The storm neither sank nor badly disabled any known ship.
1554	August or September	Bahamas	A storm near Great Inagua wrecked two vessels carrying a load of silver.
1554	August to October	Mona Passage	In August or September, a Spanish caravel (nao in Spanish) ship of Juan González departed Santo Domingo for San Juan, Puerto Rico, with Bástidas Sanabria, son of Cristóbal de Sanabria, aboard her. As a result of a hurricane, the sea "swallowed" the ship somewhere in the Mona Passage. No one ever found any survivors or wreck debris; however, Cathedral of San Juan Bautista hosted a funeral Mass for the deceased. Cristóbal de Sanabria, a cleric in San Juan, told of the misfortune on 16 October.
1554	November 14 [O.S. November 4]	Cuba	Cosme Rodríguez Farfán commanded a fleet of four vessels from Havana to San Juan, Puerto Rico. A storm hit the fleet off the coast of Oriente Province. The ship of the admiral sank; a small caravel also sank, and all but two people aboard that ship drowned to death. This event may continue another storm listed for this year.
circa 1554	unknown	Bermuda	An overloaded, overcrowded galleon San Miguel ventured to bring great wealth from Veracruz to save the king, presumably Charles V, Holy Roman Emperor, from bankruptcy. A long convoy of ships preceded her to protect her from French (and other) pirates. A week after departing Veracruz, two wind storms in the Gulf of Mexico left her with a broken mainmast, a wreck separated from the convoy, drifting for weeks within sight of Cuba and the Bahamas. A hurricane struck the San Miguel, and her crew cast all goods overboard except the bullion of the king. She lost her rudder but somehow survived, half-grounded on a reef. That hurricane caught the remaining ships in the convoy near Bermuda, and its leading ship sank. A caravel rescued the suffering passengers and crew of the San Miguel and sent her bullion cargo to Spain on a safer, more seaworthy ship. Twenty-five ships survived the trans-Atlantic voyage, carrying enough gold for the king. A Franco-Spanish War with considerable piracy apparently reached the Caribbean the next year. This event may continue another storm listed for this year or another season. One source dates this event to 1554, but the hurricane seemingly occurred between the beginning of the Viceroyalty of Luís de Velasco in New Spain (1550) and the beginning of the Italian War of 1551–1559, which involved France and Spain, suggesting that these storms struck in 1550.
1555	unknown	Bahama Channel	The Capitana of New Spain fleet lost in storm.
1557	October 27 [O.S. October 17]	Havana and Matanzas, Cuba	A severe hurricane struck almost the western part of the island, extending from Pinar del Río eastward to Matanzas. It came from the western Caribbean Sea, moving probably from a southerly or a southwesterly direction.
1559	19 September	near Pensacola, Florida, Mobile, Alabama	First European documented hurricane hitting Florida. Tristán de Luna y Arellano attempted to start a colony around present day Pensacola with a fleet of eleven to thirteen vessels, five hundred soldiers, a thousand to eleven hundred civilians, 240 horses, and supplies; the vessels landed at Pensacola Bay on 14 and 15 September. On 19 September, a "great tempest from the north", a "tropical storm", or "hurricane" blew for 24 hours and scattered the still-loaded ships. Several ships—four or five navios with topsails, a galleon with a small amount of Mexican silver, and a small barque sent east of the onshore camp on a coast-exploration mission—shattered to pieces "with great loss of life" and cargo. The wreckage of San Juan galleon now defines the Emanuel Point Shipwreck Site. The storm also carried one caravel and its cargo into a grove farther ashore than the distance of an arquebus shot. One surviving ship sailed immediately to Mexico for relief. The colony attempted to rely on native villages for sustenance, but its ventures acquired little food; the lack of food ultimately contributed to abandonment of the colony in 1561. One source lists this event as three separate storms but suggests that they might represent different accounts of the same event.
1561	June 24 [O.S. June 14]	North Carolina	Ángel de Villafañe evacuated the colony of Tristán de Luna y Arellano from Pensacola to Havana with the San Juan and three other vessels. Afterward, he commanded the fleet to Santa Elena, la Florida, arriving on 6 June [O.S. 27 May]. The fleet then continued farther northward, exploring the coast until they sailed around Cape Hatteras. This fleet (or, less likely, a Spanish sloop under Pedro Menéndez de Avilés) in 1561 captured Don Luis from Ajacan, often identified with Virginia but perhaps farther south, even considerably south of Hatteras. In a storm off Cape Hatteras, the caravel of Villafañe almost foundered, and two vessels of the fleet undoubtedly perished. After the tragic loss of two vessels, the two surviving vessels ultimately retired to Santo Domingo or Havana.
1563	unknown	near Cape Canaveral, Florida	The 250-ton Spanish galleon La Madelena, loaded with treasure in Vera Cruz, sailed under captain Cristobel Rodríquez to Spain. During a storm, she wrecked on a shoal near Cape Canaveral. Only 16 of the three hundred aboard her survived.
1563	August to October	Atlantic Ocean	Five vessels missing at latitude of Bermuda.
circa 1564	unknown	possibly North Carolina	"None of the people survived" from a wreck on the coast.
1565	July 31—August 2 [O.S. July 21–23]	Atlantic Ocean	Pedro Menéndez de Avilés commanded a fleet of five ships; a violent hurricane east of the Leeward Islands dispersed them.
1565	September 22 [O.S. September 12]	Florida East Coast	A powerful hurricane struck the French fleet of Jean Ribault as it sailed toward St. Augustine to attack the Spanish. The storm wrecked most of Ribault's ships along the coast between Matanzas Inlet and Cape Canaveral, scattering survivors. This disaster allowed Pedro Menéndez de Avilés to capture Fort Caroline, effectively ending French control in Florida
1566	September 13–16 [O.S. September 3–6]	Florida	An offshore hurricane on the northeast Florida and lower/upper Georgia coastal waters.
1566	September 24–26 [O.S. September 14–16]	Florida	A more severe offshore hurricane on the northeast Florida and Georgia coastal waters.
1567	unknown	Near Dominica	A storm off Dominica wrecked six ships carrying 3 million pesos (77 metric tons (76 long tons) of silver). Natives of the island killed all survivors. Continuing bad weather delayed serious salvage efforts to 1568. In their zeal to locate the treasure, Spanish salvage operators tortured the inhabitants, but no one knows what happened to the cargo.
1568	August 22 [O.S. August 12]	Yucatán Channel	A hurricane of large diameter but only weak or moderate intensity affected the fleet of English privateer John Hawkins near Cape San Antonio, Cuba.
1568	September 3 [O.S. August 24]	Puerto Rico	Hurricane San Bartolomé of 1568 Diego de Torres Vargas writes of a severe hurricane that caused widespread damage in San Juan, Puerto Rico and in Santo Domingo. First hurricane to be named with "Saint of the Day" affecting Puerto Rico (previous ones back to 1508 were labeled by historians). This storm perhaps continued in the succeeding entry.
1568	7 September [O.S. 28 August]	Florida	A second hurricane, perhaps the same storm as the preceding entry, struck the fleet of English privateer John Hawkins. His six ships then straggled into the Spanish-controlled port of San Juan de Ulúa, Veracruz, New Spain, on 15 September, initially under a truce. Battle of San Juan de Ulúa (1568) against the Spanish, however, ensued on 23 September, and only two English vessels returned to Europe.
1569	September	Bahamas	A hurricane passed through the Old Bahama Channel
1570	during or after September	Atlantic Ocean	Spanish lost four ships between Vera Cruz and Spain.
1571	~September or October	Florida	Heavy flooding in St. Augustine, Florida, two ships lost
1571	18–21 October	Cuba, Jamaica	Hurricane affected Cuba and Jamaica
1571	unknown	Florida Coast	The 300-ton galleon San Ignacio under captaincy of Juan de Canavas with 22 iron cannon and the 340-ton Santa Maria de la Limpia Concepción together carried 2.5 million pesos in treasure. They wrecked off Cape Canaveral the Florida coast during a storm. Few survivors attempted to reach St. Augustine, Florida, in two longboats; however, natives massacred most of them. Marine salvage recovered nothing.
1573	August	Atlantic Ocean	A hurricane struck a ship in the vicinity of the Virgin Islands.
1574	August ~27	Gulf of Mexico and Mexico	Spanish treasure fleet sailed from Spain on 29 June. After reaching the Gulf of Mexico, a "bad storm" struck and scattered the ships widely. The storm sunk the 300-ton carrack (nao in Spanish) Santa Ana under captaincy of Pedro de Paredes, the carracks under ownership of Antonio Sánchez de Armas, and the carrack under ownership of Carrejas. The storm also wrecked an urca on the coast of Coatzacoalcos and drowned five men to death, but survivors saved all its cargo. The wrecked ships included the 650-ton Santa Maria de Begonia. A violent hurricane on 27 August (possibly Julian calendar) struck between Jamaica and Cuba.
1574	unknown	Florida East Coast, Cape Canaveral, Florida	In 1574, Pedro Menéndez Márquez and his crew were shipwrecked by a hurricane near Cape Canaveral while sailing north to St. Augustine. They ended completing the journey by walking an approximate 130 mile journey along the Florida east coast beaches, inlets, and swamps up to arrive at St. Augustine.
=== 1575–1599 ===
Year	Date (GC)	Area(s) affected	Damage/notes
1575	October 1 [O.S. September 21]	Puerto Rico	Hurricane San Mateo of 1575 Diego de Torres Vargas mentions severe storm mentioned that struck the island on the feast of Saint Matthew. Last recorded tropical storm to impact Puerto Rico during sixteenth century.
1576	unknown	Hispaniola	Hurricane made landfall near Monte Cristi Province.
1577	August or September	Cuba, Jamaica	Hurricane affected Cuba and Jamaica
1577	28 September – 8 October	Atlantic Ocean	Hurricane traveled from 27°N to 38°N
1578	unknown	Hispaniola	Hurricane made landfall near San José de Ocoa Province.
1578	October	Cuba, Jamaica	Hurricane affected Cuba and Jamaica
1579	circa August	Caribbean	A storm struck a vessel sailing from Havana to Isla Margarita, Venezuela.
1579	13 September	offshore Bermuda	A hurricane affected Bermuda from offshore
1579	26 September	Bermuda	Hurricane made landfall in Bermuda
1579	unknown	Jamaica	Hurricane made landfall in Jamaica
1579	unknown	Atlantic Ocean	A storm sank the 600-ton Almirante of Spanish Armada.
1583	August 19 [O.S. August 9]	Hispaniola	Hurricane made landfall at Santo Domingo.
1583	9 September	Atlantic Ocean	N/A
1583	mid-September [O.S. early September]	Hispaniola	Archbishop Alfonso López de Avila of Roman Catholic Archdiocese of Santo Domingo, reported a hurricane that "ruined the fruit at the beginning of September (Julian calendar)." Could be identical with the 19 August storm.
1586	June 23–26 [O.S. June 13–16]	Roanoke Island	Original European Roanoke Island settlers arrived in 1585. After experiencing a hurricane in 1586 that Ralph Lane reported: "The weather was so sore and the storm so great than our anchors would not hold, and no ship of them all but either broke or lost their anchors.", the settlers moved back to England.
1586	unknown	Old Bahama Channel	A Spanish treasure fleet of 61 ships under Juan Tello de Guzmán gathered from all parts of the Caribbean at Havana and then left for Spain. During a storm in Old Bahama Channel, the fleet lost: the 120-ton ship of the line (navío in Spanish)San Francisco under Juan Alonso from Puerto Rico, the 120-ton navío Nuestra Señora de la Concepción under Simón Rixo (or Rizo) from Puerto Rico, the 120-ton carrack (nao in Spanish) under captaincy of Martín de Irigoyen from Mexico, and; five or six other vessels.; Surviving ships included the 120-ton navío San Sebastián under Diego Hernández from Puerto Rico.
1587	August 31 [O.S. August 21]	Roanoke Island	John White reestablished the colony at Roanoke Island in July, 1587. Admiral Francis Drake was forced to cut the cables on his ship to spend six days riding out the storm at sea. He would regroup in Roanoke after the storm. John White left a group of colonists here and returned to England with the intention of returning with supplies and more colonists. When he did return in August 1590, no sign to the 1587 was ever found.
1588	September 20 [O.S. September 10]	Havana, Cuba	A furious hurricane, noted as more destructive than that of 1557, made landfall near Havana.
1588	4–6 November	Colombia	Hurricane made landfall near Cartagena de Indias.
1589	7 August	Leeward Islands	A hurricane affected the Leeward Islands
1589	12 September	Old Bahama Channel	English squadron (naval) awaited the return of Spanish ships from the Caribbean. Philip II of Spain, king of Iberian Union, consequently ordered that the Spanish Navy (Armada in Spanish) under captain general Alváro Flores de Quiñones, Tierra Firma fleet, and Spanish treasure fleet (Flota de Nueva España in Spanish) from Vera Cruz all meet in Havana and travel together in convoy to Spain. The convoy of 75 to 100 ships left Havana on 9 September and entered Old Bahama Channel. A hurricane passed through the Bahamas Channel on 12 September. Even before the hurricane, the 350-ton merchant carrack (nao in Spanish) Santa Catalina under ownership of Fernando Ome and captaincy of Domingo Ianez Ome, coming from Mexico with cargo, sank in 30 fathoms (180 ft; 55 m) of water "in about 30 degrees of latitude." The 400-ton nao Jesús María under ownership of Domingo Sauli and captaincy of Francisco Salvago, coming from Mexico, also sank in similar circumstances. A third merchant nao also sank with these two. In the hurricane at the month of Old Bahama Channel, the Almiranta of Flota de Nueva España developed a bad leak, fired cannon for assistance, and sank quickly with her great treasure in very deep water. This event may continue as another storm listed for this season. Robert F. Marx accuses Dutch historian Jan Huyghen van Linschoten of misinformation in telling that only 14 or 15 of 220 ships sailing for Iberian Union survived the year and that about 99 disappeared near Florida. He contends that Iberian Union lost only five ships this year: four in this storm in Old Bahama Channel and one returning from Goa. The location of the sinking, "in about 30 degrees of latitude", suggests that the term "Bahama Channel" in various sources may refer to the northern extension of Straits of Florida, not to Old Bahama Channel, as here assumed.
1589	unknown	Old Bahama Channel	The 120-ton Espíritu Santo under Miguel Baltasar, transporting sugar and hides from Puerto Rico, joined the preceding flotilla convoy in Havana. About 50 leagues from the Old Bahama Channel, a tempest struck the Spanish treasure fleet. Howling northeasterly winds lasted four days. On the first day, the sea "swallowed" a total of ten carracks (naos in Spanish), possibly including the Espíritu Santo. Some ships returned to Cuba; others proceeded to the Iberian Union. This storm may continue as (or be identical with) the preceding storm or another storm or storms this season.
1589	unknown	Florida	A hurricane made landfall near Cape Canaveral.
1589	unknown	Florida East Coast	Gonzalo Méndez de Canço, later governor of Florida, reports that Martín Pérez de Olazábal commanded a fleet; during a storm, one of his ships wrecked at Cape Canaveral. San Agustín (now St. Augustine, Florida) assisted four battered and dismasted ships carrying more than 450 persons; one ship entered the port and departed for Spain. The frigate of the presidio at San Agustín also discovered and rescued forty members of the crew of the ship lost on Cape Canaveral.
1590	early November	Gulf of Mexico	Captain general Antonio Navarro de Prado commanded the 63-ship Spanish treasure fleet (Flota de Nueva España) that sailed from Sanlúcar de Barrameda in Iberian Union on 1 August. As the flotilla traversed the Gulf of Mexico and approached San Juan de Ulúa in Vera Cruz, a fierce "norther" struck with 12 hours of hurricane-force wind and rain. The fleet lost fourteen to sixteen ships along the Mexican coast, including: the 280-ton carrack (nao in Spanish ) La Trinidad under captaincy of Bernardo de Paz, trying to enter Vera Cruz during the storm; the 180-ton Portuguese nao La Piedad under captaincy of Cristobal Sánchez Melgarejo, on the shoal of Vera Cruz with eighteen persons and most cargo saved; the 220-ton nao Nuestra Señora del Socorro under captaincy of Pedro Díaz Franco, in the Canal Gallega in Vera Cruz; the 130-ton Portuguese nao Nuestra Señora de la Concepción under captaincy of Miguel Rodríguez, near Vera Cruz; The storm swept two iron cannon from the decks of the San Francisco, heeled over the ship, and left her hold (ship) filled with water more than 6 feet (1.8 m) deep. The surviving 34 vessels on 8 November arrived at Vera Cruz badly damaged.
1591	10 August	Atlantic Ocean	English pirates menaced Spanish vessels considerably during the year. Spain expected 123 sailboats to arrive from the Caribbean, but a fleet of only 77 Spanish vessels, each with tonnage ranging from 200 to 1000, left Havana on 17 July for Spain. At latitude 35°N on 10 August, a northerly gale or hurricane overtook them, and the ship of the admiral of the fleet foundered with 500 men aboard her. [Calendar unknown.] This event may continue the same storm as another event listed for this year.
1591	13–14 August	Atlantic Ocean	Another hurricane hit the fleet three or four days after the first storm, sinking five or six of the largest ships of the fleet, including that of its vice-admiral. All the crews of the sunken vessels perished. [Calendar unknown.] This event may continue the same storm as another event listed for this year.
1591	August 26 [O.S. August 16]	Roanoke Island	"For at this time the wind blew at northeast and direct into the harbor so great a gale that the sea broke extremely on the bar, and the tide went out forcibly at the entrance."
1591	August ~30-31	Atlantic Ocean	About the end of August (maybe Julian calendar), the third gale caught the Spanish fleet at latitude 38°N, during which 22 vessels perished. The fleet thereafter comprised 48 surviving vessels. This event may continue the same storm as another event listed for this year. This or another fleet returned from Bermuda toward Europe after 24 August. That fleet lost 20 ships to a storm or storms, mainly on 1–10 September. Five of the ships in that fleet hosted 387 crew members; however, uncertainty remains regarding how many of them and others perished and survived. This event may continue the same storm as another event listed for this year.
1591	end or August or early September	off Azores	Sir Richard Grenville commanded English ship Revenge (1577) alone against 53 Spanish warships under Alonso de Bazán in Battle of Flores (1591) on the night of 30/31 August. The Spanish armada finally defeated him in the morning and took the English survivors aboard their damaged ships as prisoners of war. Sir Richard Grenville died of his wounds three days later, and his body underwent burial at sea. The winds of a terrible hurricane then arose and wrecked allegedly "over a hundred" Spanish galleons, merchant ships, warships, and other vessels in this fleet and the arriving remnant of the Spanish treasure fleet. The storm drowned their crews and lost their riches to the Iberian Union. The remnant of the captured English warship Revenge ran into the cliffs of Terceira Island. English writer Richard Hakluyt attributes the storm to divine revenge against the Catholic fleet for the death of Sir Grenville. He continues, "For 20 days after the storm they did nothing but fish for dead men that continually came driving on the shore." This event may continue the same storm as another event listed for this year.
1591	6 September	Azores	Within sight of Flores Island (Azores), another gale separated the fleet, and only 25 or 26 sailboats from the Caribbean ultimately reached Spain. This storm likely matches the account in the preceding entry.
1591	21 September	Puerto Rico	A hurricane affected Puerto Rico
1591	24 September	Cuba	A hurricane affected Cuba
1591	September	Florida	Hurricane made landfall near Dry Tortugas.
1591	unknown	coastal Florida	A fleet of 75 to 77 ships left Havana on 27 June. On orders of Philip II of Spain, king of Iberian Union, the mariners left his registered treasure in Havana for safe travel to Spain aboard small, fast zabras. In encounters with storms, the fleet lost at least 29 ships, many off coast of Florida. The terrible storms left Iberian Union with few ships to send to the Indies in 1592. This entry likely matches that of other storms this year.
1591	unknown	Atlantic or Caribbean Sea	Spanish lost a carrack (nao in Spanish) somewhere in the Atlantic Ocean or Caribbean Sea.
1593	July ~25 [O.S. July ~15]	Puerto Rico	A storm passed the seas north of the island.
1594	unknown	Caribbean	One ship lost on its way from Panama to the Lesser Antilles.
1594	unknown	Hispaniola	Hurricane made landfall near Santo Domingo.
1594	unknown	Cuba	Hurricane made landfall near Havana. Day of San Lucas
1595	29–30 August	Cuba	Hurricane made landfall near Havana.
1595	unknown	offshore Florida	The 180 ton Spanish carrack (nao in Spanish) Santa Margarita (not to be confused with the wreck of the Santa Margarita recovered with the Atocha near Key West) under captaincy of Gonçalo de la Roché sailed alone from Santo Domingo to Havana and from thence sailed for Spain laden with 6,000,000 pesos in gold bullion and silver coins. Ship sank during a storm in the high seas off the Florida coast possibly near the entrance to Biscayne Bay.
1597	~September–November	Jamaica	Morales Padrón reported a hurricane.
1599	~June–July	Bahamas	This hurricane struck Hernando del Castillo near Great Inagua Island.
1599	22 September	Florida	Hurricane made landfall near St. Augustine, Florida.

== See also ==
- List of Atlantic hurricanes
- Atlantic hurricane season
- Paleotempestology
