= List of North Carolina hurricanes (pre-1900) =

The list of North Carolina hurricanes before 1900 encompasses 139 tropical cyclones that affected the U.S. state of North Carolina. Collectively, cyclones in North Carolina during the time period resulted in over 775 direct fatalities during the period. Seven cyclones affected the state in the 1893 season, which was the year with the most tropical cyclones impacting the state during the time period. From the beginning of the official North Atlantic hurricane record in 1851 to 1899, there were 12 years without a known tropical cyclone affecting the state. The strongest hurricane to hit the state during the official record was the San Ciriaco hurricane of 1899, which struck the state with winds of 120 mph (195 km/h), although the 1821 Norfolk and Long Island Hurricane may have been stronger.

Historical data prior to 1700 is sparse due to lack of significant European settlements along the coastline; the few storms listed are largely records from Roanoke Colony and later the Province of Carolina. Modern meteorologists believe early storms were tropical cyclones, though due to the time period confirmation is impossible. One theory explaining the disappearance of Roanoke Colony suggests a hurricane destroyed the village, though there is no evidence to prove the theory. It is considered unlikely due to lack of damage to a fence around the village, on which the villagers left an inscription.

== Pre-1700 ==
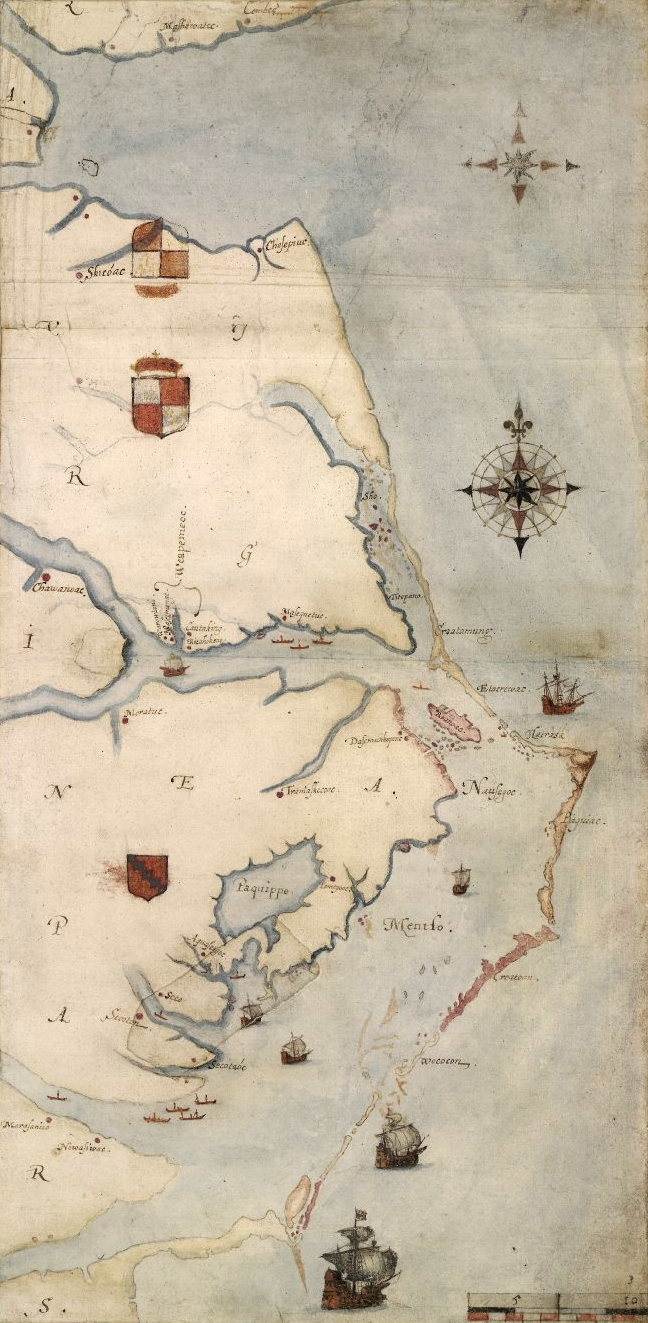
1584 map of Roanoke Colony, which was affected by several hurricanes

- June 1526 – A Spanish brigantine is lost off Wilmington.
- June 14, 1566 – Two vessels in the Spanish fleet of Ángel de Villafañe sink off Cape Hatteras, which is believed to have been caused by a hurricane.
- June 23–June 26, 1586 – A powerful hurricane threatens the fleet of Sir Walter Raleigh in Roanoke Island; its passage influences the settlers to return with Raleigh to England.
- August 31, 1587 – A hurricane passes near or over Roanoke Island, causing rough seas for the fleet of Sir Walter Raleigh.
- August 1590 – John White leads a survey to discover the remains of the Roanoke Colony, but is forced to leave due to an approaching hurricane.
- August 26, 1591 – Strong winds from a hurricane prevent a sailing expedition along the coastline.
- September 6, 1667 – Many buildings are destroyed in association with a hurricane that strikes the northern Outer Banks, which also causes some crop damage.
- August 18, 1669 – A hurricane crosses the northern Outer Banks.
- August 6, 1670 – The Outer Banks are affected by a hurricane.

== 1700s ==
- September 16, 1713 – A strong hurricane causes shipping damage near Cape Fear, and also opens forms several inlets along the Outer Banks.
- August 13, 1728 – Several ships are lost during a hurricane, with one entire crew killed in one vessel.
- October 18, 1749 – A powerful hurricane remains offshore, which causes high tides that capsize nine ships near Ocracoke.
- August 18, 1750 – Five ships are wrecked or driven ashore due to a hurricane.
- September 30, 1752 – A hurricane strikes near Wilmington with high tides and winds; an unknown number of deaths are reported in the state.
- October 22, 1752 – A hurricane affects the state's coastline.
- September 23, 1761 – A new inlet is formed after a hurricane makes landfall on the state.
- October, 1761 – Cape Hatteras is brushed by a major hurricane.
- September 21, 1767 – Several vessels are lost in an offshore storm.
- September 7–8, 1769 – Great Chesapeake Bay Hurricane of 1769. New Bern is severely damaged by unprecedented tides and winds; the flood waters destroy an entire street of houses, along with some of the inhabitants, while the winds down thousands of trees.
- September 1, 1772 – A tropical cyclone washes 40 vessels ashore along Ocracoke, causing 50 fatalities.
- August 26, 1773 – The state is affected by a hurricane.
- August 29, 1775 – The Mid-Atlantic States are first impacted by the Independence Hurricane, which crosses the eastern portion of the state in early September. The hurricane destroys all of the corn crop in the northeastern portion of the state, and kills 163 people in the state. In the aftermath of the hurricane, the Second Continental Congress provide farmers in the northeastern portion of the state with 40 shillings to purchase corn and other supplies.
- August 10, 1777 – The coastline is affected by a tropical cyclone.
- August 11, 1778 – A hurricane produces heavy rainfall in the New Bern area.
- August 11, 1781 – A gale lasts for forty hours at Wilmington in association with a slow-moving hurricane.
- October 7, 1783 – Heavy damage is reported near Wilmington from a hurricane crossing the eastern portion of the state.
- September 23, 1785 – A hurricane strikes Ocracoke, causing beach erosion and killing several cattle.
- July 23, 1788 – A cyclone known as George Washington's Hurricane moves through Virginia, while in eastern North Carolina it damages dozens of vessels.
- August 2, 1795 – A Spanish fleet of 18 vessels are driven ashore near Cape Hatteras by a hurricane.
- August 12, 1795 – The state is struck by a major hurricane that produces heavy rainfall along its path.
- September 5, 1797 – A sloop is lost in Currituck Sound during a storm.

== 1800–1849 ==
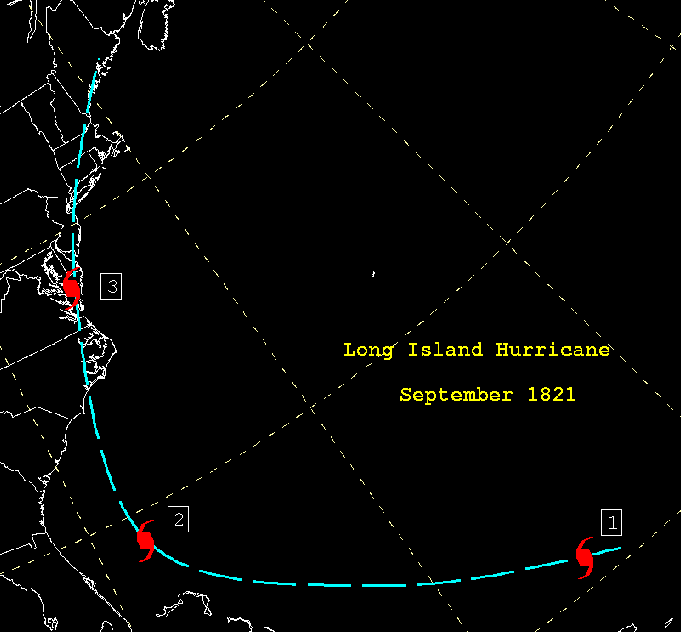
Track map of 1821 Norfolk and Long Island hurricane

- August 31, 1803 – The state is struck by a hurricane.
- September 7, 1804 – The Antigua–Charleston hurricane crosses the central portion of the state.
- August 21, 1806 – Severe damage and tides are reported in the Wilmington area in association with the 1806 Great Coastal hurricane.
- September 28, 1806 – A hurricane causes several shipwrecks near Ocracoke.
- August 28, 1813 – After striking South Carolina, a hurricane crosses the center of the state.
- September 3, 1815 – Cape Lookout is struck by a hurricane, with four deaths reported near Onslow. High tides causes flooding and damage to many homes along the coastline.
- August 8, 1817 – A tropical storm crosses the eastern portion of the state.
- September 10, 1820 – Heavy rainfall and gusty winds are accompanied by a tropical storm in the southern portion of the state.
- September 3, 1821 – The Norfolk and Long Island hurricane moves ashore near Ocracoke, causing strong winds and heavy damage across the eastern portion of the state; several people are killed on Currituck Island.
- September 27, 1822 – Strong winds and heavy rainfall affect the Raleigh area in association with a hurricane.
- September 14, 1824 – A tropical storm crosses the western portion of the state into Virginia.
- June 3, 1825 – Around 50 vessels are driven ashore from an early-season hurricane; the storm causes severe damage to coastal plantations from a high storm tide.
- July 30, 1827 – A minimal hurricane is reported off the coast of North Carolina.
- August 24, 1827 – Two people are killed when the Diamond Shoals Lightship becomes loose from its moorings, due to a landfalling hurricane along the state's coastline. Damage is reported across the eastern portion of the state.
- August 26, 1829 – A tropical storm crosses the state into Virginia.
- August 15, 1830 – A hurricane drives several vessels ashore and causes severe flooding in the Wilmington area.
- August 23, 1830 – A minimal hurricane crosses the eastern portion of the state.
- October 6, 1830 – A hurricane brushes the coastline, causing no known damage in the state.
- September 4, 1834 – Heavy rainfall and moderate winds accompany a small hurricane striking near the North Carolina/South Carolina border, which results in downed trees and flooded rivers.
- September 18, 1835 – After crossing through South Carolina, a tropical storm passes through North Carolina.
- August 18, 1837 – The Calypso Hurricane brushes the Outer Banks after washing out several bridges near Wilmington.
- September 2, 1837 – A hurricane dissipates near or over the state.
- October 9, 1837 – The Racer's Storm capsizes a steamboat near Ocracoke, killing 90 of the 130 passengers aboard; two other vessels are lost.
- October 29, 1837 – Hatteras is affected by a tropical cyclone of unknown strength.
- August 28, 1839 – Paralleling the coastline just offshore, a hurricane causes moderate damage in the Elizabeth City area.
- October 19, 1841 – A hurricane brushes the Outer Banks.
- July 12, 1842 – Several ships are lost and many houses are wrecked when a severe hurricane crosses the entire coastline, resulting in an unknown number of casualties.
- August 24, 1842 – A hurricane destroys three ships when it brushes the state's coastline, resulting in eight casualties.
- October 7, 1842 – Several ships are destroyed as a hurricane parallels the coastline offshore.
- October 5, 1844 – Cape Fear reports gale-force winds in association with an offshore hurricane.
- September 7, 1846 – A slow-moving hurricane forms both the Hatteras and the Oregon Inlets; a vessel is lost offshore during the storm.
- October 13, 1846 – The Great Havana Hurricane of 1846 produces above normal tides along the coastline.

== 1850–1859 ==
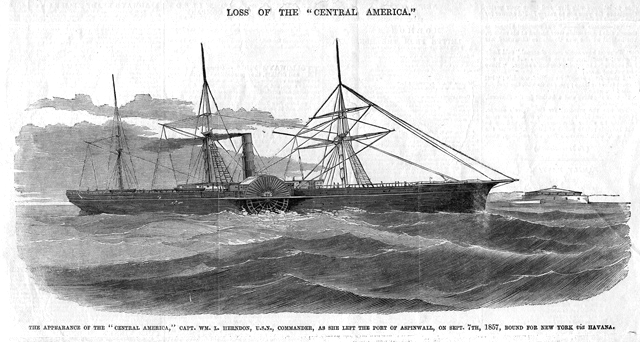
Image of the SS Central America

- July 18, 1850 – Elizabeth City and Wilmington experience great damage from a hurricane passing through the state.
- August 24, 1850 – A hurricane paralleling the coastline capsizes two vessels in the state.
- August 25, 1851 – Gale-force winds are reported along the southern coastline from a tropical storm passing through the state.
- August 28, 1852 – A tropical storm crossing the southeastern United States emerges into the Atlantic Ocean near the North Carolina/South Carolina border.
- October 10, 1852 – The final storm of the season passes through the southeastern portion of the state.
- September 7, 1853 – The coastline receives heavy rainfall from the outer rainbands of an offshore hurricane; a ship is lost offshore from the storm.
- September 9, 1854 – A tropical storm crosses the central portion of the state.
- August 19, 1856 – The state is struck by a tropical storm.
- September 1, 1856 – A tropical storm crosses the central portion of the state.
- September 13, 1857 – A moderate hurricane brushes the Outer Banks, which causes high tides and several shipwrecks; the SS Central America capsizes a short distance offshore, resulting in 424 deaths and contributing to the Panic of 1857.
- September 16, 1858 – A hurricane brushes the Outer Banks.
- September 17, 1859 – A tropical storm crosses through the state, producing light winds and rainfall.

== 1860–1869 ==
- September 27, 1861 – A fast moving hurricane moves ashore near Wilmington.
- October 7, 1861 – The Outer Banks are affected by a tropical storm.
- November 2, 1861 – The Expedition Hurricane crosses the Outer Banks during the American Civil War, which scatters a Union fleet of 75 ships off Cape Hatteras; at least two vessels sink, causing seven deaths, and several other ships are wrecked by Confederate forces during the storm.
- September 18, 1863 – A tropical storm crosses the eastern portion of the state.
- October 29, 1866 – A hurricane passes just east of the state.
- June 23, 1867 – The remnants of a tropical storm being heavy rainfall to the central portion of the state.
- August 1, 1867 – A hurricane recurves just to the east of the state.
- October 5, 1868 – A tropical storm parallels the entire coastline just offshore.

== 1870–1879 ==
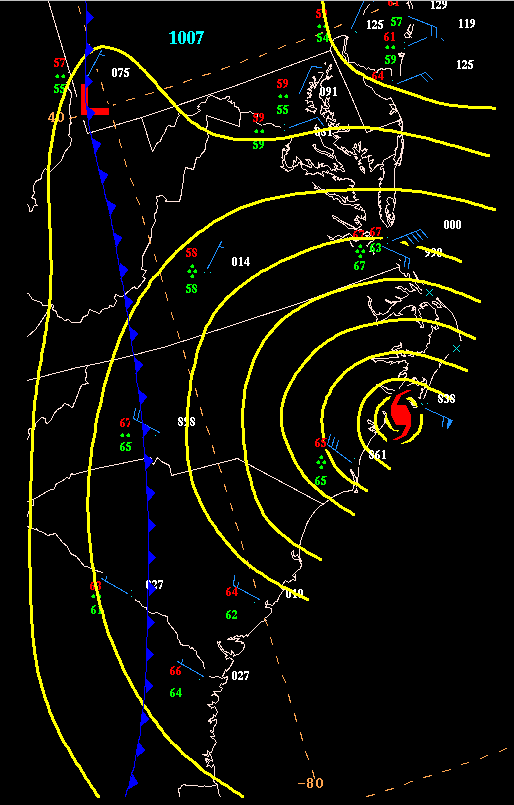
Reconstructed Weather Map of the Gale of 1878

- August 18, 1871 – Looping to the south of the state and striking Georgia, a tropical storm produces gale-force winds and high tides near Wilmington, which capsizes two small vessels.
- August 29, 1871 – A tropical storm parallels the coastline just offshore.
- October 24, 1872 – Wilmington is struck by a tropical storm.
- September 28, 1874 – After moving ashore along South Carolina, a hurricane causes locally severe damage near Wilmington, where its passage results in uprooted trees and several destroyed houses; the hurricane produces high tides, which destroys multiple railroad bridges.
- September 19, 1875 – The remnants of a major hurricane that strikes Indianola, Texas pass through the state.
- September 17, 1876 – A hurricane moves ashore near Wilmington, causing localized severe damage and capsizing several ships; a military camp is destroyed by the storm, and two people drown during the storm.
- September 29, 1877 – An offshore tropical storm drops moderate precipitation in the southern portion of the state.
- October 4, 1877 – After striking Florida as a hurricane, a tropical storm transitions into an extratropical cyclone over the state, which causes severe flooding and winds in the vicinity of the Albemarle Sound.
- September 12, 1878 – A tropical storm passes through the state, while offshore several vessels are wrecked.
- October 11, 1878 – A tropical storm brushes the coastline.
- October 23, 1878 – The Gale of 1878 moves ashore, producing winds of up to 100 mph (160 km/h) and causing mariner losses along the coast; at least four casualties are reported, and damage amounts to $200,000 (1878 USD, $4.3 million 2007 USD).
- August 18, 1879 – A major hurricane crosses the eastern portion of the state, with its accompanying high waves and tides destroying several wharves and bridges along the coastline; damage is greatest near Morehead City.

== 1880–1889 ==
- September 9, 1880 – The Outer Banks are struck by a minimal hurricane.
- August 28, 1881 – A moderate hurricane moves ashore near Savannah, Georgia, which produces gales in southern North Carolina.
- September 9, 1881 – Wilmington is struck by what is considered the most severe hurricane in over 40 years; strong winds from the storm wreck buildings and trees, and damage from the cyclone totals $100,000 (1881 USD, $2.1 million 2007 USD).
- September 11, 1882 – After making landfall on Florida as a major hurricane, a tropical storm passes through central North Carolina, causing gusty winds near the coastline and widespread damage.
- September 22, 1882 – A tropical storm crosses the Outer Banks and drops locally heavy rainfall.
- October 12, 1882 – Paralleling the coastline a short distance offshore, a hurricane brushes the state with gusty winds and moderate rainfall.
- September 11, 1883 – A hurricane moves ashore just east of the South Carolina/North Carolina border, causing strong winds and wrecking several vessels along the coastline; there are 53 deaths in the state.
- August 25, 1885 – A hurricane crosses through the southeastern portion of the state with peak wind gusts estimated at over 125 mph (200 km/h) in Smithville; there, damage amounts to over $100,000 (1885 USD, $2.3 million 2007 USD).
- September 22, 1885 – A tropical storm brushes the coastline.
- October 2, 1885 – The Outer Banks are brushed by a hurricane.
- October 13, 1885 – A tropical storm crosses the central portion of the state, which causes gales and high tides along the coastline.
- June 22, 1886 – Heavy precipitation and unsettled conditions are associated with a tropical storm passing through the state.
- July 1, 1886 – Similar to the previous storm, a tropical storm produces gusty winds and light rainfall while passing through the state.
- August 20, 1887 – A major hurricane parallels the coastline offshore, destroying several houses and wrecking several boats.
- August 24, 1887 – Just days after the previous storm, another major hurricane parallels the coastline, though information is scarce due to downed communications from the previous storm.
- October 20, 1887 – A tropical depression becomes extratropical over the state, and causes light damage.
- October 31, 1887 – An offshore tropical storm downs telegraph lines in the Outer Banks.
- September 10, 1888 – A tropical storm crosses the central portion of the state.
- October 11, 1888 – The Outer Banks are hit by a tropical storm.
- November 25, 1888 – A moderate hurricane passes to the east of the state, bringing high tides and destructive winds.
- June 18, 1889 – A tropical storm brushes the coastline.
- September 12, 1889 – A tropical storm dissipates northeast of Virginia after persisting offshore for several days; the storm causes high tides, and a new inlet is cut through Nags Head.
- September 24, 1889 – Crossing through the central portion of the state, a tropical storm produces gusty winds and rough seas.

== 1890–1899 ==
Track map of 1899 Hurricane San Ciriaco

- October 11, 1891 – The extratropical remnants of a tropical storm produces gales along the coastline.
- June 16, 1893 – While crossing the state, a tropical storm drops heavy rainfall along the coastline.
- August 20, 1893 – An offshore hurricane brings heavy rainfall to the coastline.
- August 23, 1893 – The Outer Banks are brushed by a hurricane.
- August 28, 1893 – The Sea Islands hurricane moves ashore near the Georgia/South Carolina border as a major hurricane and later crosses through central North Carolina; it produces strong winds near the coast, which wreck a number of ships, while further inland the storm drops heavy rainfall. The hurricane damages or destroys hundreds of buildings, and kills one person near Kernersville.
- October 4, 1893 – The remnants of what was once the Cheniere Caminada hurricane pass through the state as a tropical storm.
- October 13, 1893 – A major hurricane moves ashore near the South Carolina/North Carolina border, producing record high tides in Wilmington that causes heavy coastal damage; damage to the Wilmington waterfront totals $150,000 (1893 USD, $3.4 million 2007 USD). A total of 22 lives are lost in the state due to the hurricane.
- October 23, 1893 – A tropical storm brushes the Outer Banks.
- September 28, 1894 – Paralleling the coastline a short distance inland, a tropical storm wrecks several schooners near Cape Fear and Ocracoke.
- October 9, 1894 – A tropical storm crosses the eastern portion of the state.
- July 8, 1896 – The remnants of a tropical storm spawn several tornadoes in the state.
- September 8, 1896 – An offshore hurricane brushes the Outer Banks.
- September 29, 1896 – The Cedar Keys hurricane crosses the state, causing overall light damage.
- October 11, 1896 – An offshore hurricane brushes the Outer Banks.
- September 23, 1897 – Paralleling the coastline just offshore, a tropical storm produces gusty winds and high tides.
- October 20, 1897 – Light to moderate precipitation is reported in association with an offshore tropical storm.
- October 26, 1897 – After executing a counter-clockwise loop, a tropical storm hits the Outer Banks from the northeast before continuing southeastward; its effects are minimal.
- October 2, 1898 – A major hurricane that strikes Georgia, and produces heavy surf in along the Carolina coastline.
- August 18, 1899 – The San Ciriaco Hurricane moves slowly ashore along the Outer Banks, after previously causing extreme damage in Puerto Rico. Nearly all of Hatteras Island is covered with a 4-foot (1.2 m) storm tide, and about 10 vessels are wrecked. Damage is severe across the eastern portion of the state, and over 20 people are killed in the state.
- October 6, 1899 – The extratropical remnants of a tropical storm brush the state.
- October 31, 1899 – A moderate hurricane moves ashore just southwest of the South Carolina/North Carolina border, resulting in high tides and one ship wreck; one person is killed in association with the storm.

== Monthly statistics ==
Number of recorded storms affecting North Carolina
Month	Number of storms
June	8
July	6
August	41
September	46
October	36
November	2

== Deadly storms ==
The table lists hurricanes by death tolls; hurricanes that caused an unknown number of deaths are excluded.

Name	Year	Number of deaths
Unnamed	1857	424
"Independence"	1775	163
"Racer's Storm"	1837	90
Unnamed	1883	53
Unnamed	1772	50
"San Ciriaco"	1899	20+
Unnamed	1842	8
"Expedition"	1861	7
Unnamed	1815	4
Unnamed	1878	4
Unnamed	1827	2
Unnamed	1876	2
Unnamed	1899	1

== See also ==
- List of North Carolina hurricanes
- Geography of North Carolina
