= 1815 North Carolina hurricane =

Atlantic hurricane in 1815

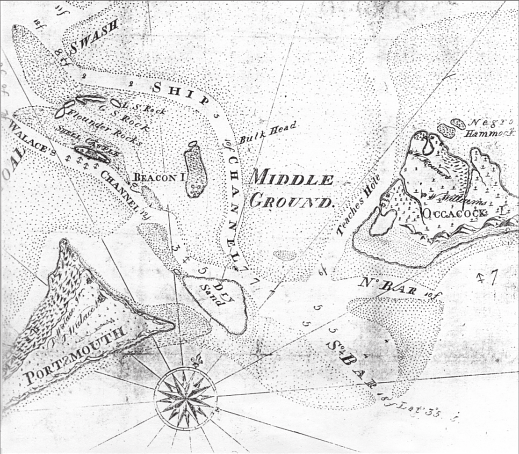
- A map of Ocracoke Inlet 20 years prior to the hurricane

Meteorological history
- Formed: August 26, 1815
- Dissipated: September 6, 1815

Overall effects
- Fatalities: At least 15 total
- Damage: $60,000 (1815 USD)
- Areas affected: Caribbean Sea, Georgia, the Carolinas, Virginia, New England
- Part of the 1815 Atlantic hurricane season

The 1815 North Carolina hurricane caused the most severe flooding in New Bern, North Carolina since 1795. First detected east of the Lesser Antilles on 26 August, the disturbance drifted toward the northwestern Leeward Islands, arriving by 29 August. The hurricane soon approached Charleston, South Carolina, on 1 September, and subsequently made landfall near Cape Lookout in North Carolina on 3 September. The gale reached New England by 5 September, departing the region on 6 September. The hurricane caused significant impact even before coming ashore: many vessels were damaged, grounded, capsized, or destroyed offshore throughout the course of the storm. Extensive damage to corn, cotton, and rice crops was also noted. Flood waters brought rivers as much as 8 ft (2.4 m) above normal, inundating streets and structures. Overall, the hurricane inflicted at least 15 deaths throughout its existence, (Note: Deaths are totaled as follows: Five individuals drowned at a residence near Swansboro, North Carolina, another four died nearby, and six were knocked overboard on the Julia.) and more than $60,000 (1815 USD) in property damage. (Note: All damage figures in the article are in 1815 United States dollars (USD) unless otherwise stated.)

== Meteorological history ==
The 1815 North Carolina hurricane was first detected far east of the Lesser Antilles on 26 August. The disturbance was next sighted at Saint Barthélemy on 29 August, where it produced severe winds. Eventually, it approached Charleston, South Carolina by 1 September, before making landfall near Cape Lookout, North Carolina on 3 September, where the hurricane's effects lasted for three days. The storm then swept inland, curving east of Wilmington and nearing New Bern soon thereafter. The hurricane subsequently veered northeastward at Edenton, its deviation in track coinciding with a shift in winds toward the northeast west of the system's trajectory. Tracking northeast, the system entered the Chesapeake Bay and passed into the open waters of the Atlantic Ocean after transiting over Norfolk, Virginia on 5 September, and continued to parallel the East Coast of the United States. Gales were observed on Long Island and in portions of New England, with heavy rain and strong winds noted. The disturbance remained offshore, however, and the system eventually departed the region on the morning of 6 September.

== Impact ==
Maritime losses as a result of the hurricane were considerable. On the evening of 31 August, the 140-ton British vessel Spring, which originated from Liverpool, was beached near Cape Romain within the vicinity of the Raccoon Keys. Massive waves caused the boat to disintegrate, and the crew fled on a longboat toward Charleston, South Carolina, surviving but losing the ship's cargo. The craft Brutus, meanwhile, overturned while en route toward Charleston from New York City, suffering the loss of its rigging and main boom. Despite experiencing damage to its cargo of cheese and potatoes, the ship arrived in Charleston safely. Meanwhile, off of Savannah, Georgia, the storm dismasted the clipper Richmond Packet which was delivering Spanish wine. Along the coast of Charleston, high waves prevented ships from docking at port, and boats did not remain with their moorings, with one breaking free and washing aground at James Island. Moving up the coast, the storm leveled fields of cotton, pushed salt water upstream, and destroyed dams protecting rice fields on the Cooper River, destroying the year's harvest. An editor of the newspaper Savannah Republican composed a poem reflecting upon and lamenting the plight of seamen who died in the storm. At Sullivan's Island near Charleston, the hurricane beached several vessels, and from Charleston to Georgetown, intense gusts and copious rainfall ruined cotton and rice fields in low-lying regions.

The hurricane destroyed ships from Cape Fear to Currituck, North Carolina, ruined crops, uprooted forests, displaced gristmills, and demolished roads inland. At Wilmington, the storm inflicted damage to numerous buildings, among them the Cape Fear Bank, which suffered the loss of its chimneys. The city's wharves also experienced moderate damage, with a sloop from Bermuda capsizing and a brig separating from port, drifting toward a nearby plantation. A saltworks at Masonboro Island and several other offshore barrier islands endured severe damage, with the hurricane producing a 14 ft (4.3 m)-high storm surge in some regions, driving thousands of pounds of salt to sea. In all, the salterns at Masonboro Island suffered approximately $60,000 (1815 USD) in losses. Damage was similarly severe near Bear Island and locations along the White Oak River. At Swansboro, meanwhile, two schooners struck a sand bar and another two were grounded nearby, and three other vessels later washed into a nearby forest. A second saltworks was obliterated, and on a nearby beach, a residence was destroyed, with five family members drowned. A second house was also swept away, with four individuals inside killed. Majestic shade trees throughout the state were uprooted, and doors of houses near Cape Lookout burst open despite being firmly locked shut. At Edenton, the hurricane was believed to have been worse than the 1806 Great Coastal hurricane. Winds uprooted numerous trees at Fayetteville, obstructing roads, with similar impacts at Raleigh. Significant crop damage was also noted at Winston-Salem, where fences were toppled, and fields of corn, orchards, and forests ruined.

The remnants of a small unidentified vessel were discovered, abandoned, near the origin of the New River, likely delivering cheese from New England. At Beaufort on the Outer Banks, several structures along the shoreline experienced damage, and several under construction ships were wrecked. Nearby at the Shackleford and Bogue Banks, several watercraft were destroyed. On the eastern sector of the latter, Fort Hampton was nearly washed away by the high storm surge generated by the hurricane. The barracks of the fort were lifted afloat for some time, with survivors clinging to its roof. To the north, another 30 boats were found destroyed near Ocracoke. Six men were killed after being knocked overboard upon the Julia, which was washed aground between Hatteras and Ocracoke. Additionally, a number of vessels were grounded near Cape Hatteras. Inland, thousands of trees and many structures were toppled, and fields of crops were flooded, disrupting the impending harvests. New Bern suffered especially acutely, with the waters of the Neuse River breaking their banks and inundating the town with 6 ft (1.8 m) of water; there, the flood was considered to be the worst since 1795. Buildings disintegrated under the force of high winds and flood waters, and many people attempted to escape their residences. Meanwhile, at Washington, the storm caused the neighboring Pamlico River to rise at a speed of 15 in (38 cm) per hour before peaking at a height 8 ft (2.4 m) above normal. Massive amounts of lumber and naval goods were swept away by the high waters, and numerous ships broke free of their moorings, of which two were beached.

Four British ships were forced to dock at Norfolk, Virginia after experiencing damage on 5 September, and at Long Island, similarly severe gales were endured by ships at Long Island. Heavy rain occurred in sections of New England on 5 and 6 September, though no significant damage occurred.

== See also ==
- 1815 New England hurricane
- 1827 North Carolina hurricane
- List of North Carolina hurricanes (pre-1900)
- List of New England hurricanes

== Notes ==
=== References ===
- Chenoweth, Michael (2006). "A Reassessment of Historical Atlantic Basin Tropical Cyclone Activity, 1700–1855" (PDF). Climatic Change. 76 (1–2): 169–240. Bibcode:2006ClCh...76..169C. CiteSeerX 10.1.1.693.8761. doi:10.1007/s10584-005-9005-2. S2CID 154932650.
- Fraser, Walter J. Jr. (2009). Lowcountry Hurricanes. Athens, Georgia: University of Georgia Press. ISBN 978-0-8203-2866-9.
- Hairr, John (2008). The Great Hurricanes of North Carolina. Charleston, South Carolina: The History Press. ISBN 978-1-59629-391-5.
- Ludlum, David McWilliams (1963). Early American hurricanes, 1492–1870. Boston, Massachusetts: American Meteorological Society. ISBN 978-0-933876-16-3.
