= 1827 North Carolina hurricane =

Category 4 Atlantic hurricane in 1827

Meteorological history
- Formed: August 17, 1827
- Dissipated: August 28, 1827

Overall effects
- Fatalities: More than 6 total
- Areas affected: Caribbean Sea, Turks and Caicos Islands, The Bahamas, East Coast of the United States, Nova Scotia
- Part of the 1827 Atlantic hurricane season

The 1827 North Carolina hurricane caused severe impacts along its track through the northeastern Caribbean Sea and up the East Coast of the United States in late August 1827. First observed over the Leeward Islands on August 17, the storm continued northwest, passing over Puerto Rico and the northern coastline of Hispaniola. It moved through the Turks and Caicos Islands and then the Bahamas by August 21 and curved northward. Although there is some discrepancy in its track, the hurricane moved ashore somewhere along the North Carolina coastline on August 25, perhaps at Category 4 intensity on the modern-day Saffir–Simpson hurricane wind scale. The cyclone emerged back into the Atlantic Ocean around Norfolk, Virginia, and grazed the New England coastline before last being observed offshore Nova Scotia on August 28. Along its track, numerous vessels were damaged, capsized, or run aground. The combination of heavy rainfall and ferocious winds caused severe crop damage, damaged or destroyed structures, and snapped and uprooted trees. Overall, the storm was responsible for more than six deaths and at least two injuries. (Note: Known fatalities are: a 14-year-old boy was washed overboard the Brandt, the captain of the Solon died from fatigue, the captains of the Amphibious and Mary drowned, and the carpenter and ship's mate drowned after the Diamond Shoals lightship was destroyed. All passengers save the captain (who later died) and crew member were washed overboard the Solon, but an exact count is not available.)

== Meteorological synopsis ==
The origin of the 1827 North Carolina hurricane is unclear in the absence of reliable data across the Atlantic Ocean, but it is surmised the storm began as a classic Cape Verde hurricane. On a west-northwest track, the hurricane moved through the Lesser Antilles on August 17 and August 18, grazing the coastline of Hispaniola the following day. It reached the Turks and Caicos Islands on August 20 and the Bahamas on August 21, subsequently curving northward east of Florida and South Carolina a few days later. On August 25, the storm – thought to have been as strong as Category 4 strength on the modern-day Saffir–Simpson hurricane wind scale – moved ashore along the North Carolina coastline. Its exact landfall point remains unclear, with one study suggesting a landfall along the Outer Banks, and a second study concluding a landfall along the Carolinas border on the basis of surface observations from Wilmington, North Carolina. Nonetheless, the storm then turned northeast and emerged into the Atlantic around Norfolk, Virginia. It grazed the New England coastline before being last documented around Sable Island offshore Nova Scotia on August 28.

== Impact and aftermath ==
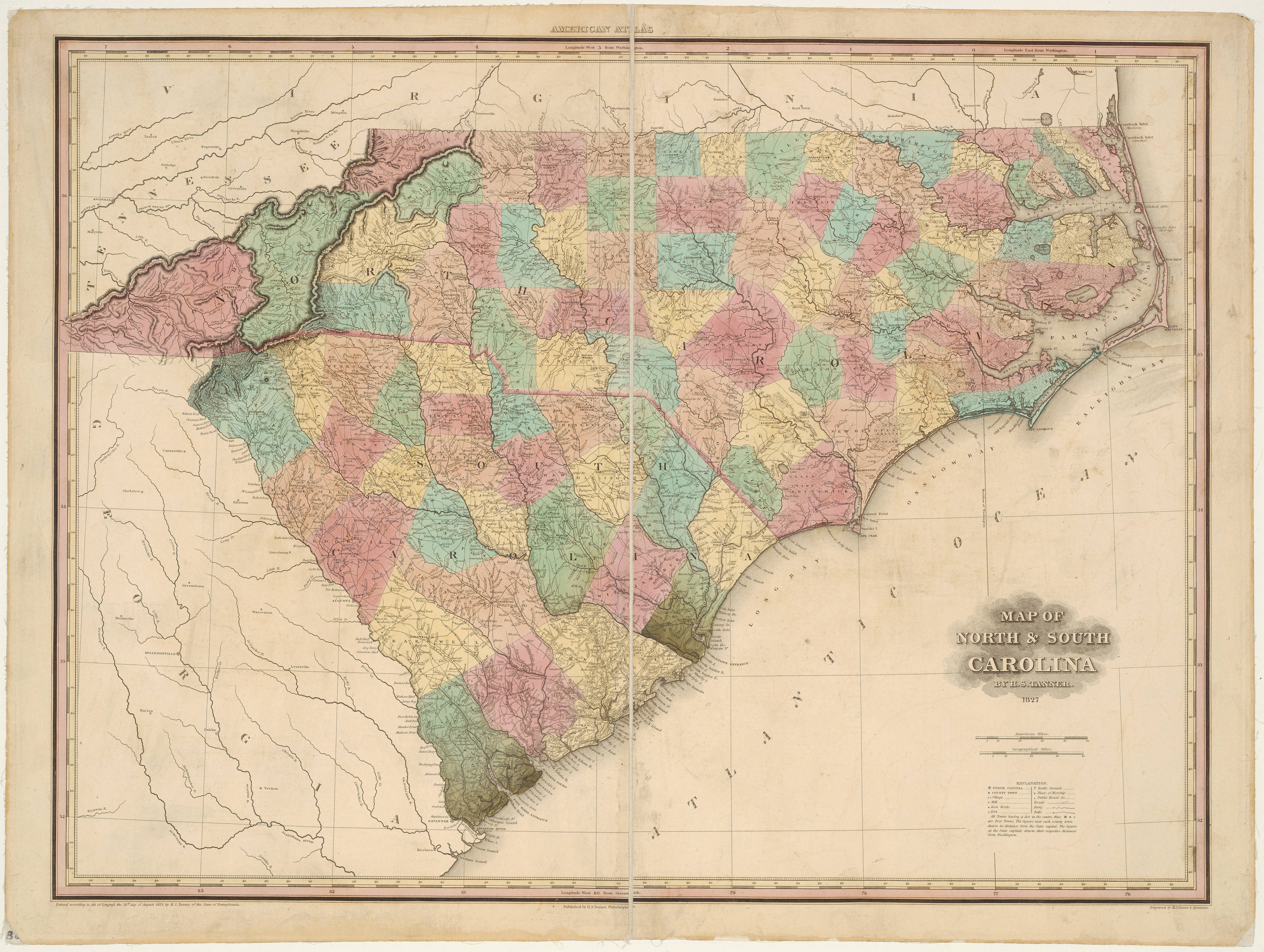
Map of the Carolinas in 1827

The 1827 hurricane first made its presence known in Antigua and Saint Croix on August 17, where on the latter island the wind was regarded as "the worst in forty years" and continued for up to ten hours. In nearby Saint Kitts, the storm was considered the most violent in half a century. Puerto Rico bore the brunt of the cyclone on August 18, where severe crop damage was reported. Offshore the Southeastern United States, the ship Lavinia en route to New Orleans from New York City intercepted the powerful hurricane. A combination of high waves and strong winds caused severe damage to the vessel, and it was saved only by the storm's passage. Almost simultaneously, the ship Brandt from Charleston, South Carolina bound for New York encountered winds that "blew a perfect hurricane," with its sails torn apart and reduced to bare poles. Tumbled about by southwesterly winds and a strong current, the vessel soon found itself in 60 feet (18 m) waves, with up to 9 feet (2.7 m) of standing water in the hold. A 14-year-old boy was washed overboard. Aided by a French frigate, as well as a lessening of the tumultuous weather, the ship eventually found ground in Norfolk. In late August, passengers aboard the schooner Mary Ellen from Baltimore observed a second schooner partially disassembled. She soon also intercepted the system and was knocked on its side by a large wave. It was righted and continued on its course to Charleston, but not before sustaining substantial damage. Another schooner, the Solon from New Orleans, passed through the hurricane offshore the Georgia or South Carolina coastlines. Massive waves wrecked the ship, washing overboard all passengers except the captain and his crew member. Both men were rescued by the Mary Eleanor of Savannah, Georgia, but the captain died a day later from fatigue. Although the eye of the cyclone passed well east of Charleston, winds "blew with great violence" for six hours. Only minimal damage occurred in the city and surrounding areas as the storm passed by during low tide.

Throughout North Carolina, the 1827 hurricane was considered more severe than a similar-tracked cyclone that impacted the region 12 years prior. In the city of Wilmington, a few buildings saw their chimneys destroyed, roofs ripped off, and fences flattened. One resident recounted that waves washed above garden fences up to 1.3 miles (2.1 km) inland, while other reports suggested that storm tides surpassed 10 feet (3.0 m) above normal levels. Less than a dozen vessels were driven ashore along the banks of the Cape Fear River. Outside the city, the hurricane widened the Masonboro Sound by at least 0.5 miles (0.80 km) and destroyed several of the accompanied saltworks. Fayetteville recorded a 30-hour period of gales and rain, where an abundant corn crop sustained insignificant loss. The cotton and tobacco crops did not fare so well, and many roads were rendered impassible by fallen trees or high water. Raleigh, meanwhile, saw many of its water courses flooded, mills and bridges carried off, and trees and chimneys downed. Corn and cotton crops were in some cases torn to pieces, and piles of wheat which had been stacked in fields were swept downstream. In Bethabara, or modern-day Winston-Salem, the hurricane's onslaught downed fences, tore off roofs, and damaged orchards and forests. Several bridges were swept away by floodwaters, and numerous washed-out roadways impeded travel for weeks following the storm's passage. In Washington, floodwaters rose to as much as 6 feet (1.8 m) in the first floor of houses along Water Street, while storm tides exceeded 12–15 feet (3.7–4.6 m). One schooner was driven aground causing damage to a wharf while several others combined to dislodge and carry away a bridge. Most crops were destroyed. In nearby New Bern, residents were forced to navigate the city by canoe.

Across Ocracoke, five out of the six vessels harbored in Wallace's Channel were driven aground, with the remaining craft being blown into the Pamlico Sound. Two packet boats from New York were pushed ashore and smashed to pieces. A newly placed lightship off Ocracoke Inlet broke loose and was pushed onto Ocracoke Island, where the captain, his wife, and their three daughters were rescued. At Cedar Hummock, a large ship en route from the Bay of Honduras to London ran aground during the height of the hurricane but was set back on its way after the storm passed. The ships Amphibious and Mary were both wrecked and pushed ashore near Portsmouth, and both captains drowned. The most well-known encounter with this hurricane came about 13.5 miles (21.7 km) offshore Cape Hatteras, where the Diamond Shoals lightship was positioned just four years prior. Rough seas created by the hurricane broke the ship from its moorings and drove it ashore on the Core Banks near Portsmouth, drowning the carpenter and the ship's mate in the process. No new lightship was replaced in this position for another half a century. Around the cape itself, only two out of twenty sails along Portsmouth Road were spared from running aground or being carried out to sea. Only one mill in 10 miles (16 km) remained standing after the hurricane's passage.

After departing North Carolina, the hurricane tracked through southern Virginia, where it was described as "a severe gale which continued for three days changed the climate here entirely ..." Thanks to a subsiding tide, damage along the coastline of Virginia was not nearly as severe as the 1821 Norfolk and Long Island hurricane, although winds were said to have been just as intense. Still, fodder was rendered useless, and many corn crops were damaged. A two-story building on Talbot Street in Norfolk had its second floor carried downwind, numerous cattle were swept away, and a mill dam was completely destroyed, with the bridge above it removed in the process. In Nansemond County, fruit trees were severely damaged. Along the James River, the low-grounds were completely submerged; crops along the waterway were also ruined. A brick building was destroyed, a team boat was sunk at its wharf, and some ships at the Navy Yard were ripped from their fasts but otherwise sustained no damage. The schooner Albion was gravely injured when nearly all of its sails were blown away, when it lost its main, jib-boom, and fore-top mast, and when all objects were swept off the ship's deck, including the caboose. Two crew members sustained injuries. Around Hampton, the pilot boats James Barron, Virginia and Mary Ann were both run aground. In Gloucester County, corn crops were damaged. The sloop Flag was capsized on the Middle Ground of the Chesapeake River with no survivors. The brig Liberty from Boston ran aground on the south side of Portsmouth, while the schooner Mulberry sustained severe damage; passengers overthrew cargo to prevent the ship from sinking. As far north as Baltimore, it is said "considerable mischief" was inflicted by the hurricane. In New York City, two vessels were pushed ashore while two pleasure boats were overturned along the East River. Heavy rainfall and gale-force winds were recorded throughout Connecticut, Massachusetts, and Cape Cod.

As president, John Quincy Adams had previously disallowed trade between the United States and West Indies during his tenure. However, following the passage of the 1827 hurricane, the politician allowed free trade for three months. Presidential candidate Andrew Jackson soon became outspoken against cutting ties between the two regions, and his support for free trade garnered support from shipping interests that helped him win the presidency a year later.

== Notes ==
=== References ===
- Barnes, Jay & Steve Lyons (2007). Florida's Hurricane History. Chapel Hill, North Carolina: The University of North Carolina Press. ISBN 978-0-8078-5809-7.
- Fraser, Walter J. Jr. (2009). Lowcountry Hurricanes. Athens, Georgia: University of Georgia Press. ISBN 978-0-8203-2866-9.
- Hairr, John (2008). The Great Hurricanes of North Carolina. Charleston, South Carolina: The History Press. ISBN 978-1-59629-391-5.
- Ludlum, David McWilliams (1963). Early American hurricanes, 1492–1870. Boston, Massachusetts: American Meteorological Society. ISBN 0-933876-16-5.
