= Borobia =

- Municipality
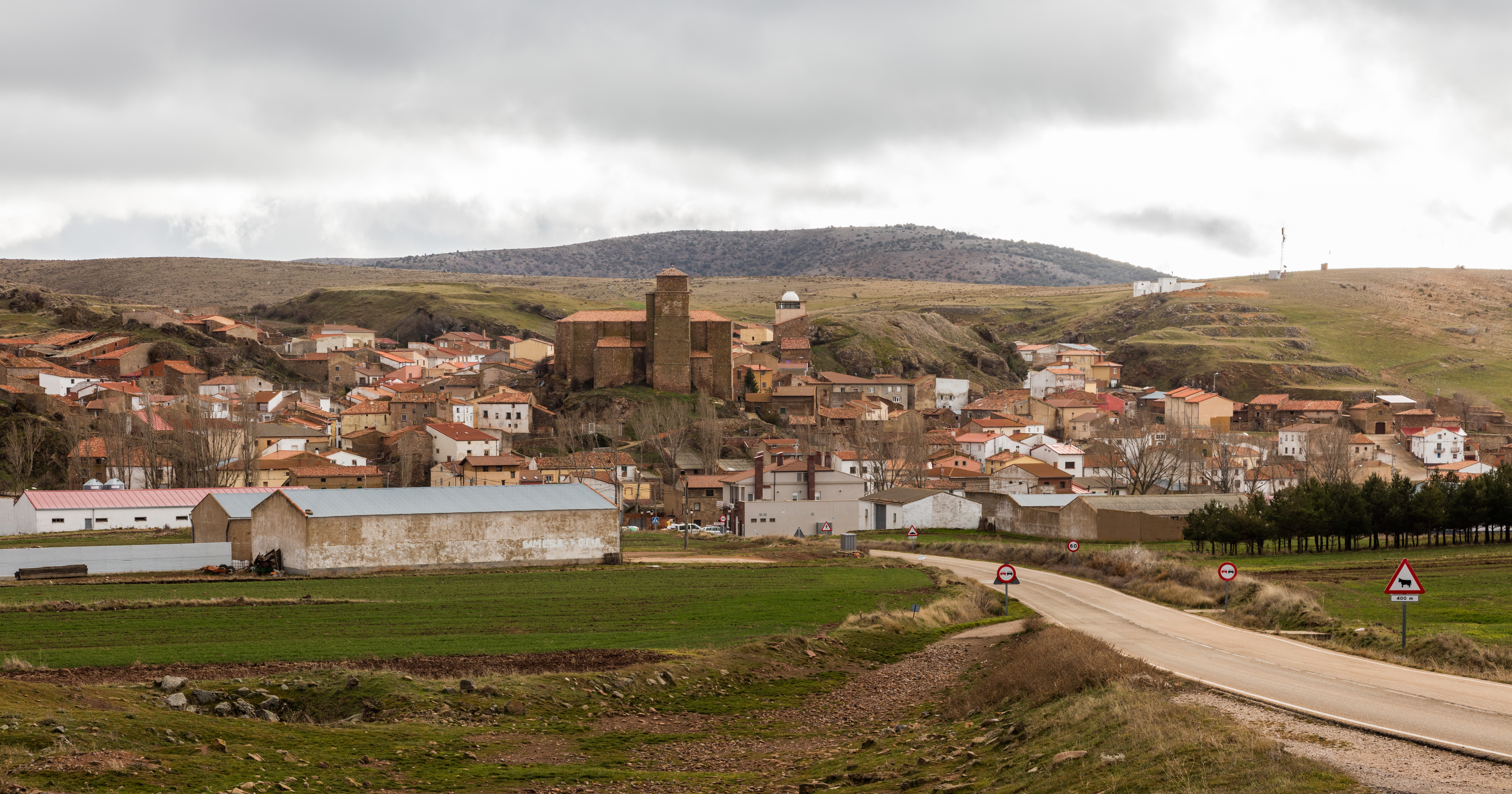
- View of Borobia, Soria, Spain

- Location in Spain. Borobia (Spain)
- Country: Spain
- Autonomous community: Castile and León
- Province: Soria
- Municipality: Borobia

Area
  - Total: 62 km^{2} (24 sq mi)

Population (2025-01-01)
  - Total: 218
  - Density: 3.5/km^{2} (9.1/sq mi)
- Time zone: UTC+1 (CET)
  - Summer (DST): UTC+2 (CEST)
- Website: Official website

Borobia is a municipality located in the province of Soria, Castile and León, Spain. According to the 2004 census (INE), the municipality had a population of 347 inhabitants.

It was the birthplace of conquistador Tristán de Luna y Arellano.

There is an astronomical observatory.
