= Ángel de Villafañe =

Spanish conquistador

Ángel de Villafañe (b. c. 1504) was a Spanish conquistador of Florida, Mexico, and Guatemala, and was an explorer, expedition leader, and ship captain (with Hernán Cortés), who worked with many 16th-century settlements and shipwrecks along the Gulf of Mexico.

== Life and work ==
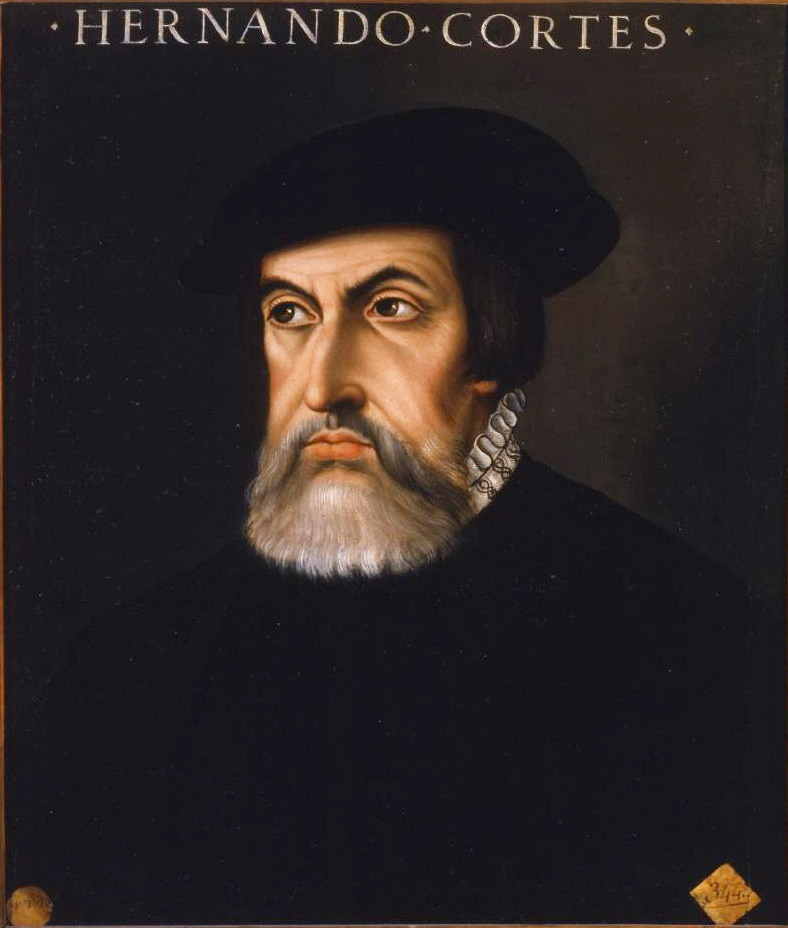
Hernán Cortés

Ángel de Villafañe was born about 1504, as the son of Juan de Villafañe and Catalina de Valdés, both natives of León, Castile (Spain), who had served Ferdinand and Isabella. In 1513, at age nine, young Angel accompanied his father in the fleet of Pedrarias Dávila to Darién.

In 1523, Villafañe went to Pánuco in the company of Francisco de Garay. With Garay thwarted in his plans to establish a colony by Hernán Cortés, Villafañe instead joined the Cortés faction and sailed to Mexico City.

In Mexico City, Angel de Villafañe married Doña Ynés de Caravajal, a relative of Pedro de Alvarado, the famous conquistador (second in command to Hernán Cortés and governor of Guatemala). Angel de Villafañe became known as "one of the principal caballeros" of that city, and both he and his wife were recognized as "gentle people, hidalgos, and of great fortune."

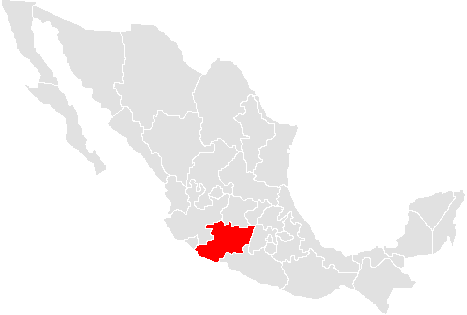
Michoacán (Mexico)

Villafañe participated in the conquest of Michoacán and Colima, and he also helped subdue the Chontal Mayas, the Zapotecs, and the Mixes. For his actions, he was awarded an encomienda at Xaltepec. He then participated in the pacification of Jaliscos and, as a ship captain, in Cortés's exploration of the Pacific coast.

In 1553, Villafañe became entangled in a political struggle, after acting on the viceroy's orders to arrest the king's inspector, Diego Ramírez. Caught between the viceroy and the royal audiencia, he sought to extricate himself by sending a letter to the Holy Roman Emperor Charles I of Spain.

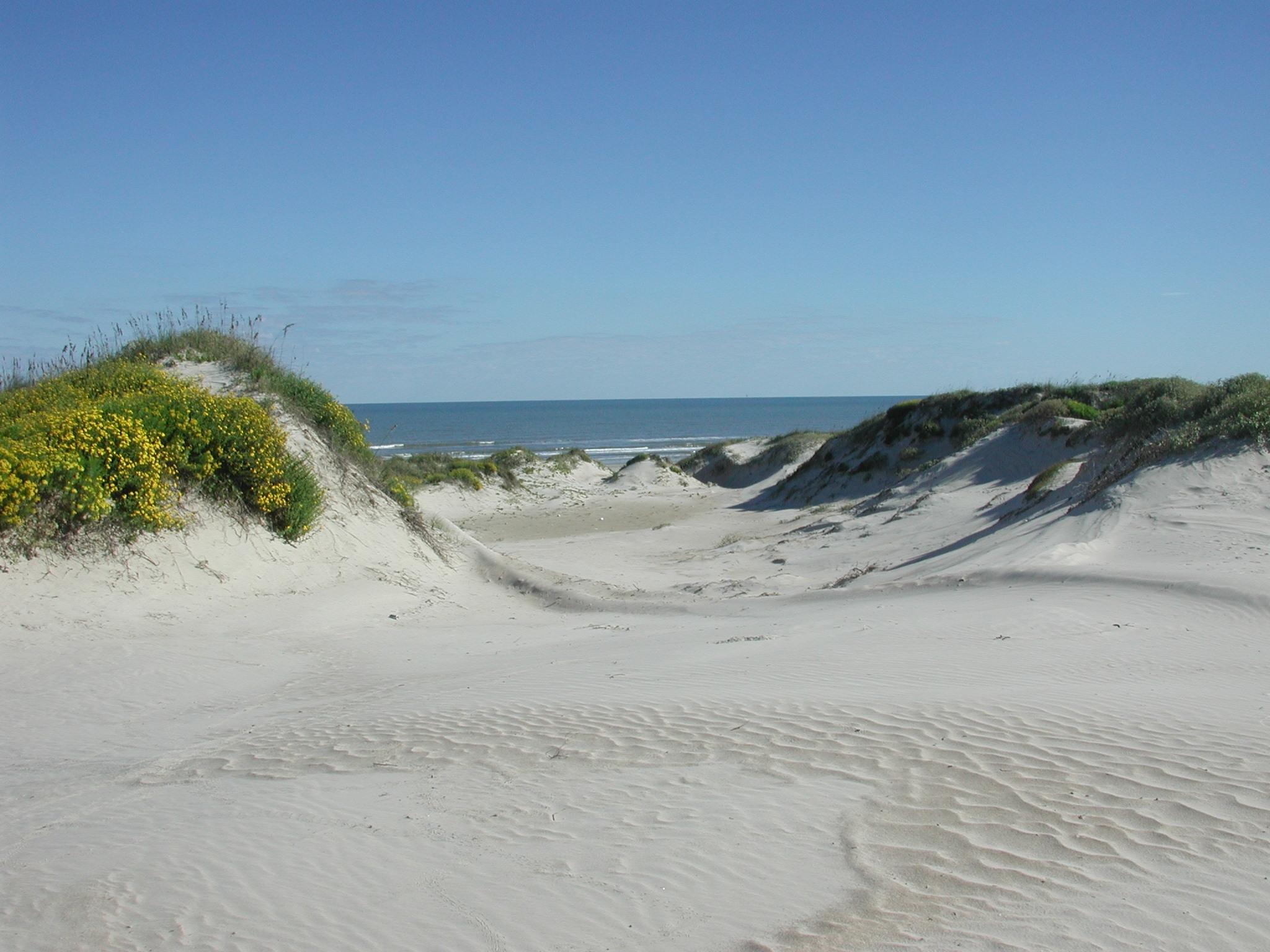
Padre Island dunes

His letter was transported in April 1554 on the ship San Andrés, the only ship of the four sailing at that time to make port. The other three ships were wrecked by a hurricane along the coast of Padre Island, in future Texas. In early June, when word of the disaster reached Mexico City, the viceroy requested a rescue fleet and immediately sent Villafañe marching overland to find the treasure-laden vessels.

Villafañe traveled to Pánuco and hired a ship to transport him to the site, which had already been visited from that community. He arrived in time to greet García de Escalante Alvarado (a nephew of Pedro de Alvarado), commander of the salvage operation, when Alvarado arrived by sea on July 22, 1554. The team labored until September 12 to salvage the Padre Island treasure.

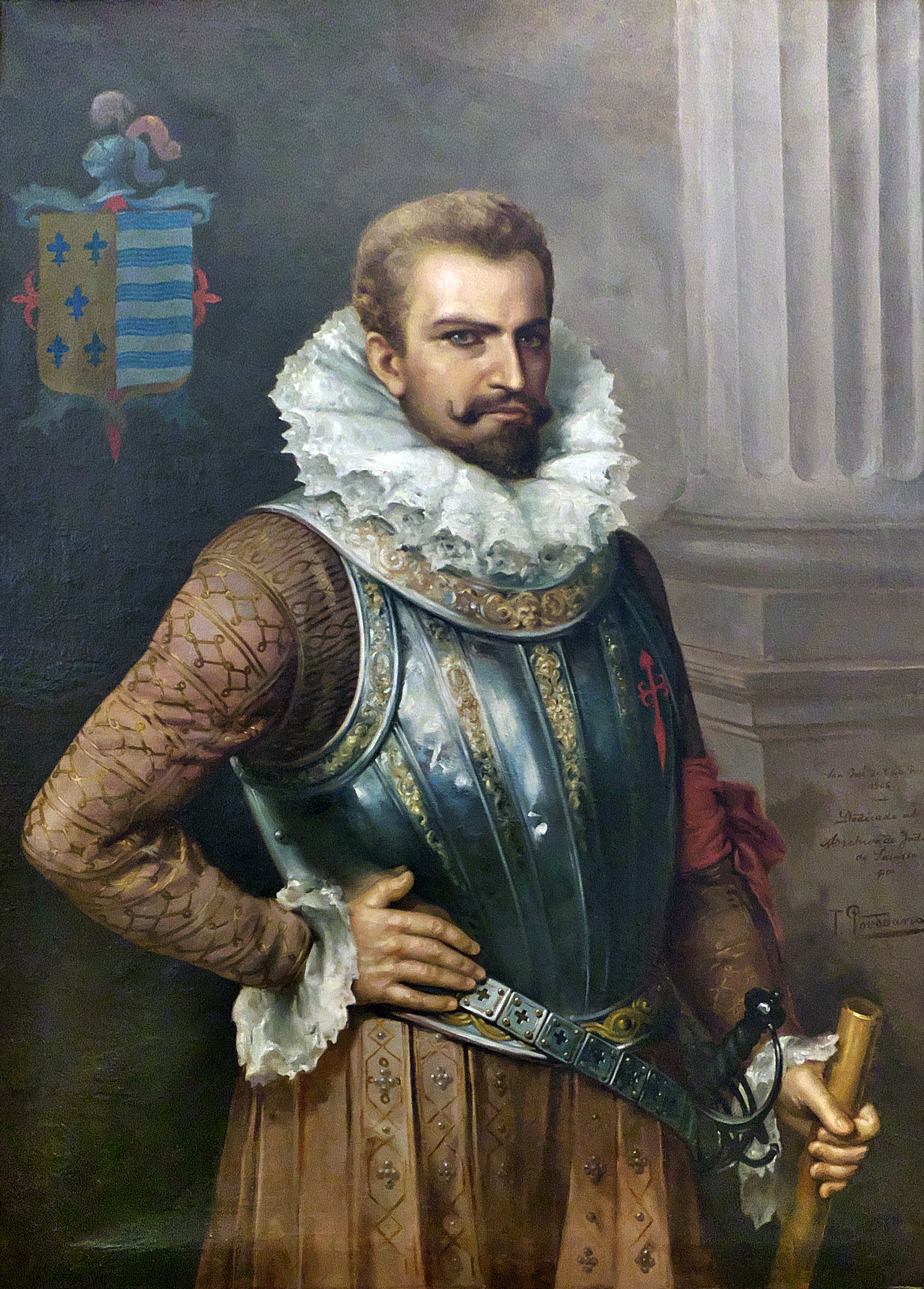
Don Pedro de Alvarado

This loss, in combination with other ship disasters around the Gulf of Mexico, gave rise to a plan for establishing a settlement on the northern Gulf Coast to protect shipping and more quickly rescue castaways. As a result, the expedition of Tristán de Luna y Arellano was sent and landed at Pensacola Bay on August 15, 1559.

Angel de Villafañe was involved in the Luna expedition from the start. Before it sailed, he took charge of the encampment at Jalapa, while Luna himself traveled to Veracruz to complete arrangements for the voyage. Afterward, commanding the San Juan de Ulúa garrison stationed at Veracruz, Villafañe was able to monitor the operation and report back to the viceroy, Luis de Velasco.

Over a year later, when Luna proved incapable of managing the settlements at Florida and Santa Elena, Viceroy Velasco then sent Villafañe to replace him. Tristán de Luna y Arellano had suffered disease, in trying to relocate the Ochuse settlement decimated by the hurricane of September 19, 1559, and most native food (corn, beans, pumpkins) was also depleted. Villafañe reached the Ochuse (Pensacola) settlement in early March 1561, and on April 9, he assumed authority as governor of both "provinces of La Florida and Punta de Santa Elena" in replacing Luna.

Leaving 50 men at Ochuse, Villafañe sailed the rest of the colony (about 230 persons) to Santa Elena (Georgia near South Carolina). After several landings along the Carolina coast, while seeking a suitable port, the fleet was struck by another hurricane, but some ships survived.

Villafañe sailed his storm-battered fleet to Hispaniola, and then to Havana, Cuba, where many of his soldiers scattered. After three months in Cuba, Villafañe returned to Ochuse (Pensacola Bay) to remove the remaining 50 men of the colony, sailing back to Mexico.

Along with other participants in the Florida / Santa Elena attempt, Villafañe was summoned by Viceroy Velasco to offer advice on future settlements. The conferees concluded a negative assessment of settlements on both the Gulf Coast and the Atlantic coast. Future efforts on the Atlantic seaboard were to be made from Spain, and no new colonial enterprise was undertaken on the northern Gulf shore until after the landing of René Robert Cavelier, Sieur de La Salle in Texas, more than a century later.

A record of Villafañe's death has not been found.

== See also ==
- History of Pensacola, Florida
