= Tristán de Luna y Arellano =

16th-century Spanish explorer and conquistador

Tristán de Luna
- Born: Tristán de Luna y Arellano; Borobia, Spain
- Died: September 16, 1573; New Spain
- Occupations: Explorer and conquistador

Tristán de Luna y Arellano (died September 16, 1573) was a Spanish explorer and conquistador of the 16th century.

== Personal life ==
Born in Borobia, Spain, to a noble family, he came to New Spain, and was sent on an expedition to colonize Florida in 1559. He was the cousin of the viceroy of New Spain, Antonio de Mendoza, and of Juana de Zúñiga, wife of Hernán Cortés. In August of that year, he established an ephemeral colony at modern-day Pensacola, the earliest multi-year European settlement in the continental United States.

== Luna Settlement in Pensacola Bay: Santa María de Ochuse ==
During his years in Mexico, Luna had served with Francisco Vásquez de Coronado on his expedition to the Seven Cities of Cíbola and crushed an Indian rebellion in Oaxaca. Luna was chosen by Luís de Velasco, Viceroy of New Spain (Mexico), to establish a settlement on the Gulf Coast of what is now the United States, and clear an overland trade route to Santa Elena (in what is now South Carolina), where another outpost would be founded. The bay known as "Filipina Bay" (modern Mobile Bay) had been recommended from the September 1558 voyage of Guido de Lavazaris, but Luna's fleet eventually chose "Ochuse Bay" (modern Pensacola Bay) for their settlement. Luna's fleet included eleven crewed ships and more than 1,500 soldiers and settlers, under six captains of cavalry and six of infantry. Luna, however, proved to be an ineffective leader, and the expedition was plagued by multiple disasters, before he was deposed and the remaining survivors of the colony were evacuated.

The party anchored in Pensacola Bay (known as "Ochuse" since the expeditions of Francisco Maldonado during the 1539–1543 expedition of Hernando de Soto) and set up the settlement called Santa María de Ochuse during late August and September 1559. Luna dispatched the factor Luis Daza with a galleon back to Vera Cruz to announce his safe arrival, and plan for resupplying the site. He fitted two other vessels to sail to Spain, awaiting the return of two exploring parties. With much of the colony's stores waiting on the ships, Luna sent several exploring parties inland to scout the area; they returned after three weeks having found only one Indian town. Before they could unload the vessels, on the night of September 19, 1559, a hurricane (with storm surge) swept through and destroyed most of the ships and cargo: five ships, a galleon and a bark, pushing one caravel and its cargo into a grove inland. With the colony in serious danger, most of the men traveled inland to the Alabama River to the village of Nanipacana (also rendered as Nanipacna, Ypacana, and Nypacana), which they had found abandoned; they named the town Santa Cruz de Nanipacana and settled in until the rest of the colony arrived. Back in Mexico, the Viceroy sent two relief ships in November, promising additional aid in the spring.

The relief got the colony through the winter, but the supplies expected in the spring had not arrived by September. In mid-February, Luna ordered most of the colonists to move inland to Nanipacana, where they remained through the end of June, 1560. Lack of food at Nanipacana ultimately spurred Luna to send a 200-man detachment upriver to the Coosa chiefdom (Coça) in Northwest Georgia, where they remained through November before returning to Pensacola Bay. Back at Ochuse on Pensacola Bay, in part as a result of increasing tensions between Luna and his remaining officers and men, the Viceroy finally replaced Luna with a new governor, Ángel de Villafañe, who arrived in Pensacola Bay in April 1561 and offered to take all who wished to leave on an expedition to Cuba and Santa Elena. Luna was granted permission to leave, taking a ship to Havana and ultimately Spain, though he ultimately spent the rest of his life in Mexico, where he died in 1573. The Luna settlement was occupied through August, 1561 by a detachment of fifty men under Captain Biedma, left there by Villafañe in case further orders arrived from Viceroy Velasco; after Villafañe picked them up and finally returned to Veracruz, the Pensacola area was not populated again by Europeans until 1698, when the Spanish founded Presidio Santa Maria de Galve on the modern Naval Air Station Pensacola.

The site of Luna's colony was thought to have been re-discovered by local historian Tom Garner in October 2015, but after being investigated by the University of West Florida archaeology program under archaeologist and principal investigator John Worth, it was determined that they had rediscovered an Indian mound that has first been discovered by Smithsonian Institution researchers in the 1880s.

UWF archaeologists identified a roughly 13–15 ha site as Tristán de Luna y Arellano's 1559–1561 settlement Santa María de Ochuse, making it the largest mid-16th-century Spanish site in the Southeast and the earliest multi-year European settlement in the entire United States.
