= Native American women in politics =

Native American women have played significant roles in politics, both within their tribal nations and in broader American political life. Their involvement spans from traditional governance systems to participation in local, state, and national levels of government in the United States. These contributions have been shaped by historical, cultural, and legal factors, particularly the intersection of Native sovereignty and U.S. political structures.

== History ==
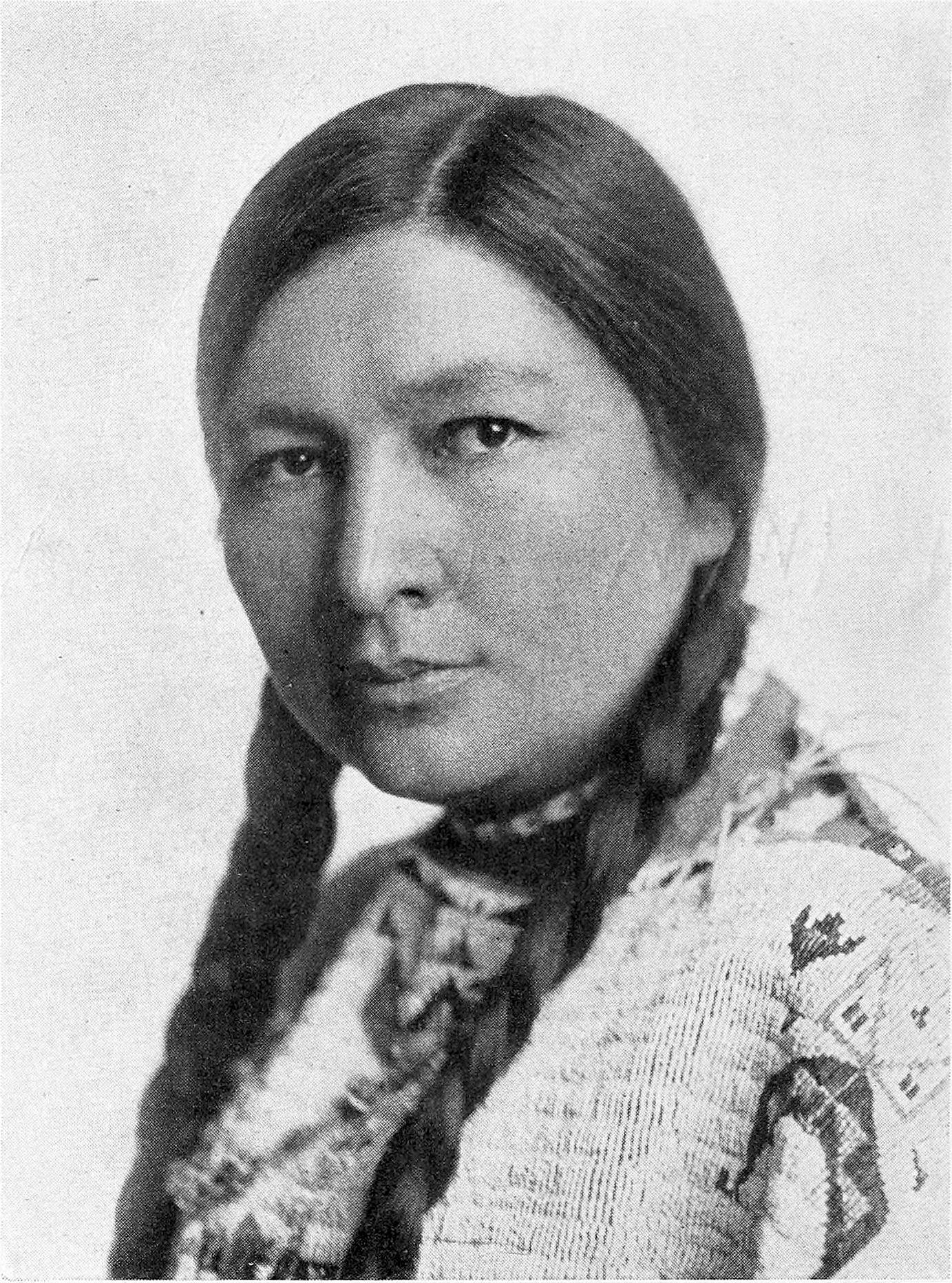
Zitkala-Ša c. 1921, co-founder of the National Council of American Indians

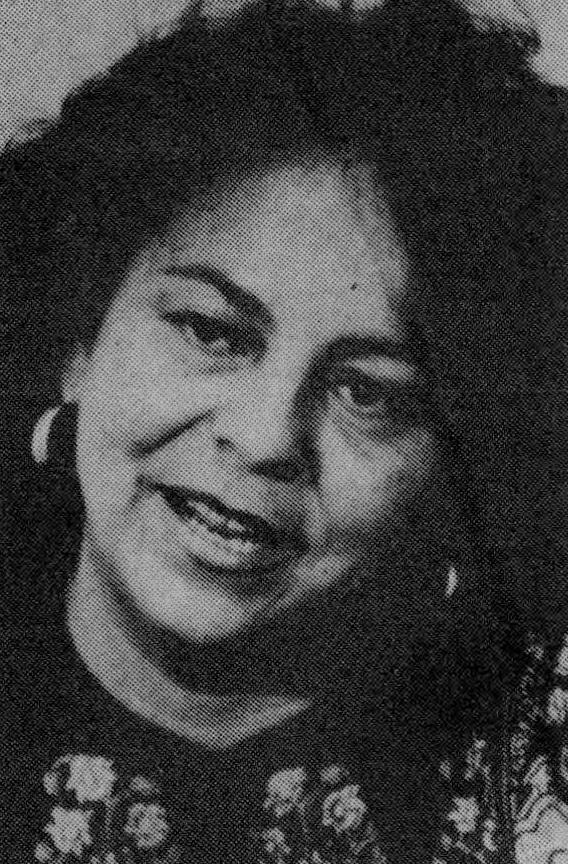
LaDonna Harris in 1980, founder of Americans for Indian Opportunity

Before European colonization of the United States, many Native American tribes practiced matriarchal or egalitarian governance systems where women held significant power in decision-making, clan leadership, and property rights. In several tribes, such as the Iroquois Confederacy, women played an influential role in political processes, including selecting leaders and making important tribal decisions.

The arrival of European settlers disrupted these traditional structures through colonization, forced assimilation policies, and the establishment of the U.S. government's legal frameworks, which often excluded Native women from formal political participation. Despite these challenges, Native American women continued to assert their influence within their communities and, over time, in the broader U.S. political system.

In the early 20th century, Native American women became active in advocating for civil rights, including citizenship and voting rights. The Indian Citizenship Act of 1924 granted U.S. citizenship to Native Americans, but many states continued to deny Native people, including women, the right to vote until after the passage of the Voting Rights Act of 1965. Native women like Zitkala-Ša pushed for greater rights. Zitkala-Ša, a Yankton Dakota Sioux writer and activist, co-founded the National Council of American Indians in 1926, where she advocated for Native sovereignty, education reform, and women's rights.

The mid-20th century saw a resurgence of Native American political activism, particularly during the American Indian Movement (AIM) of the 1960s and 1970s. Native women participated actively in these movements, calling attention to issues like treaty rights, land reclamation, and cultural preservation. During this era, Native women also began to take on more prominent roles in national politics. For example, LaDonna Harris, a Comanche activist, founded Americans for Indian Opportunity (AIO) in 1970, which focused on advancing the political, economic, and cultural rights of Indigenous peoples. Wilma Mankiller, a member of the Cherokee Nation, rose to national prominence as the first female chief of the Cherokee Nation, serving from 1985 to 1995. Mankiller's leadership focused on self-governance, community development, and improving the status of women within the tribe.

== Native American women in federal and state politics ==
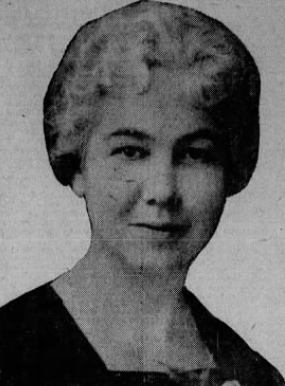
Cora Reynolds Anderson in 1924, first Native American woman state legislator

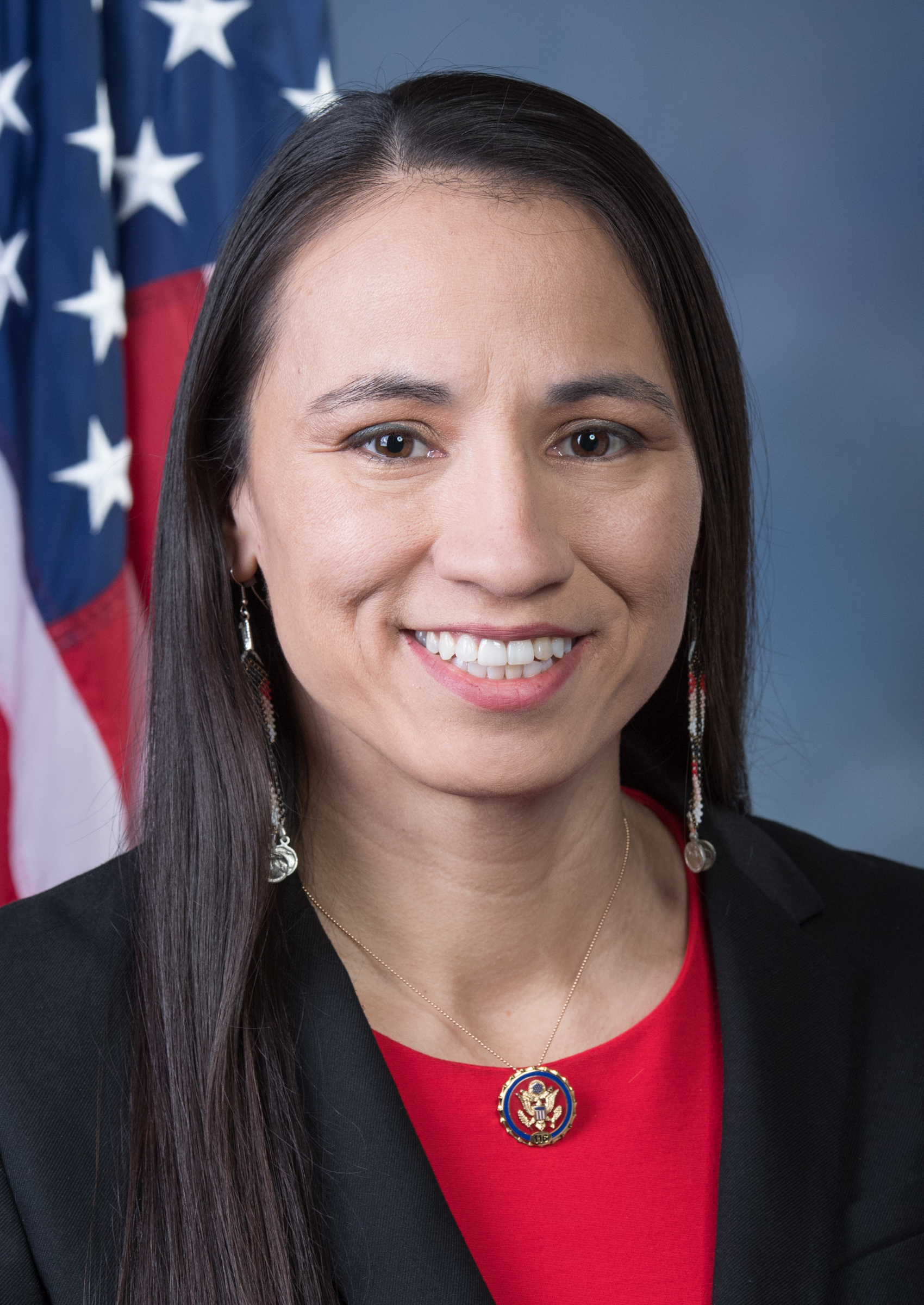
Sharice Davids, U.S. representative

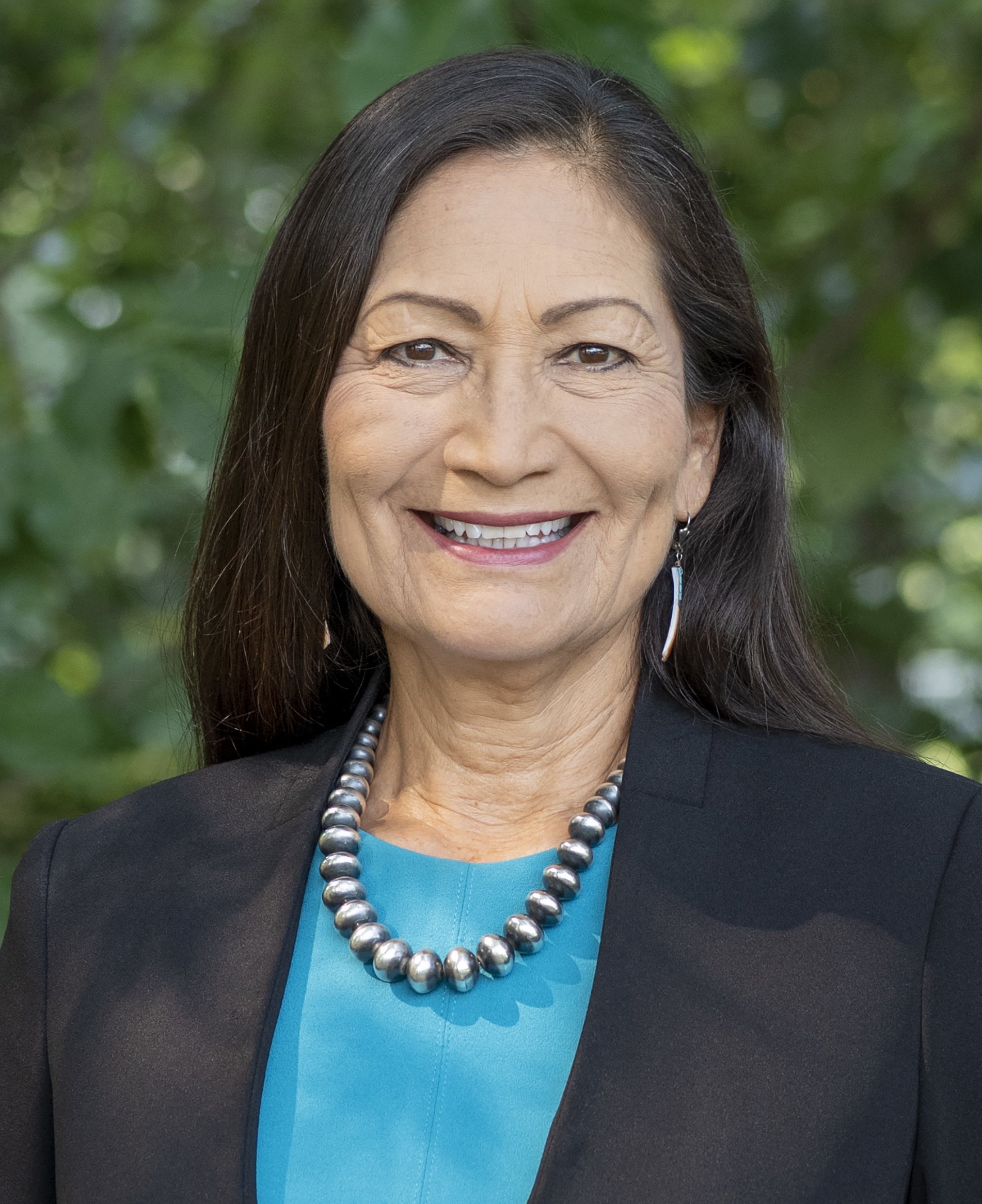
Deb Haaland, U.S. Secretary of the Interior

Native American women have increasingly held elected positions at the state and federal levels, representing a wide range of tribes and political perspectives. In 1924, Cora Reynolds Anderson became the first Native American woman to secure a seat in a state legislature. Sharice Davids, a member of the Ho-Chunk Nation, and Deb Haaland, a member of the Laguna Pueblo, made history in 2018 when they became the first Native American women elected to the U.S. Congress. Both Davids and Haaland emphasized issues of Native sovereignty, healthcare, and environmental protection during their campaigns.

In August 2019, principal chief Chuck Hoskin Jr. appointed Kimberly Teehee as the Cherokee Nation's first-ever delegate to the United States House of Representatives. In 2021, Victoria Holland was selected by the United Keetoowah Band of Cherokee Indians as a congressional delegate, arguing they hold the same rights as the Cherokee Nation and Eastern Band of Cherokee Indians to do so.

In 2021, Haaland became the first Native American to serve as a Cabinet secretary when she was appointed as the United States Secretary of the Interior by U.S. president Joe Biden. In this role, she has been responsible for managing public lands, overseeing relations with Native American tribes, and addressing environmental challenges such as climate change. In 2022, Mary Peltola became the first Alaska Native member of Congress.

At the state level, Native American women have also made significant strides. Denise Juneau, a member of the Mandan, Hidatsa, and Arikara Nation, served as the Superintendent of Public Instruction of the State of Montana and was the first Native American woman to win a statewide executive position. Her work focused on improving education for all Montanans, with a particular emphasis on Indigenous students.

== Contemporary activism and challenges ==
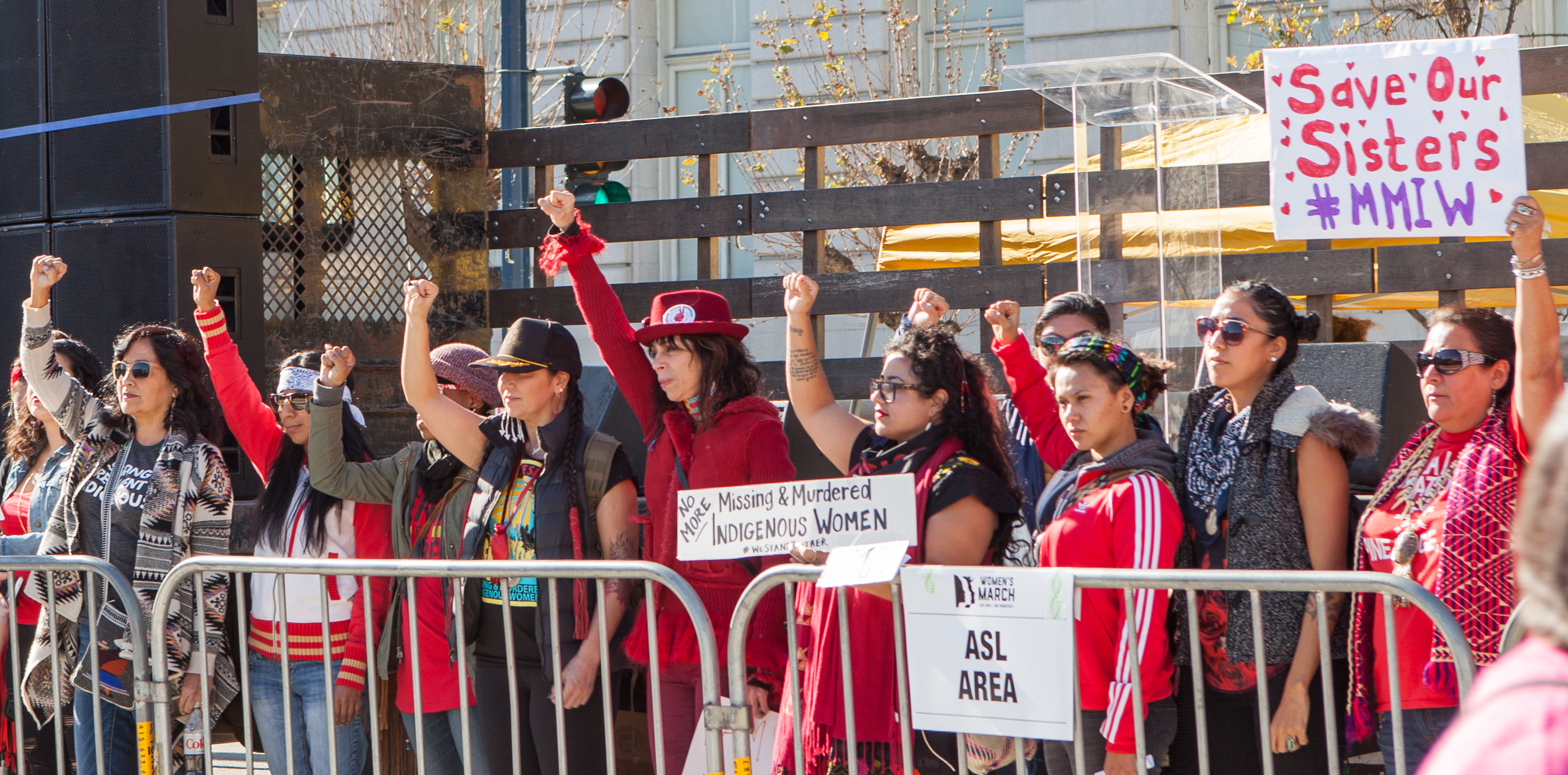
Activists for Missing and Murdered Indigenous Women (MMIW) at the 2018 Women's March in San Francisco

Native American women remain key figures in addressing a variety of political and social issues, including healthcare disparities, missing and murdered Indigenous women (MMIW), environmental protection, and tribal sovereignty. Many Native women politicians and activists continue to highlight the unique challenges facing Native communities, particularly those living in rural and remote areas. The MMIW movement has gained significant national attention, largely due to the efforts of Native women activists and lawmakers. The issue of violence against Native women, exacerbated by legal complexities involving jurisdiction on tribal lands, has led to calls for legal reforms and increased federal support.

Native American women face obstacles to political participation. Structural inequalities, including the underfunding of Native communities, lack of access to education, and geographic isolation, pose significant challenges. Native women often navigate complex dual political identities, balancing their roles within tribal governance systems and the broader U.S. political framework.

Furthermore, political representation for Native American women remains limited, with few holding elected office compared to other demographic groups. However, efforts to increase voter turnout in Native communities, improve representation in political bodies, and address the systemic barriers to participation are ongoing.

== Notable Native American women in politics ==
- Tina Abrams, first woman president of Seneca Nation of Indians
- Alberta Schenck Adams (1928–2009), Iñupiaq civil rights activist
- Cora Reynolds Anderson (1882–1950), first Native American woman to secure a seat in a state legislature
- Marge Anderson (1932–2013), first woman to lead the Mille Lacs Band of Ojibwe
- Anna Mae Aquash (1945–1976), Mi'qmaq Indians rights activist
- Awashonks (fl. mid- to late 17th c.), chief of the Sakonett tribe
- Emma Fielding Baker (1828–1916), president of the Mohegan Indian League
- Melanie Benjamin, chief executive of the Mille Lacs Band of Ojibwe
- Lyda Conley (1874–1946), Wyandot activist and first Native American woman admitted to argue a case before the U.S. Supreme Court
- Crystalyne Curley, first female speaker of the Navajo Nation Council
- Sharice Davids (born 1980), U.S. representative and member of the Ho-Chunk Nation
- Ada Deer (1935–2023), Menominee activist and the first Native American woman to head the Bureau of Indian Affairs
- Jackie Fielder, first Native American member of the San Francisco Board of Supervisors, member of the Mandan, Hidatsa, and Arikara Nation
- Peggy Flanagan (born 1979), U.S. senator-elect of Minnesota and lieutenant governor of Minnesota
- Deb Haaland (born 1960), U.S. Secretary of the Interior and former U.S. Representative
- LaDonna Harris (born 1931), Comanche activist and founder of Americans for Indian Opportunity
- Sarah Harris, vice chairwoman of the Mohegan Tribal Council and secretary of the United South and Eastern Tribes
- Yvette Herrell (born 1964), former U.S. representative
- Victoria Holland, Cherokee delegate-designate to the U.S. House of Representatives for United Keetoowah Band of Cherokee Indians
- Nellie Jimmie (born 1979), member-elect of Alaska House of Representatives, Yup'ik, Ojibwa, and Lakota
- Paulette Jordan (born 1979), first Native American woman nominee for governor in the U.S.
- Denise Juneau (born 1967), former Superintendent of Public Instruction of the State of Montana
- Lynn Malerba (born 1953), lifetime chief of the Mohegan Tribe and 45th treasurer of the United States
- Wilma Mankiller (1945–2010), first female chief of the Cherokee Nation
- Richelle Montoya, first female vice president of the Navajo Nation
- Harriet Wright O'Leary (1916–1999), first woman to serve on the tribal council of the Choctaw Nation of Oklahoma
- Mary Peltola (born 1973), U.S. representative, first Alaskan Native in Congress (Yup'ik)
- Kimberly Teehee (born 1968), first Cherokee Nation delegate-designate to the U.S. House of Representatives
- Zitkala-Sa (1876–1938), Yankton activist and co-founder of National Council of American Indians
- Melissa Tantaquidgeon Zobel (born 1960), Member of Mohegan Council of Elders and internally appointed as Vice-Chairwoman
