= Kimberly Teehee =

Cherokee political advisor from Oklahoma (born 1968)

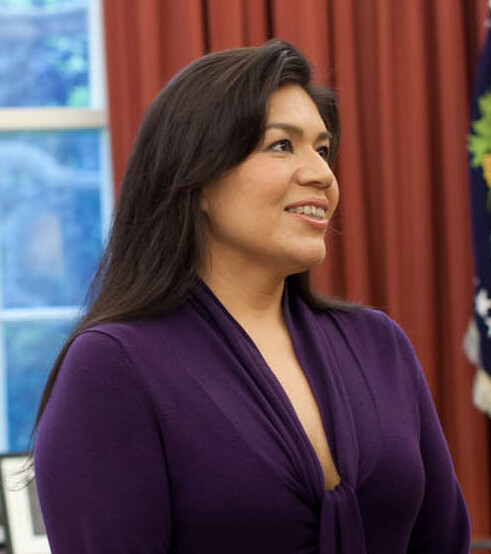
- Teehee in 2012

Delegate to the U.S. House of Representatives from the Cherokee Nation
- Not seated
- Assumed office August 29, 2019
- Preceded by: Constituency established

Personal details
- Born: October 13, 1968 (age 58) Chicago, Illinois, U.S.
- Party: Democratic
- Education: Rogers State University (AA); Northeastern State University (BA); University of Iowa (JD)

Kimberly Teehee (born October 13, 1968) is a Cherokee politician and activist on Native American issues. She is a Delegate-designate to the U.S. House of Representatives from the Cherokee Nation. She served as senior policy advisor for Native American affairs in the administration of President Barack Obama from 2009 to 2012. In February 2020, she was named by Time as one of 16 activists fighting for a "More Equal America."

== Early life and education ==
A member of the Cherokee Nation, she was born in Chicago, Illinois, and raised in Claremore, Oklahoma, by fluent Cherokee language speaking parents.

Teehee is a graduate of Rogers State University, where she received an associate's degree, and of Northeastern State University, where she was graduated cum laude with a Bachelor of Arts degree in political science in 1991. She earned her Juris Doctor from the University of Iowa College of Law in 1995. She was awarded a Bureau of National Affairs Award.

== Career ==
Teehee served as the first deputy director of Native American Outreach for the Democratic National Committee and director of Native American outreach for President Bill Clinton's 1997 inauguration. Starting in 1998, she then served as Senior Advisor to Democratic Congressman Dale Kildee of Michigan, who was a co-chair of the Native American Caucus in the House of Representatives.

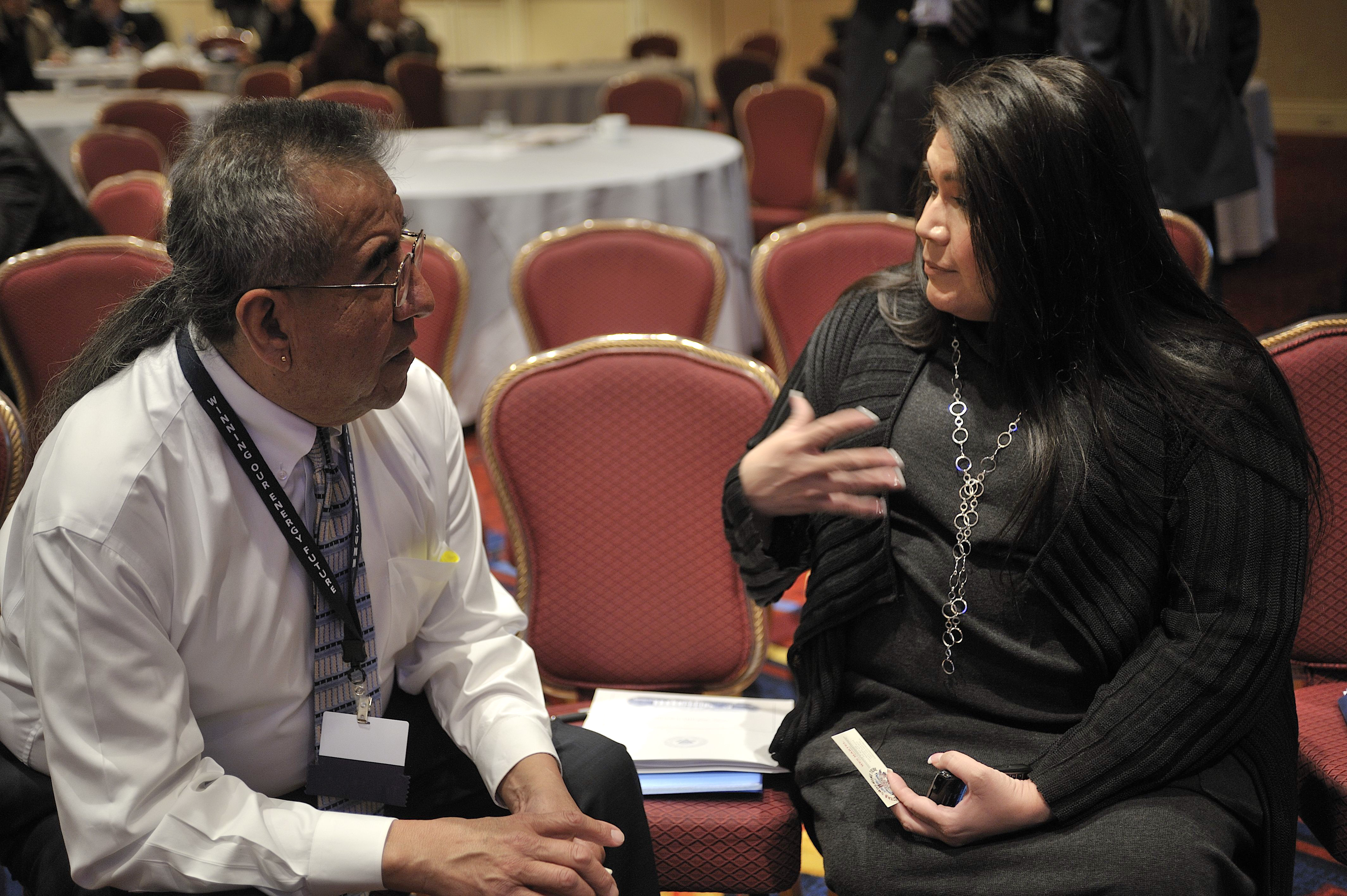
Tribal Energy Summit

In the Obama administration she served on the White House Domestic Policy Council. Beginning July 2009, she assumed the new position of Senior Policy Advisor for Native American Affairs and advised the president about issues pertaining to Indian country.

In 2012, she accepted "a position with the Mapetsi Policy Group, a small legal and lobbying firm founded by tribal advocate, Debbie Ho, with the aim of preserving tribal sovereignty."

During her tenure at the White House, she played a major role in securing re-authorization of the Violence Against Women Act (VAWA). In 2015, after leaving the White House, the Eastern Band of Cherokee Indians honored her for her work on VAWA, especially as it related to prosecuting non-natives who abuse native women on tribal lands.

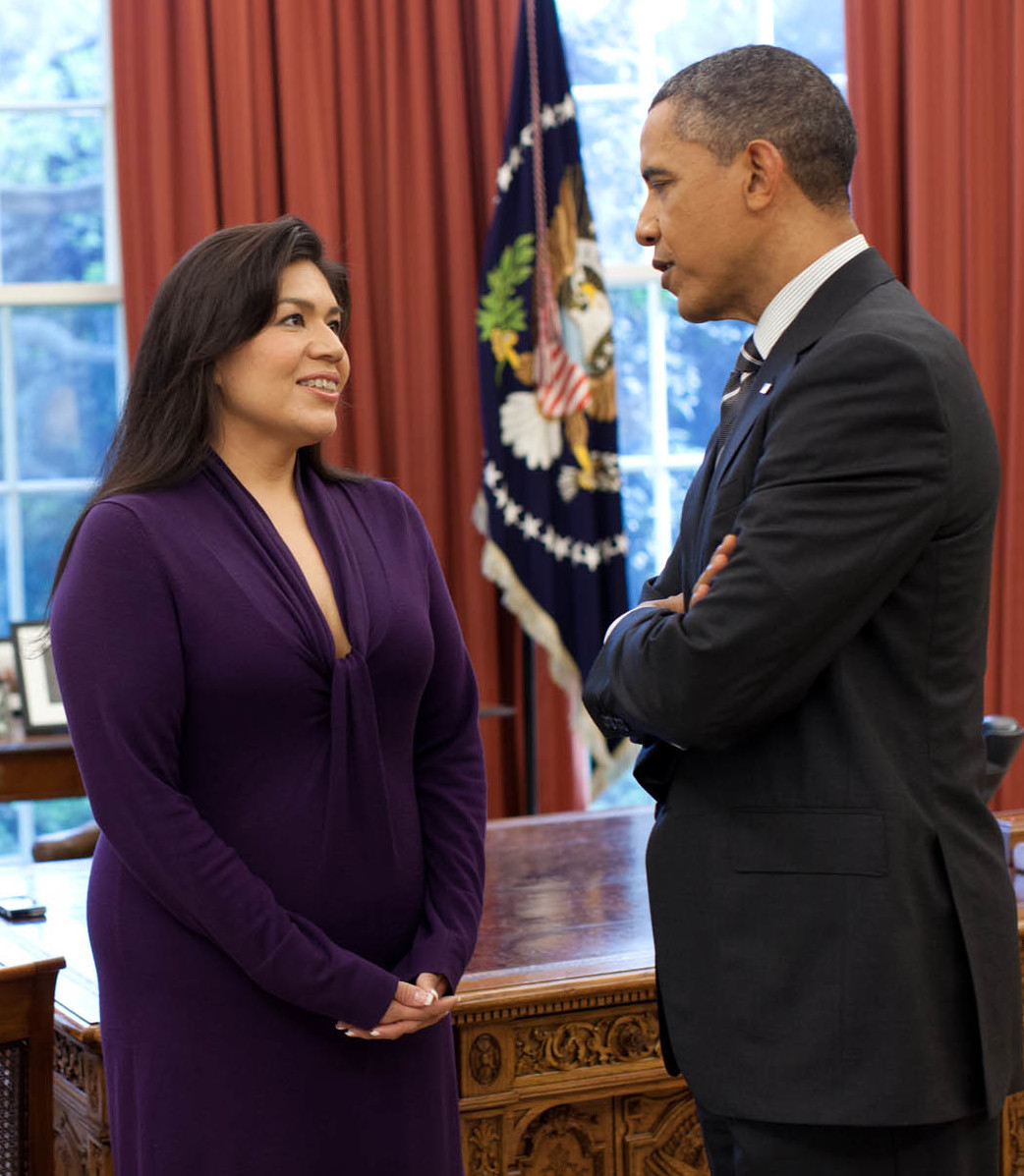
Teehee in the Oval Office with President Barack Obama in 2012

In 2014, Teehee joined Cherokee Nation Businesses, where she served as vice president of special projects for the tribe's holding company.

=== Delegate-nominee to Congress ===
In August 2019, Principal Chief Chuck Hoskin Jr. appointed Teehee as the Cherokee Nation's first-ever delegate to the United States House of Representatives. Her appointment was approved by the Cherokee Council on August 29. The Nation's right to send a delegate to Congress was provided for in the Treaty of Hopewell of 1785 and the Treaty of New Echota of 1835; however, the right was not exercised until 2019. The U.S. House of Representatives will have to vote to seat Teehee as a delegate similar to those representing the U.S. territories. If accepted, her role will be non-voting, similar to those of representatives from Washington D.C., Puerto Rico, American Samoa, Guam, Northern Mariana Islands, and the United States Virgin Islands.

The Cherokee Nation is still attempting to have Teehee seated. In February 2021, it was reported that Teehee was among those who advised President Joe Biden and Vice President Kamala Harris on their campaign promises concerning Native Americans prior to the 2020 United States presidential election and that her seating as a delegate in Congress had been delayed by the COVID-19 pandemic, though she expected to be seated sometime in 2021. Teehee remained unseated as of September 2022, when the Cherokee Nation government reiterated their insistence that Congress seat her. A formal hearing by the United States House Committee on Rules to discuss the legality and procedure for seating Teehee was scheduled for November 16, 2022. Hoskin spoke at the event and, afterwards, several members of the House supported a decision to seat Teehee as soon as possible, including by the end of the year, but Teehee was not seated by the end of the 117th Congress. Teehee was reappointed by Hoskin as the Cherokee Nation delegate-nominee in August 2023.

While Teehee represents the Cherokee Nation, in 2021, Oklahoma's United Keetoowah Band of Cherokee Indians selected Victoria Holland as a delegate, arguing that she represents the same people as the Cherokee of the Treaty of New Echota.

== See also ==
- List of Native Americans in the United States Congress
- Native American women in politics

U.S. House of Representatives
New constituency	Delegate-designate of the U.S. House of Representatives from the Cherokee Nation; 2019–present	Incumbent
