= Sarah Harris (politician) =

American and Mohegan attorney and politician

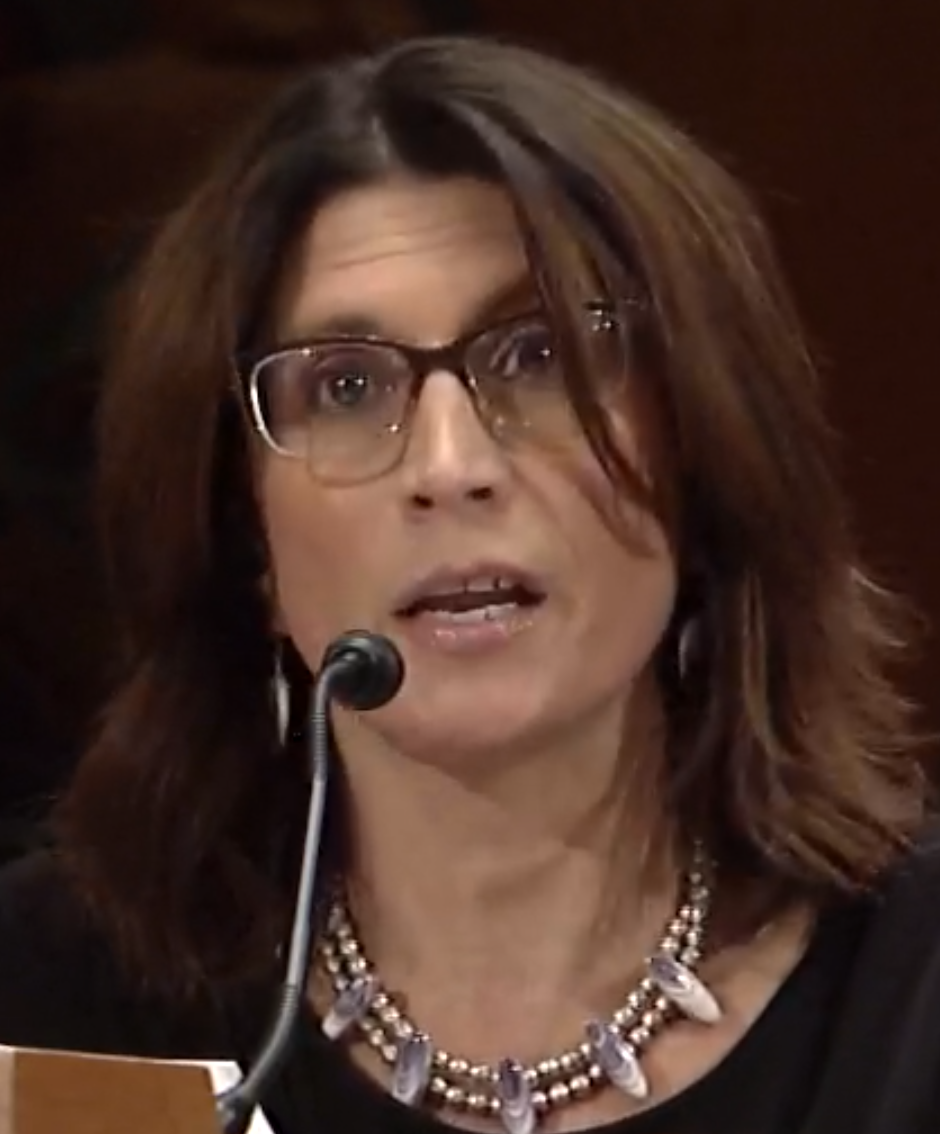
- Harris in 2025

Vice Chairwoman of the Mohegan Tribal Council
- Incumbent
- Assumed office October 2019

Member of the Mohegan Tribal Council
- Incumbent
- Assumed office August 2017

Personal details
- Born: Griswold, Connecticut, U.S.
- Citizenship: Mohegan Tribe; United States
- Children: 2
- Parent: Roland Harris
- Education: Dartmouth College; American University

Sarah E. Harris is an American and Mohegan attorney and politician who serves as the vice chairwoman of the Mohegan Tribal Council and the secretary of the United South and Eastern Tribes (USET). She previously worked in the Obama administration at the U.S. Department of the Interior, culminating in a 2013 appointment as chief of staff to the Assistant Secretary for Indian Affairs.

Harris graduated from Dartmouth College in 2000, becoming the first female Mohegan to do so. A descendant of Samson Occom, she led the effort that resulted in the 2022 repatriation of his papers from Dartmouth to the Mohegan Tribe. She was first elected to the Tribal Council in 2017 and has advocated for tribal sovereignty, including testifying before the U.S. Senate Committee on Indian Affairs regarding the federal government's trust and treaty obligations to tribal nations.

== Early life and education ==
Harris attended Griswold High School, where she was vice president of her senior class, a member of the National Honor Society, and participated in volleyball and track. During her final semester, she earned independent research credits by cataloging approximately 11,000 pages of documents related to the Mohegan Tribe's 1994 federal recognition.

At age 17, Harris was accepted to Dartmouth College through its early decision program, becoming the second known Mohegan to attend. In 2000, Harris became the first female Mohegan to graduate from Dartmouth, earning a B.A. in Native American studies. She later described her time at the college as a "mixed experience", expressing gratitude for her relationships but noting that her ancestor and college founder, Samson Occom, was "barely acknowledged."

Harris completed a J.D. at American University Washington College of Law in 2005.

== Career ==
Harris worked as an attorney in the Washington, D.C. area, representing Native American tribes, tribal entities, and tribal organizations.

In 2010, she left private practice to join the U.S. Department of the Interior as a special assistant to the solicitor. In this role, she worked with the U.S. Department of Justice to defend agency determinations and advance litigation for Tribal Nations. In 2013, Harris received a presidential appointment as chief of staff to the Assistant Secretary for Indian Affairs, an office then held by Kevin K. Washburn. As chief of staff, she managed approximately 8,000 staff members across the Bureau of Indian Affairs and the Bureau of Indian Education. She advised interior secretary Sally Jewell on Indian policy, collaborated with the White House on U.S. president Barack Obama's initiative to increase tribal trust lands, and worked on Indian Child Welfare Act regulations. Harris later described the work as rewarding, stating her belief that the Obama administration was the "most favorable administration in history to Indian Country." While at the department, she recused herself from matters directly involving the Mohegan Tribe.

After leaving the Department of the Interior in 2015, Harris returned to a law firm representing tribes and tribal organizations. In November 2016, the National Center for American Indian Enterprise Development named Harris one of its "Native American 40 Under 40." In late November 2016, Harris was one of 17 Native American appointees from the Obama administration to sign a letter urging the president to block or reroute the Dakota Access Pipeline.

After two unsuccessful campaigns for the Mohegan Tribal Council in 2007 and 2010, Harris was elected to the nine-member body in August 2017. She was elected vice chairwoman of the Tribal Council in October 2019. As of April 2025, she was serving her second four-year term. Harris was re-elected to the council for another four-year term commencing October 6, 2025.

In October 2025, Harris testified before the U.S. Senate Committee on Indian Affairs about the impact of the United States federal government shutdown. She reported that tribes were using their own revenues to subsidize federal benefits like WIC and Supplemental Nutrition Assistance Program and urged congress to make Indian program funding mandatory, stating, "Our funding is not discretionary, it is a debt prepaid with our lands and resources."

== Advocacy ==
Harris is a direct descendant of Sarah, the mother of 18th-century Mohegan minister Samson Occom. In 2020, she joined the Native American Visiting Committee at Dartmouth College, which advises the college president on Native American issues. In this role, Harris led an initiative to repatriate Occom's archival papers from the college to the Mohegan Tribe. The committee pitched the idea to Dartmouth's president, Philip J. Hanlon.

On April 28, 2022, Harris was a featured speaker at the repatriation ceremony where Dartmouth officially returned Occom's papers. At the event, Mohegan Tribal chairman James Gessner Jr. stated that the papers' return was a "direct result of Harris' involvement." In 2024, Harris was invited back to Dartmouth to speak at the inauguration of its new president.

Harris serves as the Secretary of the United South and Eastern Tribes (USET) and the USET Sovereignty Protection Fund. On April 7, 2025, she presented a talk at Quinnipiac University titled "We're All Part of This Story."

== Personal life ==
Harris is the daughter of Roland Harris, a former Mohegan Tribal Chairman and former Griswold first selectman. She is a native of Griswold, Connecticut. As of October 2017, Harris lived in Griswold with her 16-month-old twins, a boy and a girl.

== See also ==
- List of Native American politicians
- Native American women in politics
