= List of Native Americans in the United States Congress =

Map of all three congressional districts represented by Native Americans at the beginning of the 119th Congress. At the time, one of Oklahoma's two senators also was a Native American.

This is a list of Native Americans with documented tribal ancestry or affiliation who are in the United States Congress. All entries on this list are related to Native American tribes based in the continental United States. There are Native Hawaiians who have served in Congress, but they are not listed here because they are distinct from North American Natives.

Only two Native Americans served in the 115th Congress: Tom Cole (serving since 2003) and Markwayne Mullin (served from 2013 until 2023), both of whom are Republican Representatives from Oklahoma. On November 6, 2018, Democrats Sharice Davids of Kansas and Deb Haaland of New Mexico were elected to the U.S. House of Representatives, and the 116th Congress, which commenced on January 3, 2019, had four Native Americans. Davids and Haaland are the first two Native American women with documented tribal ancestry to serve in Congress. At the start of the 117th Congress on January 3, 2021, five Native Americans were serving in the House, the largest Native delegation in history: Cole, Mullin, Haaland and Davids were all reelected in 2020, with Republican Yvette Herrell of New Mexico elected for the first time in 2020. The number dropped back down to four on March 16, 2021 when Haaland resigned her House seat to become the first Native American Secretary of the Interior.

On August 16, 2022, Mary Peltola, a Yup'ik woman, was elected to the U.S. House of Representatives to represent Alaska, becoming the first person with documented Native Alaskan ancestry to serve in Congress. This returned the number of the Native delegation to five, with a partisan split of three Republicans and two Democrats. This also marked the first time that a Native American, Native Alaskan, and Native Hawaiian (Kai Kahele) simultaneously served in Congress.

Following the November 2022 elections, incumbents Cole (R-OK), Davids (D-KS) and Peltola (D-AK) all retained their seats, while Cherokee Republican Markwayne Mullin retired from the House and was elected to the Senate: Mullin became the first Native senator since the retirement of Ben Nighthorse Campbell (R-CO) in 2005, and his House seat was won by Choctaw Republican Josh Brecheen. In the same election, Yvette Herrell lost her seat due to redistricting, which drew litigation over alleged political gerrymandering; as such, Native Americans in the 118th Congress remained five, four in the House and one in the Senate. The partisan split is three Republicans and two Democrats. The states represented by Native members of Congress also dropped from four to three with Herrell's defeat in New Mexico.

Following the November 2024 elections, incumbents Brecheen (R-OK), Cole (R-OK), and Davids (D-KS) retained their seats, while Peltola (D-AK) lost re-election. As such, Native Americans in the 119th Congress went down to four, three in the House and one in the Senate. The partisan split is three Republicans and one Democrat.

== Senate ==
Entries shaded in blue denote incumbent U.S. senator.

| Name (lifespan) | Tribe | State | Party | Start | End | Notes |
|---|---|---|---|---|---|---|
| Charles Curtis (1860–1936) | Kaw Nation, Osage, Prairie Band Potawatomi | Kansas | Republican | January 29, 1907 | January 3, 1913 | Not reelected after 1912 |
| Charles Curtis (1860–1936) | Kaw Nation, Osage, Prairie Band Potawatomi | Kansas | Republican | March 4, 1915 | March 4, 1929 | Resigned after elected as U.S. Vice President |
| Robert Owen (1856–1947) | Cherokee Nation | Oklahoma | Democratic | December 11, 1907 | March 4, 1925 | Retired |
| Ben Nighthorse Campbell (1933–2025) | Northern Cheyenne | Colorado | Democratic (1993–1995) | January 3, 1993 | January 3, 2005 | Retired |
| Ben Nighthorse Campbell (1933–2025) | Northern Cheyenne | Colorado | Republican (1995–2005) | January 3, 1993 | January 3, 2005 | Retired |
| Markwayne Mullin (born 1977) | Cherokee Nation | Oklahoma | Republican | January 3, 2023 | March 24, 2026 | Resigned to become U.S. Secretary of Homeland Security |

=== Senators-elect ===
| Name (lifespan) | Ancestry | State | Party | Start | Notes |
|---|---|---|---|---|---|
| Peggy Flanagan (born 1979) | White Earth Ojibwe | Minnesota | Democratic (DFL) | January 3, 2027 | First Native American woman elected to the U.S. Senate |
| Mary Peltola (born 1973) | Orutsararmiut Yup'ik | Alaska | Democratic | January 3, 2027 | First Alaska Native elected to the U.S. Senate |

=== Histograph ===
The histograph below sets forth the number of Native Americans who served in the United States Senate during the periods provided.

| Starting | Total | Graph |
|---|---|---|
| February 23, 1870 | 1 | |
| March 4, 1871 | 0 | |
| January 29, 1907 | 1 | ❚ |
| December 11, 1907 | 2 | ❚❚ |
| January 3, 1913 | 1 | ❚ |
| March 4, 1915 | 2 | ❚❚ |
| March 4, 1925 | 1 | ❚ |
| March 4, 1929 | 0 | |
| January 3, 1993 | 1 | ❚ |
| January 3, 2005 | 0 | |
| January 3, 2023 | 1 | ❚ |
| March 24, 2026 | 0 | |

== House of Representatives ==
Entries shaded in blue denote incumbent U.S. representative.

| Name (lifespan) | Ancestry | State | Party | Start | End | Notes |
|---|---|---|---|---|---|---|
| Charles Curtis (1860–1936) | Kaw, Osage, Potawatomi | Kansas | Republican | March 4, 1893 | January 28, 1907 | Resigned to become U.S. Senator from Kansas |
| Charles Carter (1868–1929) | Chickasaw | Oklahoma | Democratic | November 16, 1907 | March 4, 1927 | Lost re-nomination |
| William Hastings (1866–1938) | Cherokee | Oklahoma | Democratic | March 4, 1915 | March 4, 1921 | Lost re-election |
| William Hastings (1866–1938) | Cherokee | Oklahoma | Democratic | March 4, 1923 | January 3, 1935 | Retired |
| Will Rogers Jr. (1911–1993) | Cherokee | California | Democratic | January 3, 1943 | May 23, 1944 | Resigned to join the U.S. Army |
| William Stigler (1891–1952) | Choctaw | Oklahoma | Democratic | March 28, 1944 | August 21, 1952 | Died in office |
| Ben Reifel (1906–1990) | Rosebud Lakota | South Dakota | Republican | January 3, 1961 | January 3, 1971 | Retired |
| Clem McSpadden (1925–2008) | Cherokee | Oklahoma | Democratic | January 3, 1973 | January 3, 1975 | Retired to run unsuccessfully for the nomination to the 1974 Oklahoma gubernatorial election |
| Ben Nighthorse Campbell (1933–2025) | Northern Cheyenne | Colorado | Democratic | January 3, 1987 | January 3, 1993 | Retired to run successfully for the 1992 United States Senate election in Colorado |
| Brad Carson (born 1967) | Cherokee | Oklahoma | Democratic | January 3, 2001 | January 3, 2005 | Retired to run unsuccessfully for the 2004 United States Senate election in Oklahoma |
| Tom Cole (born 1949) | Chickasaw | Oklahoma | Republican | January 3, 2003 | Incumbent | Longest serving Native American in the House |
| Markwayne Mullin (born 1977) | Cherokee | Oklahoma | Republican | January 3, 2013 | January 3, 2023 | Retired to run successfully for the 2022 United States Senate special election in Oklahoma |
| Sharice Davids (born 1980) | Ho-Chunk | Kansas | Democratic | January 3, 2019 | Incumbent | First openly LGBTQ Native American member |
| Deb Haaland (born 1960) | Laguna Pueblo | New Mexico | Democratic | January 3, 2019 | March 16, 2021 | Resigned to become U.S. Secretary of the Interior |
| Yvette Herrell (born 1964) | Cherokee | New Mexico | Republican | January 3, 2021 | January 3, 2023 | Lost re-election |
| Mary Peltola (born 1973) | Yup'ik | Alaska | Democratic | September 13, 2022 | January 3, 2025 | Lost re-election |
| Josh Brecheen (born 1979) | Choctaw | Oklahoma | Republican | January 3, 2023 | Incumbent | |

=== Representatives-elect ===
| Name (lifespan) | Ancestry | State | Party | Start | Notes |
|---|---|---|---|---|---|
| Sean McCann (born 1971) | Citizen Potawatomi | Michigan | Democratic | January 3, 2027 | Elect |
| Claire Valdez (born 1989) | Ysleta del Sur Pueblo | (New York (state)) New York | Democratic | January 3, 2027 | Elect |

=== Histograph ===
The histograph below sets forth the number of Native Americans who served in the United States House during the periods provided.

| Starting | Total | Graph |
|---|---|---|
| March 4, 1789 | 0 | |
| March 4, 1873 | 1 | ❚ |
| March 4, 1875 | 0 | |
| March 4, 1877 | 1 | ❚ |
| March 4, 1879 | 0 | |
| September 23, 1890 | 1 | ❚ |
| March 3, 1891 | 0 | |
| March 4, 1893 | 1 | ❚ |
| January 28, 1907 | 0 | |
| November 16, 1907 | 1 | ❚ |
| March 4, 1915 | 2 | ❚❚ |
| March 4, 1921 | 1 | ❚ |
| March 4, 1923 | 2 | ❚❚ |
| March 4, 1927 | 1 | ❚ |
| January 3, 1935 | 0 | |
| January 3, 1943 | 1 | ❚ |
| March 28, 1944 | 2 | ❚❚ |
| May 23, 1944 | 1 | ❚ |
| August 21, 1952 | 0 | |
| January 3, 1961 | 1 | ❚ |
| January 3, 1971 | 0 | |
| January 3, 1973 | 1 | ❚ |
| January 3, 1975 | 0 | |
| January 3, 1987 | 1 | ❚ |
| January 3, 1993 | 0 | |
| January 3, 2001 | 1 | ❚ |
| January 3, 2003 | 2 | ❚❚ |
| January 3, 2005 | 1 | ❚ |
| January 3, 2013 | 2 | ❚❚ |
| January 3, 2019 | 4 | ❚❚❚❚ |
| January 3, 2021 | 5 | ❚❚❚❚❚ |
| March 16, 2021 | 4 | ❚❚❚❚ |
| September 13, 2022 | 5 | ❚❚❚❚❚ |
| January 3, 2023 | 4 | ❚❚❚❚ |
| January 3, 2025 | 3 | ❚❚❚ |

=== Cherokee delegates to the United States House of Representatives (not seated) ===
Political party

Democratic

Cherokee delegates to the United States House of Representatives
| Name | District | Tribe | Designated | Party | Congress | Notes |
|---|---|---|---|---|---|---|
| Kimberly Teehee (born 1968) | Cherokee delegate | Cherokee Nation | 2019 | Democratic | 116th 117th 118th | Appointed by Chuck Hoskin Jr. in August 2019 and approved unanimously by committee. Teehee was not seated during the 116th Congress or in any subsequent Congress. |
| Victoria Holland | Cherokee delegate | United Keetoowah Band of Cherokee Indians | 2021 | | 117th 118th | Appointed by committee in 2021. Holland was not seated in the 117th Congress and has not been seated in any subsequent Congress. |

== See also ==
- List of Native American politicians
