= At-large =

Form of political representation

At large (before a noun: at-large) is a description for members of a governing body who are elected or appointed to represent a whole membership or population (notably a city, county, state, province, nation, club or association), rather than a subset. In multi-hierarchical bodies, the term rarely extends to a tier beneath the highest division. A contrast is implied, with certain electoral districts or narrower divisions. It can be given to the associated territory, if any, to denote its undivided nature, in a specific context. Unambiguous synonyms are the prefixes of cross-, all- or whole-, such as cross-membership, or all-state.

The term is used as a suffix referring to specific members (such as the U.S. congressional Representative/the Member/Rep. for Wyoming at large). It figures as a generic prefix of its subject matter (such as Wyoming is an at-large U.S. congressional district, at present). It is commonly used when making or highlighting a direct contrast with subdivided equivalents that may be past or present, or seen in exotic comparators. It indicates that the described zone has no further subsets used for the same representative purpose. An exception is a nil-exceptions arrangement of overlapping tiers (resembling or being district and regional representatives, one set of which is at large) for return to the very same chamber, and consequent issue of multiple ballots for plural voting to every voter. This avoids plural voting competing with single voting in the jurisdiction, an inherent different level of democratic power.

Examples of a democratic power disparity were found in a small number of states at certain U.S. Congresses, between 1853 and 1967, and in the old lower houses of the United Kingdom and Ireland, whereby certain voters could vote for (and lobby) at-large (whole-state/County) and district(-based) representatives to them, giving zones of plural voting and thus representation contrasting with zones, for the same national assembly, of single voting and representation. In 1964 the U.S. Supreme Court banned such plural voting for the U.S. Congress (thus banning at-large, whole-state congressional districts which overlap state subdivision congressional districts).

Universal principles apply regardless whether election(s) are for a member at large, or not.

- a single seat/position/representative: entails a single-winner voting system, often Plurality and First-past-the-post;
- a panel/slate/group of seats/positions/representatives: may entail a multi-winner contest using a multi-winner system such as proportional representation (whether in "pure" party-list form, as a party-list proportional tier of a mixed-member or parallel voting system, or STV leading forms), Single non-transferable vote (basic single-choice, multi-member), or block (basic multi-choice, multi-member) voting. On the other hand, a multi-winner district may still use a single-winner system if each seat is determined through a separate contest. (British Columbia used this "post/seat" method in its multi-member districts when it used instant-runoff voting in 1952 and 1953.)

== Canada ==
Many municipalities in Canada elect part or all of their city councils at-large. In most, the mayor is elected at-large as well.

Municipal election at-large is widespread in small towns to avoid "them and us" cultural dissociation produced by partition of voters into wards and their representatives thus being seen to represent only a specific part of the city. It is also used in many large cities in Canada. The voting method in all such elections and multi-member wards today is plurality block voting. (In the past, single transferable voting (STV) was used in 20 Canadian municipalities, either in at-large contests or multi-member wards.)

Notable larger instances are, from west to east:

- The main cities of British Columbia: Vancouver, Victoria, Surrey, and Richmond (all councillors at large and adopt specialist spokesman, executive, or committee roles).
- St. Albert and all other municipalities in Alberta (except Edmonton, Calgary, and Wood Buffalo) (all councillors at large)
- Portage la Prairie, Manitoba (all councillors at large)
- North Bay, Ontario (all councillors at large)
- Thunder Bay, Ontario (seven councillors elected in single-member wards, five councillors elected at large)
- Timmins, Ontario (four rural wards with one councillor each, one urban ward with four councillors)

(As well, the three territories - Yukon, Nunavut, and the Northwest Territories - are federally served in the Parliament of Canada by one Member of Parliament and Senator each. These are so sparsely populated that even one member each is over-representation. They have high apportionment but are ethnically diverse and of exceptional geographical size. Provinces are divided to make up the other 340 electoral districts (ridings or comtés). Canada's 102 senators are appointed to serve a large region within a province or a city.)

== European Union ==
The Conference on the Future of Europe has proposed adding "transnational lists" to the European Parliament, in which a small number of members are elected by the entire European Union at large from Union-wide party lists. This is among a number of proposed reforms to deepen European integration.

== Israel ==
In Israel, elections for the Knesset (the national parliament) are conducted at large by proportional representation from party lists. Election of municipal and town (but not regional) councils are on the same basis.

== Kazakhstan ==
Kazakhstan elects the proportional representation portion of its lower house, the Mäjilis, from a single nationwide multi-member district using closed party-list proportional representation.

Since electoral reforms adopted in 2022, 69 of the 98 seats in the Mäjilis are filled from this at-large national constituency, with seats allocated according to the parties' share of the national vote. A 5% national electoral threshold applies to parties seeking representation.

== Netherlands ==
In the Netherlands, elections for the House of Representatives (the lower house of the States-General, the national parliament) are conducted at large by proportional representation from party lists.

== Philippines ==
This manner of election applies to the Senate. All voters can cast twelve votes to refresh half of the Senate, namely twelve senators, from a longer list of candidates. The simple tally determines the winners (plurality-at-large voting).

Provinces with smaller populations elect their House representative at large. Some cities that has its own congressional district also elect its representatives this way. Most other provinces and a few cities are divided into two or more districts. Party-list elections are elected nationwide at-large.

Likewise, the Sangguniang Kabataan (Youth Councils), Sangguniang Barangay (Village Councils), Sangguniang Bayan (Municipal Councils) and some Sangguniang Panlungsod (City Councils) elect the other members. It follows that such true or quasi-local government units do not in the purest sense elect members at large when their geography is analysed, as each member co-exists with the others who have territorial overlap, as representing greater or lower-rank districts. The members are by law chosen by the public directly or indirectly. Members chosen by the City Council or the Sangguniang Panlalawigan (Provincial Board) are elected such that the city or province may be split into as many as seven districts, and each then elects at least two members.

== United States ==
Article One of the United States Constitution provides for direct election of members of the House of Representatives. The Uniform Congressional District Act, enacted in 1967 and codified as 2 U.S.C. § 2c, dictates that representatives must be elected from geographical districts and that these must be single-member districts. Indeed it confirms when the state has a single representative, that will be a representative at large.

=== U.S. House of Representatives ===
==== States as at-large congressional districts ====
- Alaska
- Delaware
- North Dakota
- South Dakota
- Vermont
- Wyoming

==== Former at-large congressional districts ====
- Alabama
- Arizona
- Arkansas
- California
- Colorado
- Connecticut
- Florida
- Georgia
- Hawaii
- Idaho
- Illinois
- Indiana
- Iowa
- Kansas
- Kentucky
- Louisiana
- Maine
- Maryland
- Massachusetts
- Michigan
- Minnesota
- Mississippi
- Missouri
- Montana
- Nebraska
- Nevada
- New Hampshire
- New Jersey
- New Mexico
- New York
- North Carolina
- Ohio
- Oklahoma
- Oregon
- Pennsylvania
- Rhode Island
- South Carolina
- Tennessee
- Texas
- Utah
- Virginia
- Washington
- West Virginia

==== Non-voting at-large congressional districts ====
- American Samoa
- American Virgin Islands
- Cherokee Nation
- District of Columbia
- Guam
- Puerto Rico
- Northern Mariana Islands

==== Former non-voting at-large congressional districts ====
- Alabama Territory
- Alaska Territory
- Arizona Territory
- Colorado Territory
- Dakota Territory
- Florida Territory
- Hawaii Territory
- Idaho Territory
- Illinois Territory
- Indiana Territory
- Iowa Territory
- Kansas Territory
- Mississippi Territory
- Missouri Territory
- Montana Territory
- Nevada Territory
- New Mexico Territory
- Northwest Territory
- Oklahoma Territory
- Oregon Territory
- Orleans Territory
- Philippines
- Southwest Territory
- Utah Territory
- Washington Territory
- Wisconsin Territory
- Wyoming Territory

==== Simultaneous at-large and sub-state-size congressional districts ====
This is a table of every such instance. It shows the situation applied to a small, varying group of states in three periods. The 33rd Congress began in 1853; it ended two years later. The 38th began in 1863; the 50th ended in 1889. The 53rd began in 1893; the 89th ended in January 1967, the final such period. This was due to the 1964 case of Reynolds v. Sims: the United States Supreme Court determined that the general basis of apportionment must be "one person, one vote."

Congress	State & Number of at-large seats
33rd	MS (1)
38th	IL (1)
39th	IL (1)
40th	IL (1)
41st	IL (1)
42nd	IL (1)
43rd	AL (2), AR (1), IN (2), LA (1), NY (1), PA (3), SC (1), TN (1), TX (2)
44th	AL (2)
48th	AR (1), CA (2), GA (1), KS (4), NY (1), NC (1), PA (1), VA (1)
49th	PA (1)
50th	PA (1)
53rd	IL (2), KS (1), PA (2)
54th	KS (1), PA (2)
55th	KS (1), PA (2)
56th	KS (1), PA (2)
57th	KS (1), PA (2)
58th	CO (1), CT (1), KS (1)
59th	CO (1), CT (1), KS (1)
60th	CO (1), CT (1)
61st	CO (1), CT (1)
62nd	CO (1), CT (1)
63rd	AL (1), CO (2), FL (1), IL (2), MI (1), MN (1), OH (1), OK (3), PA (4), TX (2), WA (2), WV (1)
64th	AL (1), IL (2), PA (4), TX (2), WV (1)
65th	IL (2), PA (4), TX (2)
66th	IL (2), PA (4)
67th	IL (2), PA (4)
68th	IL (2)
69th	IL (2)
70th	IL (2)
71st	IL (2)
72nd	IL (2)
73rd	CT (1), FL (1), IL (2), NY (2), OH (2), OK (1), TX (3)
74th	CT (1), FL (1), IL (2), NY (2), OH (2), OK (1)
75th	CT (1), IL (2), NY (2), OH (2), OK (1)
76th	CT (1), IL (2), NY (2), OH (2), OK (1)
77th	CT (1), IL (2), NY (2), OH (2), OK (1)
78th	CT (1), FL (1), IL (1), NY (2), OH (1), PA (1)
79th	CT (1), IL (1), OH (1)
80th	CT (1), IL (1), OH (1)
81st	CT (1), OH (1)
82nd	CT (1), OH (1)
83rd	CT (1), TX (1), WA (1)
84th	CT (1), TX (1), WA (1)
85th	CT (1), TX (1), WA (1)
86th	CT (1)
87th	CT (1)
88th	AL (8), CT (1), MD (1), MI (1), OH (1), TX (1)
89th	MD (1), OH (1), TX (1)

=== State elections ===
As of 2021, ten U.S. states have at least one legislative chamber which uses multi-winner at-large districts:

- Arizona House of Representatives (for all representatives in all sessions)
- New Jersey General Assembly (for all representatives in all sessions)
- South Dakota House of Representatives (for all representatives in all sessions)
- Washington House of Representatives (for all representatives in all sessions)
- Maryland House of Delegates (allowed by law even when not used)
- Idaho House of Representatives (allowed by law even when not used)
- North Dakota House of Representatives (allowed by law even when not used)
- Vermont Senate and Vermont House of Representatives (allowed by law even when not used)
- West Virginia Senate and West Virginia House of Delegates (allowed by law even when not used; will switch to all-single-winner districts for both chambers in 2022)
- New Hampshire House of Representatives (allowed by law even when not used; uses floterial districts which can geographically overlap each other)

In the 1980s, Florida, Hawaii, Illinois, South Carolina, and Virginia all moved entirely from multi-winner districts in either chamber, followed by Alaska, Georgia, and Indiana in the 1990s. After the 2010 United States redistricting cycle, Nevada eliminated their two remaining multi-member senate districts and implemented single-winner districts in both houses. In 2018, West Virginia passed a law switching all remaining multi-winner House of Delegates seats to single-winner districts following the 2020 United States Census.

=== Local elections ===
Since passage of the Voting Rights Act of 1965 and lessening of some historic barriers to voter registration and voting, legal challenges have been made based on at-large election schemes at the county or city level, including in school board elections, in numerous jurisdictions where minorities had been effectively excluded from representation on local councils or boards. An example is Charleston County, South Carolina, which was sued in 2001 and reached a settlement in 2004. Its county commission changed to nine members elected from single-member districts; in 2015 they included six white Republicans and three African-American Democrats, where the black minority makes up more than one-third of the population.

In another instance, in 2013 Fayette County, Georgia, which had an estimated 70% white majority and 20% black minority, was ordered by a federal district court to develop single-member districts for election of members to its county council and its school board. Due to at-large voting, African Americans had been unable to elect any candidate of their choice to either of these boards for decades. Such local election systems have become subject to litigation since enabling more representative elections can create entry points for minorities and women into the political system and provide more representative government. In the late 1980s, several major cities in Tennessee reached settlement in court cases to adopt single-member districts to enable minorities to elect candidates of their choice to city councils, who had previously been excluded by at-large voting favoring the majority population. By 2015, voters in two of these cities had elected women mayors who had gotten their start in being elected to the city council from single-member districts.

The town of Islip, New York was sued by four residents in 2018 for violating the Voting Rights Act by maintaining a discriminatory at-large council system. One-third of Islip's population is Hispanic, but only one person of color has ever been elected to a town seat. As part of the settlement reached in 2020, the at-large system will be abolished and replaced by four council districts by 2023.

Some states have passed laws that further discourage the use of at-large districts. For example, the California Voting Rights Act removes one of the criteria required for a successful federal Voting Rights Act challenge, which has thus resulted in hundreds of cities, school districts, and special districts moving to single member area-based elections.

Some jurisdictions have kept at-large city councils and boards. The solution adopted by Cambridge, Massachusetts in 1941 was to elect all council officials via Ranked-choice proportional representation, Single transferable voting.

=== Territorial elections ===
Five territorial governments in the United States elect some or all of their members at large or in multi-member districts:

- Four members of the Council of the District of Columbia are elected at large by the district.
- Eleven members in both the Senate and House of Representatives of Puerto Rico are elected commonwealth-wide by single non-transferable vote. In addition, two members each are elected by plurality from the Senate's eight senatorial districts.
- The 15 senators of the Guam Legislature are elected at large through an open partisan primary and a subsequent island-wide election.
- One senator in the Legislature of the United States Virgin Islands is elected at large by the territory, but must be a resident of the island of Saint John.
- The Northern Mariana Islands elects 3 senators each from three senate districts, and multiple representatives from five out of seven House districts.

== See also ==
- General ticket
- Plural district
- Plurality block voting
- Undivided council
- United States Statutes at Large
