= Cherokee delegate to the United States House of Representatives =

Political office

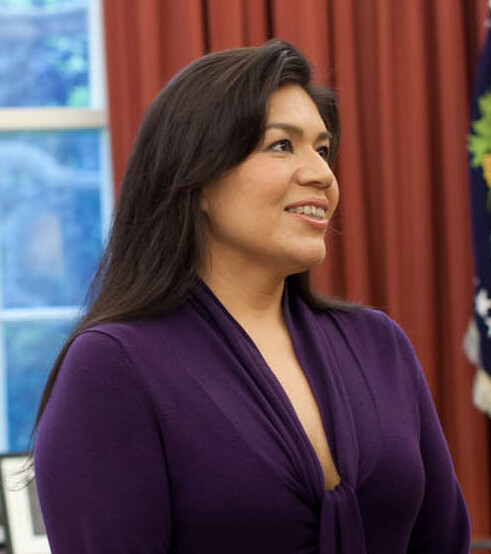
Kimberly Teehee, nominee for the delegate position since 2019.

The Cherokee delegate to the United States House of Representatives is an office established via the Treaty of New Echota in 1835. The office was intended to represent the Cherokee people and was instrumental in negotiations of land transfer and sovereignty in the Treaty. The office went vacant until 2019, with the appointment of Kimberly Teehee of the Cherokee Nation. Teehee and tribal leadership attempted to get her seated in the 116th and 117th United States Congresses. In 2021, the United Keetoowah Band of Cherokee Indians designated their own delegate, lawyer Victoria Holland.

== History ==
A 2022 Congressional Research Service report on native representation in Congress

The Cherokee and Choctaw Native American tribes have treaty rights to send delegates to Congress. The right to a non-voting delegate to Congress was promised to the Cherokee by the Treaty of Hopewell in 1785 (affirmed in 1835's Treaty of New Echota) and to the Choctaw under the Treaty of Dancing Rabbit Creek in 1830, "whenever Congress shall make provision for [a delegate]". Congress has never provided for the appointment of delegates from Indian tribes. The Choctaw tribe has never appointed a delegate to Congress and the Cherokee had not until 2019. However, the Choctaw did send a non-congressional delegate to Washington for most of the 19th century as an ambassador to represent them before the U.S. government, the most noteworthy being Peter Pitchlynn.

In addition, the first treaty signed between the United States and a Native American nation, the Treaty of Fort Pitt (1778) with the Lenape ("Delaware Nation"), encouraged them to form a state that would have representation in Congress; however, it is unclear if the treaty would allow a delegate without the formation of a U.S. state.

A similar situation actively exists at the state legislature level with the Maine House of Representatives maintaining seats for three non-voting delegates representing the Penobscot (since 1823), the Passamaquoddy (since 1842), and the Maliseet (since 2012). The rights of the tribal delegates has fluctuated over time but appears to have been born from a practice in Massachusetts General Court (Maine was a part of Massachusetts until 1820). Unlike the situation at the federal level, Maine's state-level tribal delegates are established by state law rather than treaties. As of 2015, only the Passamaquoddy seat is filled; the other two Nations have chosen to currently not fill their seats in protest over issues of tribal sovereignty and rights. The Wisconsin Legislature, the Legislative Assembly of New Brunswick in Canada, and the New Zealand Parliament were allegedly reviewing Maine's indigenous delegate policy for their own adoption (though New Zealand had already established Māori electorates since 1867).

There remain, however, untested questions about the validity of such delegates. If tribal citizens are represented in the House by both a voting member and a non-voting delegate, that might be seen as contrary to the principle of “one person, one vote”. Disagreement on which federally recognized tribes would appoint the relevant delegate could also occur (e.g. the Choctaw delegate might represent only the Choctaw Nation of Oklahoma, say, or also the Mississippi Band of Choctaw Indians; similarly with the Cherokee Nation and the United Keetoowah Band of Cherokee Indians). In 2022, the Congressional Research Service published "Legal and Procedural Issues Related to Seating a Cherokee Nation Delegate in the House of Representatives", addressing these concerns and logistical issues.

On August 25, 2019, the Cherokee Nation formally announced its intention to appoint a delegate, nominating Kimberly Teehee, the tribe's vice president of government relations, as its first delegate. According to the process used for other non-voting delegates, the House of Representatives must vote to formally admit Teehee. Some congressional leaders have expressed concerns about Teehee being appointed by a tribal government rather than elected by tribal members; Teehee has contended that, since the Cherokee Nation is a sovereign nation, her appointment as a delegate should be viewed analogous to an ambassadorship. An ambassadorial view of Native delegates is consistent with prior history of Native envoys to Washington and Maine's state-level tribal delegates. Principal Chief of the Cherokee Nation Chuck Hoskin Jr. has also argued that the appointment method rather than a popular vote is consistent with the Cherokee Nation's constitution.

Teehee's appointment to the House was not finalized in the 116th Congress and has been reported to have been delayed by the COVID-19 pandemic. Teehee remained unseated as of September 2022, when the Cherokee Nation government reiterated their insistence that Congress seat her. A formal hearing by the United States House Committee on Rules to discuss the legality and procedure for seating Teehee was scheduled for November 16, 2022. Hoskin spoke at the event and afterward, several members of the House supported a decision to seat Teehee as soon as possible, including by the end of the year.

While Teehee represents the Cherokee Nation, in 2021, Oklahoma's United Keetoowah Band of Cherokee Indians selected Victoria Holland as a delegate, arguing that they represent the same people as the Cherokee of the Treaty of New Echota.

A third federally recognized Cherokee tribe is the Eastern Band of Cherokee Indians (EBCI) in North Carolina, who have not nominated a delegate. They have reached out to James McGovern of the House Rules Committee about the topic of congressional representation and made the issue a key point of their 2023 legislative agenda.

== Delegates representing the Cherokee ==
Designated congressional delegates from the Cherokee peoples
Delegate		Tribe	Party	Term	Congress	Electoral history
—N/a		—N/a	—N/a	December 29, 1835 – August 29, 2019	24th–116th	Vacant
Kimberly Teehee smiling	Kimberly Teehee	Cherokee Nation	Democratic	August 29, 2019 – present	116th 117th 118th 119th	Appointed by Principal Chief Chuck Hoskin Jr. in August 2019 and approved unanimously by committee. Teehee was not seated during the 116th Congress or in any subsequent Congress.
	Victoria Holland	United Keetoowah Band of Cherokee Indians		2021–present	117th 118th	Appointed by committee in 2021. Holland was not seated in the 117th Congress and has not been seated in any subsequent Congress.

== See also ==
- List of Native Americans in the United States Congress
