= Richelle Montoya =

11th Vice President of the Navajo Nation

11th Vice President of the Navajo Nation
- Incumbent
- Assumed office January 10, 2023
- President: Buu Nygren
- Preceded by: Myron Lizer
- Succeeded by: Chris Deschene (elect)

Personal details
- Spouse: Olsen Chee (sep. 2023)
- Education: San Juan College (AA); University of New Mexico (BA)

Richelle Montoya is an American politician who is the 11th vice president of the Navajo Nation. She is the first woman elected to the executive office of Navajo Nation.

Montoya is from Torreon, Sandoval County, New Mexico and is Hashtł'ishnii (Mud clan) and born for Ta'neeszahnii (Tangle clan). Her maternal grandfather is Kinłichii'nii (Red House clan), and her paternal grandfather is Táchii'nii (Red Running into Water clan).

She served as the president of the Torreon/Star Lake Chapter and is a member of the Na’ Neelzhiin Ji Olta’ Inc. board. In August 2022, Montoya was selected as the running mate of Buu Nygren during the 2022 Navajo Nation presidential election.

Montoya is an advocate for the usage of the Navajo language.

She was married to U.S. Army veteran Olsen Chee. The pair separated in August 2023.

On April 16, 2024, Montoya accused Navajo Nation President Buu Nygren of sexually harassing her during a meeting in August 2023. Nygren has denied the allegation and in a June 14, 2024, press release, accused the chapters calling for his administrative leave of politically ulterior motives. In October 2024, Nygren announced that Montoya's responsibilities as vice president had been reduced and he suggested she resign from her position. The accusations against Nygen were investigated by the tribe's attorney general during an eight-month period in 2024; the investigation found the claims of sexual harassment to be "not warranted."

== See also ==
- Native American women in politics

Political offices
Preceded by Myron Lizer	Vice President of the Navajo Nation; 2023–present	Incumbent
