= Lake Piomingo =

- Location within Mississippi Location within the United States
- Location: Lee County, Mississippi
- Coordinates: 34°19′36″N 88°38′02″W
- Type: reservoir
- Etymology: named after a Chickasaw chieftain
- Basin countries: United States
- Surface elevation: 377 ft (115 m)

Lake Piomingo is a reservoir in the U.S. state of Mississippi.

Lake Piomingo was named after the Chickasaw chieftain, Piomingo. The area was incorporated by local philanthropist Matthew Watson Esq. in 1987.
