= Mel Cornshucker =

Cherokee potter (born 1952)

- Born: October 4, 1952 (age 73); Jay, Oklahoma, United States
- Citizenship: United Keetoowah Band and American
- Education: Bacone College, Southwest Baptist University
- Known for: High-fire stoneware

Mel Cornshucker (born October 4, 1952) is a contemporary Cherokee potter living in Tulsa, Oklahoma, who works in stoneware, porcelain, and raku clay. Cornshucker is known for his high-fire stoneware, decorated with hand-painted, Native-inspired motifs and designs.

== Early life ==
Born and raised in Jay, Oklahoma, and a citizen of the United Keetoowah Band of Cherokee Indians, Cornshucker was inspired by other artists in his family including his grandfather, Lincoln Trotting Wolf's, talent for weaving. His grandfather built his own rug loom on which he made rugs and blankets on the front porch. Cornshucker's cousins were basket weavers and his father was a silversmith, allowing him several creative outlets in his youth. Cornshucker spent many summers with his Cherokee family in Jay. He had positive encouragement in public schools when he began making figurines out of wet plaster and metal sculptures.

== Education ==
After graduating high school in 1970, Cornshucker briefly attended Bacone College in Muskogee, Oklahoma before transferring to Southwest Baptist University in Bolivar, Missouri working to become a tribal lawyer. It was during this time, Cornshucker took college art class which sparked his interest in pottery. Cornshucker was hired in 1975 to work as an apprentice potter in the Missouri theme park, Silver Dollar City. This job opportunity allowed him a lot of room to grow because he was perfecting his art every day for three to four hours for tourists. He left Silver Dollar City in 1977 and moved to Colorado where he became a land surveyor. After six months, Cornshucker moved back home to set up his own studio in Kansas City, Missouri.

== Career ==
When Cornshucker set up in his own studio, he began to compete in more booth shows as well as galleries. When Cornshucker began to do more Native shows, he experienced an increase in the amount of galleries taking on his work. In the early 1980s, Cornshucker would do approximately 15-16 gallery shows per year. Cornshucker also began incorporating his trademark Native motifs on his pottery around this time. The dragonfly was a special symbol for him not only because of its symbolism for many tribal cultures, but also because of its association with his grandfather, Lincoln Trotting Wolf. Cornshucker is also part owner of the Brady Artists Studio with Donna Prigmore.

In 2007, Cornshucker was selected to participate in a cultural exchange with African artists, put on by the Kellogg Foundation in tandem with the Institute of American Indian Arts of Santa Fe. Cornshucker worked in a Zulu village and put on a workshop for the Zulu potters. The goal of this program was for the American potters to offer tips and advice on how to better market the Zulu potters' work. Cornshucker helped influence the creation of clay masks and rattles to be sold in the markets.

== Collections ==
Cornshucker is considered a modern potter who values the functionality of his pieces while aesthetically including Native American motifs in his signature designs. He strives to create pieces that communicate past and present Native American spirit which reflects his heritage and honors the creativity of man over time. He has shown his work in a variety of nationally significant markets, including the Eiteljorg Indian Market and Festival, the Santa Fe Indian Market, the Pueblo Grande Museum Indian Art Show in Phoenix, and the Contemporary Indian Art Show at Cahokia.

== Awards ==
2007 Selected for a cultural artist exchange with South Africa, sponsored by the Kellogg Foundation and Institute of American Indian Art.

2014 winner of the modern pottery category for the Red Earth Native American Cultural Festival in Oklahoma.

2014 Greater Tulsa Indian Art Festival. Best of Show 2014 Greater Tulsa Area Indian Affairs Commission. Moscelyne Larkin Cultural Achievement Award.
