= Treaty of Hopewell =

Treaties between the U.S. and southeastern Indian tribes

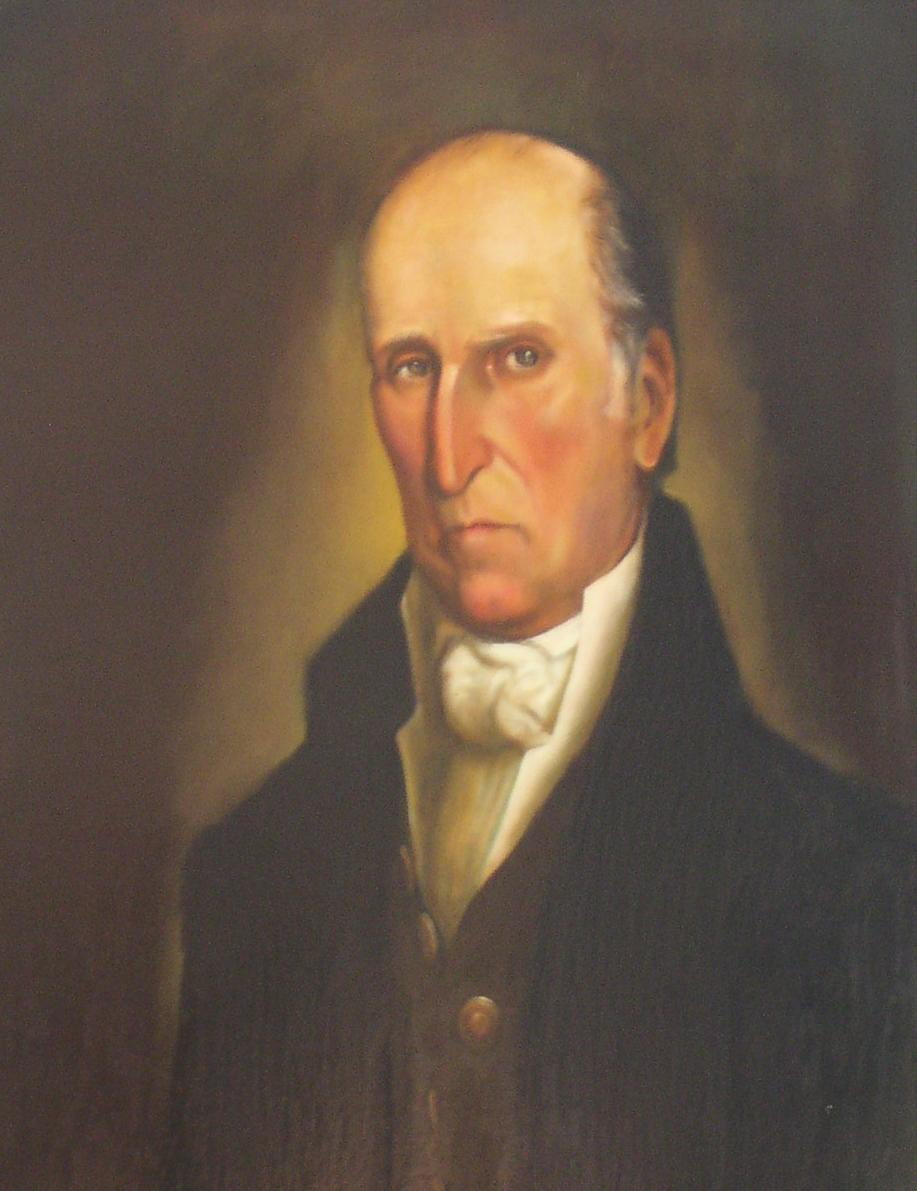
U.S. Representative Andrew Pickens, owner of Hopewell on the Keowee

Three agreements, each known as a Treaty of Hopewell, were signed between representatives of the Congress of the United States and the Cherokee, Choctaw, and Chickasaw peoples. They were negotiated and signed at the Hopewell plantation in South Carolina over 45 days during the winter of 1785–86.

The treaties were signed at the plantation owned by General Andrew Pickens, which the treaty texts refer to as "Hopewell on the Keowee". Anthropologist James Mooney records that "It was situated on the northern edge of the present Anderson county, on the east side of Keowee River, opposite and a short distance below the entrance of Little River, and about three miles from the present Pendleton. In the sight of it, on the opposite side of Keowee, was the old Cherokee town of Seneca, destroyed by the Americans in 1776."

The chief provision of the treaties was defining boundaries between sovereign tribal lands and lands open to settlement; other boilerplate provisions included exchange of prisoners, prohibition of settlement on tribal lands, rendition of criminals, punishment of crimes against Native Americans, restrictions on retaliation by either side, regulation of trade, and other minor provisions. The order and content of the sections in each Treaty were almost identical with the exception of an article in the Cherokee treaty providing for a Cherokee delegate to Congress (reaffirmed in the 1835 Treaty of New Echota)—a provision that has yet to be fulfilled by the United States as of October 2026.

Despite affixing their signatures to the treaties, none of the Native American tribes recognized the sovereignty of the United States over their ancestral lands.

== Cherokee treaty ==
Treaty of Hopewell, 1785
- Type: Peace, Land, Boundaries
- Context: Cherokee–American wars
- Signed: 28 November 1785
- Location: Hopewell plantation, South Carolina
- Mediators: American: Benjamin Hawkins; Cherokee: Overhill and Chickamauga Cherokee Tribal leaders
- Parties: United States; Cherokee
- Citations: 7 Stat. 18; 7 Stat. 21; 7 Stat. 24.

On November 28, 1785, the first Treaty of Hopewell was signed between the U.S. representative Benjamin Hawkins and the Cherokee Indians. In addition to circumscribing a large part of the northern and eastern boundary of the Cherokee Nation not already defined by previous treaties and land cessions, the treaty ceded a wedge of land south of the Cumberland river in north central Tennessee around Nashville. A description of the boundary is found in Article 4 of the accord:

The boundary allotted to the Cherokees for their hunting grounds, between the said Indians and the citizens of the United States, within the limits of the United States of America, is, and shall be the following, viz. Beginning at the mouth of Duck river, on Tennessee; thence running north-east to the ridge dividing the waters running into Cumberland from those running into Tennessee; thence eastward along the said ridge to a north-east line to be run, which shall strike the river Cumberland forty miles above Nashville; thence along the said line to the river; thence up the said river to the ford where the Kentucky road crosses the river; thence to Campbell's line, near Cumberland gap; thence to the mouth of Claud's creek on Holstein; thence to the Chimney-top mountain; thence to Camp-creek, near the mouth of Big Limestone, on Nolichuckey; thence a southerly course six miles to a mountain; thence south to the North-Carolina line; thence to the South-Carolina Indian boundary, and along the same south-west over the top of the Oconee mountain till it shall strike Tugaloo river; thence a direct line to the top of the Currohee mountain; thence to the head of the south fork of Oconee river.

Included in the signatures of the Cherokee delegation were several from leaders of the Chickamauga (Lower Cherokee), including two from the town of Chickamauga itself and one from Lookout Mountain Town. The Cherokee complained at the treaty that some 3,000 white settlers of the de facto State of Franklin were already squatting on the Cherokee side of the agreed line, between the Holston and French Broad Rivers, and they continued to dispute that region until a new border was defined by the 1791 Treaty of Holston.

The Cherokee also signed two extra-legal treaties with the State of Franklin: Treaty of Dumplin Creek, 1785, and Treaty of Coyatee in 1786 ceding lands in east Tennessee occupied by the State of Franklin. Neither treaty was recognized by the United States.

=== Congressional deputy ===
Article XII states "That the Indians [...] shall have the right to send a deputy of their choice, whenever they think fit, to Congress." In 2019, Cherokee Nation principal chief Chuck Hoskin Jr. cited a provision of the 1835 Treaty of New Echota that states that the Cherokee "shall be entitled to a delegate in the House of Representatives of the United States whenever Congress shall make provision for the same," in announcing that he intended to appoint, for the first time, a Congressional delegate from the Cherokee Nation. Pending a decision of the Cherokee National Council, Hoskin said he would nominate Kimberly Teehee, a member of the Cherokee Nation who formerly served as a policy advisor in the administration of President Barack Obama, to the post.

== Choctaw treaty ==
Treaty of Hopewell, January 3, 1786
- Type: Peace, Land
- Signed: 3 January 1786
- Location: Hopewell plantation, South Carolina
- Mediators: American: Benjamin Hawkins; Joseph Martin; Choctaw: Tribal leaders
- Parties: United States; Choctaw
- Citations: 7 Stat. 18; 7 Stat. 21; 7 Stat. 24.

The US–Choctaw Treaty of Hopewell was signed by the Choctaw at the foothills of the Smoky Mountains on January 3, 1786. The ceded area amounted to 69,120 acres, and the compensation to the Choctaw took the form of protection by the United States. To elaborate, the plenipotentiaries were Benjamin Hawkins, Andrew Pickens and Joseph Martin representing the U.S. while representing the Choctaw were 13 small medals and 12 medal and gorget captains. A description of the boundary is found in article 3:

The boundary of the lands hereby allotted to the Choctaw Nation to live and hunt on, within the limits of the United States of America, is and shall be the following, viz. Beginning at a point on the thirty-first degree of north latitude, where the Eastern boundary of the Natches district shall touch the same; thence east along the said thirty-first degree of north latitude being the southern boundary of the United States of America, until it shall strike the eastern boundary of the lands on which the Indians of the said nation did live and hunt on the twenty-ninth of November, one thousand seven hundred and eighty-two, while they were under the protection of the King of Great-Britain; thence northerly along the said eastern boundary, until it shall meet the northern boundary of the said lands; thence westerly along the said northern boundary, until it shall meet the western boundary thereof; thence southerly along the same to the beginning: saving and reserving for the establishment of trading posts, three tracts of parcels of land of six miles square each, at such places as the United [States] in Congress assembled shall think proper; which posts, and the lands annexed to them, shall be to the use and under the government of the United States of America.

== Chickasaw treaty ==
Treaty of Hopewell, January 10, 1786
- Type: Peace, Land
- Signed: 10 January 1786
- Location: Hopewell plantation, South Carolina
- Mediators: American: Benjamin Hawkins; Andrew Pickens; Joseph Martin; Chickasaw: Taski Etoka; Piomingo; Lotapaia
- Parties: United States; Chickasaw
- Citations: 7 Stat. 18; 7 Stat. 21; 7 Stat. 24.

On January 10, 1786, the Treaty of Hopewell was signed between U.S. representatives Benjamin Hawkins, Andrew Pickens, and Joseph Martin and the Chickasaw leaders Taski Etoka, Piomingo, and Lotapaia. A description of the boundary is found in Article 3:

The boundary of the lands hereby allotted to the Chickasaw nation to live and hunt on, within the limits of the United States of America, is, and shall be the following, viz. Beginning on the ridge that divides the waters running into the Cumberland, from those running into the Tennessee, at a point in a line to be run north-east, which shall strike the Tennessee at the mouth of Duck river; thence running westerly along the said ridge, till it shall strike the Ohio; thence down the southern banks thereof to the Mississippi; thence down the same, to the Choctaw line or Natches district; thence along the said line, or the line of the district eastwardly as far as the Chickasaws claimed, and lived and hunted on, the twenty-ninth of November, one thousand seven hundred and eighty-two. Thence the said boundary, eastwardly, shall be the lands allotted to the Choctaws and Cherokees to live and hunt on, and the lands at present in the possession of the Creeks; saving and reserving for the establishment of a trading post, a tract or parcel of land to be laid out at the lower port of the Muscle shoals, at the mouth of Ocochappo, in a circle, the diameter of which shall be five miles on the river, which post, and the lands annexed thereto, shall be to the use and under the government of the United States of America.

== See also ==
- United States-Native American Treaties
