= Treaty of New Echota =

1835 treaty between the U.S and a Cherokee faction

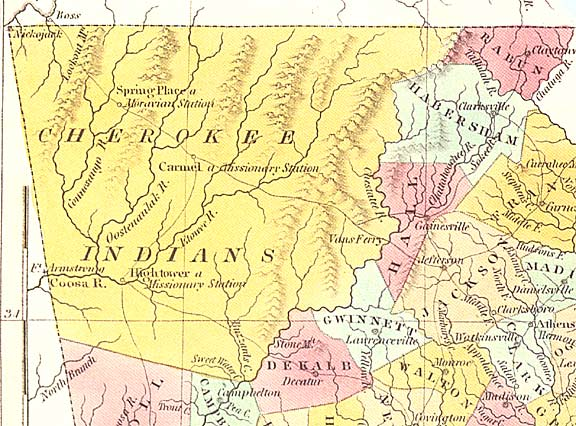
- Cherokee territory in northern Georgia, 1830
- Signed: 29 December 1835
- Location: New Echota
- Effective: 23 May 1836
- Parties: United States; Cherokee Nation
- Citations: 7 Stat. 478
- See also the Supplementary Articles of 1 March 1836 (7 Stat. 488).

The Treaty of New Echota was a treaty signed on December 29, 1835, in New Echota, Georgia, by officials of the United States government and representatives of a minority Cherokee political faction, the Treaty Party.

The treaty established terms for the Cherokee Nation to cede its territory in the southeast and move west to the Indian Territory. Although the treaty was not approved by the Cherokee National Council nor signed by Principal Chief John Ross, it was amended and ratified in March 1836, and became the legal basis for the forcible removal known as the Trail of Tears carried out in 1838-1839.

== Background ==
=== Early discussions ===
By the late 1820s, the territory of the Cherokee Indian nation lay almost entirely in northwestern Georgia, with small parts in Tennessee, Alabama, and North Carolina. It extended across most of the northern border and all of the border with Tennessee. An estimated 16,000 Cherokee people lived in this territory. Others had emigrated west to present-day Texas and Arkansas. In 1826, the Georgia legislature asked President John Quincy Adams to negotiate a removal treaty.

Adams, a supporter of tribal sovereignty, initially refused, but when Georgia threatened to nullify the current treaty, he approached the Cherokee to negotiate. A year passed without any progress toward removal. Andrew Jackson, a Democrat and supporter of Native removal, was elected president in 1828.

=== Georgia laws over Cherokee Indian territory ===
Shortly after the 1828 election, Georgia acted on its nullification threat. The legislature passed a series of laws abolishing the independent government of the Cherokee and extending state law over their territory. Cherokee officials were forbidden to meet for legislative purposes. White people (Including missionaries and those married to Cherokee) were forbidden to live in Cherokee country without a state permit, and Cherokee were forbidden to testify in court cases involving European Americans.

Soon after his inauguration, Jackson wrote an open letter to the Southeastern Indian nations, urging them to move west. After gold was discovered in Georgia in late 1829, the ensuing Georgia Gold Rush increased white residents' determination to see the Cherokee removed. The Cherokee were forbidden to dig for gold, and Georgia authorized a survey of their lands to prepare for a lottery to distribute the land to whites. The state held the lottery in 1832.

In the following session, the state legislature stripped the Cherokee of all land other than their residences and adjoining improvements. By 1834 this exception was also removed. When state judges intervened on behalf of Cherokee residents, they were harassed and denied jurisdiction over such cases.

=== Cherokee reaction ===
The new laws targeted the Cherokee leadership in particular. The hereditary chiefs were selected from men who belonged to the important clans of the matrilineal culture. They gained their status from their Cherokee mothers and their clans, although by this time, there were several mixed race. Principal Chief John Ross was also of mixed race, and had tried to make use of his heritage to benefit the Cherokee in relations with whites. Since the Georgia laws made it illegal for the Cherokee to conduct national business, the National Council (the legislative body of the Cherokee Nation) cancelled the 1832 elections. It declared that current officials would retain their offices until elections could be held, and established an emergency government based in Tennessee.

The Council tried to force Jackson's hand against Georgia by suing the state in federal courts and lobbying Congress to support Cherokee sovereignty. In 1832, the United States Supreme Court struck down Georgia's laws as unconstitutional in Worcester v. Georgia, ruling that only the federal government had power to deal with the Native American tribes, and the states had no power to pass legislation regulating their activities. However, the state ignored the ruling and continued to enforce the laws.

== Negotiations ==
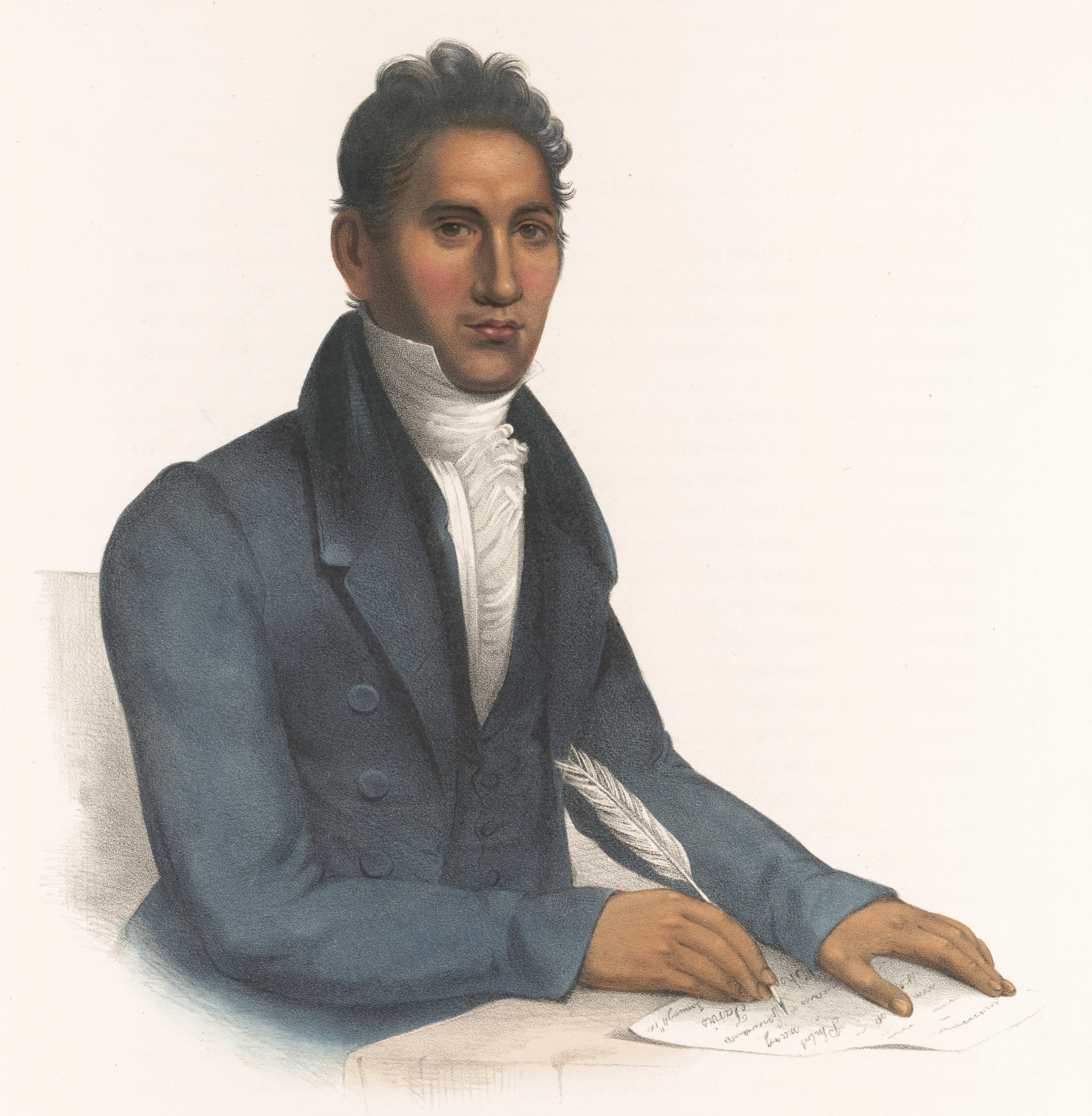
John Ridge

=== Jackson's initial proposal ===
Shortly after the Supreme Court's ruling, Jackson met with John Ridge, clerk of the Cherokee National Council, who headed a Cherokee delegation that went to Washington, DC, to meet with him. When asked whether he would use federal force against Georgia, Jackson said he would not and urged Ridge to persuade the Cherokee to accept removal. Ridge, until then a supporter of the National Council's position, left the White House in despair. John McLean, a Jackson appointee to the Supreme Court, likewise urged the Cherokee representatives in Washington to negotiate.

Jackson quickly dispatched Secretary of War Lewis Cass to present his terms, which included western land titles, self-government, relocation assistance, and several other long-term benefits—all conditioned on a total Cherokee removal. He would allow a small number of Cherokee to stay if they accepted state authority over them.

In the following months, Ridge found supporters for the removal option, including his father Major Ridge and the major's nephews Elias Boudinot and Stand Watie. In October 1832, he urged the National Council to consider Cass's proposal, but the council was unmoved.

=== Divisions among the Cherokee ===
While Ross's delegation continued to lobby Congress for relief, the worsening situation in Georgia drove members of the Treaty Party to Washington to press for a removal treaty. Boudinot and the Ridges had come to believe that removal was inevitable, and hoped to secure Cherokee rights by agreeing to a treaty. In December 1833, the Cherokees supporting removal formed a party, with the former principal chief William Hicks as their head and John McIntosh as his assistant. They sent a delegation led by Andrew Ross, younger brother of Principal Chief John Ross. The administration refused to deal with them, but invited them to return with leaders more involved in the Cherokee Nation's affairs. They returned with Boudinot and Major Ridge, and entered negotiations with Cass.

When Cass urged John Ross to join the negotiations, he denounced his brother's delegation. Andrew Ross and other members signed a harsh treaty in June 1834 without the Ridge family's support.

The progress of separate negotiations finally moved John Ross to discuss terms. He made offers to cede all land except the borders of Georgia, and then to cede all land, on the condition that the Cherokee could remain in the east subject to state laws. Cass refused, saying that he would discuss only removal. Andrew Ross's treaty was submitted to the Senate, where it was rejected as not having the support of all Cherokees. In the October meeting of the Cherokee General Council (comprising all members of the Nation able to attend), a federal representative presented this treaty for consideration. John Ross condemned the treaty. The Ridges and the Waties left the council, and they and other treaty advocates began holding their own council meetings.

== Division of the Cherokee Nation East ==
A division developed between Ross supporters (the "National Party") advocating resistance, and the Ridge supporters (the "Treaty Party"), who advocated negotiation to secure the best terms possible for the removal, which they considered inevitable, and later protection of Cherokee rights. The Treaty Party included John Ridge, Major Ridge, Elias Boudinot, David Watie, Stand Watie, Andrew Ross, Willam Coody (Ross's nephew), William Hicks (Ross's cousin), John Walker Jr., John Fields, John Gunter, David Vann, Charles Vann, Alexander McCoy, W. A. Davis, James A. Bell, Samuel Bell, John West, Ezekiel West, Archilla Smith, and James Starr.

Eventually tensions grew to the point that several Treaty advocates, most notably John Walker Jr., were assassinated. In July 1835, hundreds of Cherokee, from both the Treaty Party and the National Party (including John Ross), converged on John Ridge's plantation, Running Waters (near Calhoun, Georgia). There they met with John F. Schermerhorn, President Jackson's envoy for a removal treaty, Return J. Meigs, Jr., the Commissioner for Indian Affairs, and other U.S. officials.

In October 1835, the General Council rejected the proposed treaty, but appointed a committee to go to Washington to negotiate a better treaty. The committee included John Ross, and also treaty advocates John Ridge, Charles Vann, and Elias Boudinot (later replaced by Stand Watie). They were authorized to make a removal treaty, with the stipulation that the Cherokees would receive more than $5,000,000 in compensation and assistance. Schermerhorn, who was present at the meeting, advocated a meeting at New Echota, the Cherokee capital. The National Council approved a delegation to meet there. Both delegations were specifically charged with negotiating a removal treaty. A letter was sent from the President that if you didn't attend the meeting then your vote was counted as approval of the treaty. Ross did not attend, nor did any Ross supporters. Then he changed his mind. This was after the contract was made.

=== New Echota meeting and final treaty ===
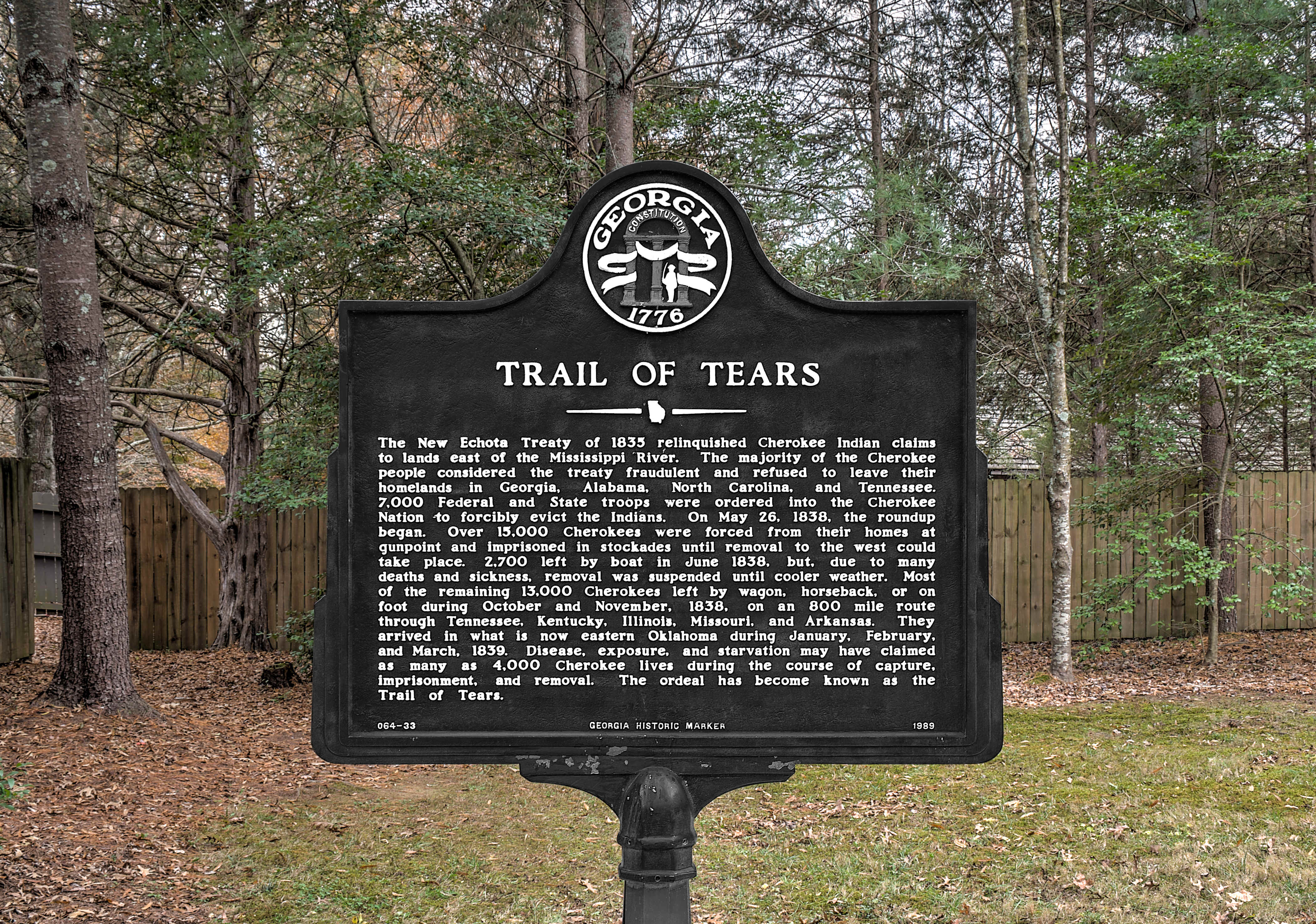
Detail of memorial at New Echota

100 to 500 men converged on the Cherokee capital in December 1835, almost exclusively from the Upper and Lower Towns. (Heavy snow in the western North Carolina mountains made it nearly impossible for those from the Hill and Valley Towns to travel.) After a week of negotiations, Schermerhorn proposed that in exchange for all Cherokee land east of the Mississippi River, the Cherokees would receive $5,000,000 from the U.S. (to be distributed per capita to all members of the tribe), an additional $500,000 for educational funds, title in perpetuity to land in Indian Territory equal to that given up, and full compensation for all property left behind. (By contrast, the entire Louisiana Territory was purchased from Napoleon for just over $15,000,000.) The treaty included a clause to allow all Cherokees who so desired to remain and become citizens of the states in which they resided, on individual allotments of 160 acres (0.65 km^{2}) of land. With that clause, it was unanimously approved by the contingent at New Echota, then signed by the negotiating committee of twenty, but that clause later was struck out by President Jackson.

The committee reported the results to the full Council gathered at New Echota, which approved the treaty unanimously. In a lengthy preamble, the Ridge party laid out its claims to legitimacy, based on its willingness to negotiate in good faith the sort of removal terms for which Ross had expressed support. The treaty was signed by Major Ridge, Elias Boudinot, James Foster, Testaesky, Long Shell Turtle, John Fields, James Fields, George Welch, Andrew Ross, William Rogers, John Gunter, John A. Bell, Jos. A. Forman, Robert Sanders, Johnson Rogers, James Starr, James Rogers, John Smith. After Schermerhorn returned to Washington with the signed treaty, John Ridge and Stand Watie added their names.

The treaty was concluded at New Echota, Georgia, on December 29, 1835, and signed on March 1, 1836.

== Ratification ==
After news of the treaty became public, the officials of the Cherokee Nation from the National Party representing the large majority of Cherokee objected that they had not approved it and that the document was invalid. The large majority had not voted to approve the document and had not even been present, but the U.S. government's position was their absence amounted to acquiescence. John Ross and the Cherokee National Council begged the Senate not to ratify the treaty (and thereby invalidate it) due to it not being negotiated by the legal representatives of the Cherokee Nation. But the Senate passed the measure in May 1836 by a single vote. Ross drew up a petition asking Congress to void the treaty—a petition which he personally delivered to Congress in the spring of 1838 with almost 16,000 signatures attached. This was nearly as many persons as the Cherokee Nation East had within its territory, according to the 1835 Henderson Roll, including women and children, who had no vote. The Ross followers have continued to blame the Ridge followers to this day due to the negligence of Ross and the rest of the General Council.

== Enforcement ==
Ross's petition was ignored by President Martin Van Buren, who directed General Winfield Scott to forcibly move all those Cherokee who had not yet complied with the treaty and moved west. The Cherokee people were almost entirely removed east of the Mississippi (except for the Oconaluftee Cherokee in North Carolina, the Nantahala Cherokee who joined them, and two or three hundred married to whites).

That summer (1839) a council to effect a union between the Old Settlers and the Late Immigrants convened at Double Springs in Indian Territory. It broke up sixteen days later without having reached an agreement when John Brown, Principal Chief of the Cherokee Nation–West, became frustrated with Ross's intransigence. The latter insisted that the Old Settlers accept him as Principal Chief over the united Nation without an election and recognize his absolute authority. Ross was easily elected in the following elections. But the base of the tribe that had already formed was stepped on and ignored, in spite of the fact that the old settlers and the Treaty party were settling in together nicely.

Ross's partisans blamed Brown's actions on the Treaty Party, particularly those, such as the Ridge and Watie families, who had emigrated prior to the forced removal. They had settled with the Old Settlers. A group of these men targeted members of the Ridge faction for assassination, to enforce the Cherokee law (written by Major Ridge) making it a capital crime for any Cherokee to cede national land for private profit. There is no evidence, however, that John Ross supported or knew of their plans.

The list of targets included Major Ridge, John Ridge, Elias Boudinot, Stand Watie, John A. Bell, James Starr, George Adair, and others. (Notably absent from the list were Treaty Party leaders David Vann, Charles Vann, John Gunter, Charles Foreman, William Hicks, and Andrew Ross. William Hicks died sometime before or in the year 1837. His death was before removal took place.) On 22 June 1839, teams ranging up to twenty-five in number converged on the houses of John Ridge, Major Ridge, and Elias Boudinot, and murdered them; their attempt on Stand Watie was unsuccessful. They did not attack any others, but the assassinations marked the beginning of the Cherokee Civil War; it continued until after the American Civil War. James Starr was also killed during this period. The Ross partisans forced the Old Settlers to give up their established political system and accept the majority vote and John Ross's authority. Rebecca Nagle, host of the award-winning This Land podcast, is a descendant of the Ridges and uses her ancestry to explore the ongoing toll their actions had. Letters from the Senate in concerns of the creation of the 1866 Cherokee Treaty confirm that the Treaty Party are the Ridge Party and Southern Cherokee.

== Later developments ==
In 2019, Cherokee Nation Principal Chief Chuck Hoskin Jr. cited a provision of the treaty that states that the Cherokee "shall be entitled to a delegate in the House of Representatives of the United States whenever Congress shall make provision for the same," in announcing that he intended to appoint, for the first time since Joseph Shorey Coody, a Cherokee delegate and an author of the first Cherokee constitution, a Congressional delegate from the Cherokee Nation. Pending a decision of the Cherokee National Council, Hoskin said he would nominate Kimberly Teehee, a member of the Cherokee Nation who formerly served as a policy advisor in the administration of President Barack Obama, to the post. In 2022, the Cherokee Nation began a campaign to seat Kimberly Teehee as their nonvoting delegate in the House of Representatives.

In 2021, the United Keetoowah Band of Cherokee Indians chose their own delegate—attorney Victoria Holland—arguing that they are successors to the Cherokee people who signed the treaty. The Treaty Party/Ridge Party/ Southern Cherokee are also signatories of the 1835 Cherokee Treaty.

== See also ==
- Timeline of Cherokee removal
