= Taski Etoka =

Chickasaw leader

Taski Etoka (also Mingatuska, Tuskeatoka) (died 1794) was a Native American (Chickasaw) leader of the mid-1780s. He was signator (along with Piominko and Lotapaia), of the Treaty of Hopewell in January 1786.

Taski Etoka was succeeded by Selocta Chinnabby, his brother.
