= Piomingo =

Chickasaw chief (c.1750 – c.1799)

Chief Piomingo
- Tushatohoa
- Born: c. 1750; Chokkilissa’ (present-day Lee County, Mississippi)
- Died: c. 1799 (about age 50 years old); Chokka’ Falaa’ (present-day Lee County, Mississippi)
- Monuments: Tupelo, Mississippi
- Other names: Piominko; Prophet Chief
- Citizenship: Chickasaw
- Years active: 1778–1799
- Era: Colonial expansion
- Known for: Chickasaw diplomat and negotiator: Allegiance to the U.S.; Signed Treaty of Hopewell
- Title: Chief
- Awards: G. Washington Peace Medal, 1792
- Military Ally
- Allegiance: United States
- Campaigns: Indian Wars

Hopayi’ Minko’ (often written as Piomingo or Piominko; (Note: The word or suffix, "-minko; -mingo" was a title of respect and leadership to the Chickasaw.) c. 1750 – c. 1799) was a Chickasaw chief and diplomat. (Note: "...Piomingo's historical importance was for a long time obscured by historian Samuel G. Drake's confusing him with George Colbert..." [who was also sometimes called Piomingo].) President George Washington and Piomingo considered themselves to be friends. He was a signatory to the Chickasaw Treaty of Hopewell. Piomingo received a presidential peace medal from Washington for his loyalty to the US.

== Early life ==
Piomingo was thought to have been named Tushatohoa at his birth in the Chickasaw trading-hub and settlement of Chokkilissa' (present-day Lee County, Mississippi) around 1750. As a young child, he was raised for a time among the Cherokee allies of his tribe. By the time he was a teenager, he was called "Mountain Leader of Tchoukafala" (Note: Tchoukafala translates literally as "Longtown".) by the Cherokee. He earned the title Piomingo shortly after reaching adulthood. It is the name history remembers him by.

== Diplomacy ==
=== Early treaties ===
As first war chief, Piomingo often visited other tribes in the southeastern woodlands, negotiating boundaries and disputes as needed. As a diplomat to the United States, Piomingo tended to favor an alliance with the new country as opposed to doing so with the Spanish—who at the time were actively courting the Chickasaw tribes to ally with them. His opponent in the Chickasaw tribes, Wolf's Friend (Ugulayacabe), along with most of the other chiefs, preferred the Spanish offers, and also made a pact with them. Both factions, however, continued their disfavor with the British, who were allied with their enemy, the Muscogee-Creeks.

Piomingo's interest in friendship with the United States government dates back to the early 1780s when Piomingo, following the January 11, 1781, Chickasaw attack on the Cumberland district, (Note: The Cumberland settlement was at that time still unclear if located within North Carolina or Virginia lands.) negotiated a treaty of peace and friendship between the Chickasaw and the state of Virginia. This treaty was signed with Col. James Robertson on behalf of the colonists at French Lick. (Note: Piomingo concluded: "Peace is Now Settled, ... I was the first to propose it, ... & AM in hope No more Blood [may be] Shed by Either party.") Piomingo and Mingo-houma (Note: Mingo-houma, or "Red King"; the red king of a tribe was generally the war chief, or skiagusta. Ming-Houma claimed supreme "kingship'" over the Chickasaw.) represented the Chickasaw in November 1783, signing a treaty that gave up a large parcel of land at the juncture of Illinois, Kentucky, and Tennessee in exchange for U.S. help to evict a squatting tribe of Delaware Indians below Muscle Shoals that then would be set aside for the federal government's use, at a price. (Note: A cession later affirmed in the Treaty at Hopewell Plantation in 1786.) Mingo-Houma at that time considered himself to be the war chief of all Chickasaws.

=== Friendship with Washington ===
Piomingo strove to become closer to the expanding United States and its technological advances, sometimes to the detriment of relationships with other Chickasaw chiefs and allied Native American tribes such as the Choctaw and Cherokee. John Quincy Adams observed this during Piomingo's diplomatic visit with Washington, and recorded in his diary that:

"...the two leaders sat together and shared 'a large East Indian pipe' that Washington had arranged to have..." –John Q. Adams (Note: Piominko was unfamiliar with this ritual, as Washington had apparently thought smoking the peace pipe was a universal ceremony among Native Americans.)

Piomingo developed and cultivated a friendship with President George Washington. Letters, written by Washington, recognized his importance to the United States and its continued expansion west, as the Spanish actively sought rights to the Chickasaw lands, and had split the Chickasaw tribes loyalties in half. Creek leader, Alexander McGillivray, who with Spanish help was trying to build a pan-Indian confederation to confront America, thought him a traitor to all Native Americans.

=== Major treaty signer and ally ===
Along with Lotapaia and head white chief, Taski Etoka, Piomingo signed the Treaty at Hopewell plantation in South Carolina in January 1786. The treaty pledged both parties to peace and everlasting friendship. It also set and formalized the Chickasaw boundaries with the United States. Piominko, who became head war chief of the Chickasaw while at the signing when news of Red King's death reached him, never wavered from his decision to align his tribe to the U.S., even though the Federal government didn’t always live up to its side of the deal.

In a letter to President Washington dated October 30, 1789, Piomingo implores the government to help re-supply his tribe with bullets and gun powder to help him prepare for possible hostilities as escalating tensions with the Creek (Note: The Creek were also antagonistic with the United States frontiersmen at this time.) caused him concern with expected military confrontations following the next Spring thaw. In 1792—at Washington's behest—Piomingo received a Peace Medal from Secretary of War Henry Knox for his tribe's friendship with the United States.

== Legacy ==
Lake Piomingo in Mississippi is named for him. There is a statue of Piomingo in Tupelo, Mississippi, in a region close to the historic Chickasaw settlements.

Having often traveled to the northeast from Mississippi territory through the Tennessee territory to meet with Washington or his representatives, Piomingo repeatedly followed the same indian trail through the wilderness. The trail was known as 'Piomingo's Path' or 'Mountain Leader's Trace'. After his death, this route became known as the Old Natchez Trace.

His likeness was reported to possibly be the figurehead that adorned the late eighteenth-century merchant vessel, the US William Penn, at its launching.

== See also ==
- Tishomingo
