= United South and Eastern Tribes =

United South and Eastern Tribes, Inc. (USET) is an inter-tribal, non-profit organization representing federally recognized tribes in the Eastern and Southern United States. Founded in 1968 by four Southeastern tribes, its mission is to promote unity, expand political clout, and assist member tribes in negotiations with the federal government.

Originally named United Southeastern Tribes, the organization expanded to include northeastern tribes and adopted its current name in 1978. As of 2022, USET represents 33 tribal nations. The organization provides advocacy and services to its members in areas including public health, environmental planning, and historic preservation, and it has assisted tribes in the federal acknowledgment process.

== History ==
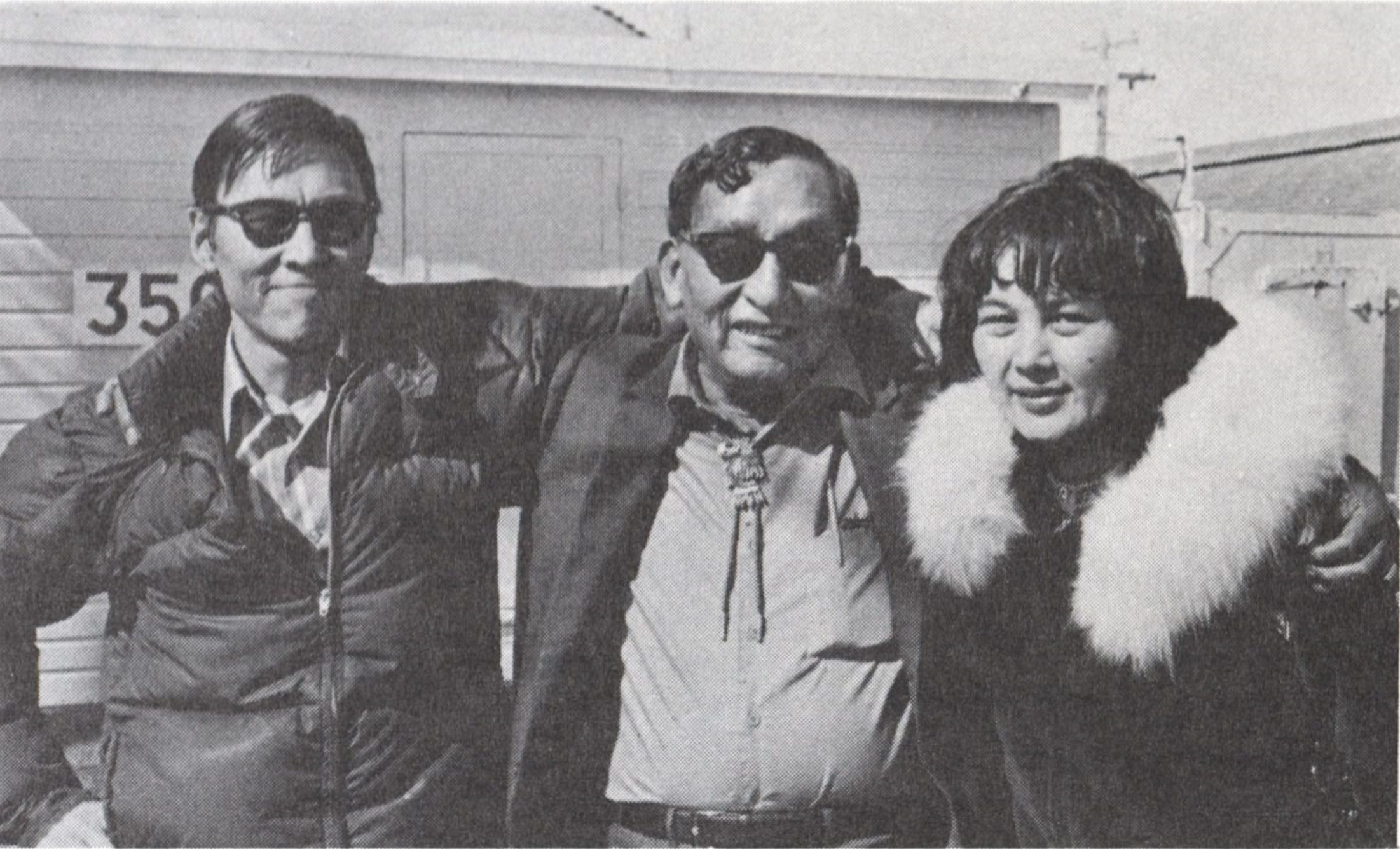
USET president Emmett York (center) with Alaska Federation of Natives board members Joseph Upicksoun (left) and Frances Degnan (right) in Utqiagvik, Alaska, to discuss the Alaska Native Claims Settlement Act in 1971.

United South and Eastern Tribes (USET) was founded in 1968 by the four federally recognized tribes in the Southeast at that time, the Eastern Band of Cherokee Indians, the Mississippi Band of Choctaw Indians, the Miccosukees, and the Seminoles. Betty Mae Tiger Jumper founded USET, a group to run health and education programs for its members; it also became a powerful lobby with the states and Congress. The Choctaws were among the founders, recognizing a shared "affinity of interests" with other Southeastern Indians. The organization was originally named United Southeastern Tribes.

The organization later expanded to include northeastern tribes. In 1978, its name was changed to United South and Eastern Tribes to reflect this expansion of membership beyond the South. Other tribes joined as they acquired or had their federal recognition restored, including the Alabama–Coushatta Tribe of Texas, Catawba, Chitimachas, and Coushattas whose recognition was terminated in the 1950s and restored after 1970, and the Poarch Band of Creek Indians, Tunica-Biloxi, and Jena Choctaws recognized under the 1978 process.

Membership in USET, along with the Coalition of Eastern Native Americans (CENA), has been described as "singularly important" for tribes in the federal acknowledgment process, with members being "overwhelmingly successful." Several tribes, including the Catawba, Mashantucket Pequot Tribe, Narragansett, and Mohegan Tribe, had overlapping membership in both USET and CENA. A Poarch tribal leader stated that a primary purpose of the organizations was for tribes to support one another in the acknowledgment process by sharing information and securing grants.

== Structure and membership ==
USET is an inter-tribal council and nonprofit organization. As of 2003, USET consisted of 24 member tribes located from Maine to Texas. These members were, Alabama-Coushatta Tribe of Texas, Aroostook Band of Micmac Indians, Catawba Indian Nation, Cayuga Nation, Chitimacha Tribe of Louisiana, Coushatta Tribe of Louisiana, Eastern Band of Cherokee, Houlton Band of Maliseet Indians, Jena Band of Choctaw Indians, Mashantucket Pequot Tribe, Miccosukee Tribe of Florida, Mississippi Band of Choctaw, Mohegan Tribe of Connecticut, Narragansett Indian Tribe, Oneida Indian Nation, Passamaquoddy Tribe - Indian Township, Passamaquoddy Tribe - Pleasant Point, Penobscot Indian Nation, Poarch Band of Creek Indians, Seminole Tribe of Florida, Seneca Nation of Indians, St. Regis Band of Mohawk Indians, Tunica-Biloxi Indians of Louisiana, Wampanoag Tribe of Gay Head (Aquinnah).

By 2013, membership was reported as 25 or 26 tribes. As of 2022, USET represents 33 eastern tribal nations.

The organization meets approximately once per year. These meetings, such as one held in Houston, Texas, serve as a forum for member tribes to discuss their problems and receive help in resolving them.

== Advocacy ==
=== Health ===
USET collaborates with the Nashville area Office of the Indian Health Service (IHS) on an epidemiology program. The USET Tribal Epidemiology Center assists member tribes with the development of tribal-specific health data.

In 2013, the USET Diabetes Program reported that the age-adjusted diabetes prevalence rate in the Nashville area of 22.6 percent was significantly higher than the rate for the entire IHS which was 11.4 percent and the total U.S. population, 6.4 percent. In 2014, the USET Tribal Epidemiology Center reported that the average age of death for all Nashville area tribes was 59.

In 2010, the USET Tribal Epidemiology Center received funding from the Robert Wood Johnson Foundation to create an internet-based data portal for reporting community health data. This portal provides members with community-comparative health statistics to help profile communities and address public health concerns.

=== Environment and climate change ===
USET provides services, funding, and knowledge sharing to its members related to environmental planning. It hosts tribal environmental conferences for its partners to share best practices and works to secure federal funding for intertribal climate actions. USET's participation in the Fall 2021 U.S. Environmental Protection Agency Tribal Environmental Conference for Region 1 was noted as an example of tribal-governmental partnership for environmental resilience in the eastern U.S.

USET was one of only three entities from the eastern region to be among the top 50 recipients of the Bureau of Indian Affairs (BIA) Tribal Climate Resilience Grant. The organization was the eighth-largest recipient overall, receiving $952,764, demonstrating its success in using regional unity to secure government funding.

=== Historic preservation ===
In 2003, USET submitted formal comments to the Federal Communications Commission (FCC) regarding the Nationwide Programmatic Agreement (NPA) for the Section 106 National Historic Preservation Act review process. In its comments, USET expressed concern that the FCC had failed for over a decade to comply with federal law requiring consultation with tribal governments before the construction of cell towers.

USET asserted that its member tribes "do not and will not" engage in government-to-government consultation with private entities, such as the cell tower licensees. This position was informed by a previous negotiation, around 2001, with a communications industry association. USET developed a set of protocols based on those negotiations, but after many months was informed that the industry group was no longer interested. USET concluded from this experience that direct FCC participation is "vital" to ensure the tribal voice is heard.

In its 2003 submission, USET proposed an "Alternative B," which it had developed in discussion with non-USET tribes. This alternative was designed to place tribes "at the center of the process" for identifying and evaluating properties of religious and cultural significance. A primary provision of Alternative B was a cost recovery mechanism, allowing a tribe to recover its costs for processing an applicant's request before issuing a certification letter. USET noted that it did not support "excessive cost recovery" and, to ensure fairness, supported a "reasonableness test" or a cost schedule mirroring private-sector costs.

USET cited its previous successful negotiations, such as a Memorandum of Agreement with the Mississippi National Guard to protect a tribal sacred site on a tank training range, as evidence that tribal concerns can be addressed without undermining an agency's mission.
