= Victoria Holland =

Cherokee attorney and politician

Tori Holland

Delegate to the U.S. House of Representatives from the United Keetoowah Band of Cherokee Indians
- Not seated
- Assumed office 2021
- Preceded by: Constituency established

Personal details
- Born: Tahlequah, Oklahoma, U.S.
- Education: Northeastern State University (BA); University of Oklahoma (JD)

Victoria "Tori" Holland (née Proctor) is a Native American attorney, politician, and activist. She is delegate-designate to the U.S. House of Representatives from the United Keetoowah Band of Cherokee Indians.

Holland was born in Tahlequah, Oklahoma.

She attended Northeastern State University and graduated from the University of Oklahoma College of Law.

In her work as an attorney with Devol & Associates, she has advocated for various Oklahoma tribes, including the Comanche Nation.

In 2021, she was selected by the UKB as a congressional delegate, arguing they hold the same rights as the Cherokee Nation and Eastern Band of Cherokee Indians to do so.

Holland has a husband and children who are Cherokee Nation citizens.

== See also ==
- List of Native Americans in the United States Congress
- Native American women in politics

U.S. House of Representatives
New constituency	Delegate-designate of the U.S. House of Representatives from the United Keetoowah Band of Cherokee Indians; 2021–present	Incumbent
