= United Keetoowah Band of Cherokee Indians =

Federally recognized Cherokee tribe based in Oklahoma

United Keetoowah Band of Cherokee Indians ᎠᏂᎩᏚᏩᎩ ᎠᏂᏴᏫᏯ
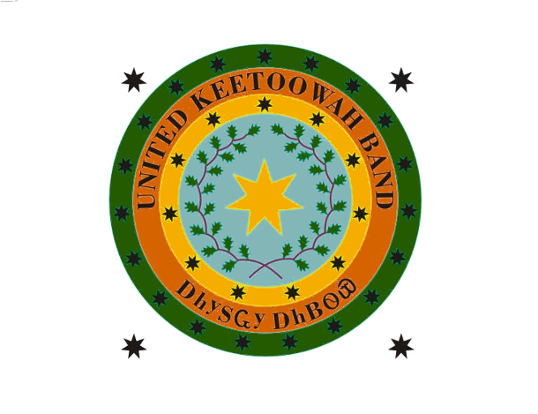
- Flag of the United Keetoowah Band of Cherokee Indians

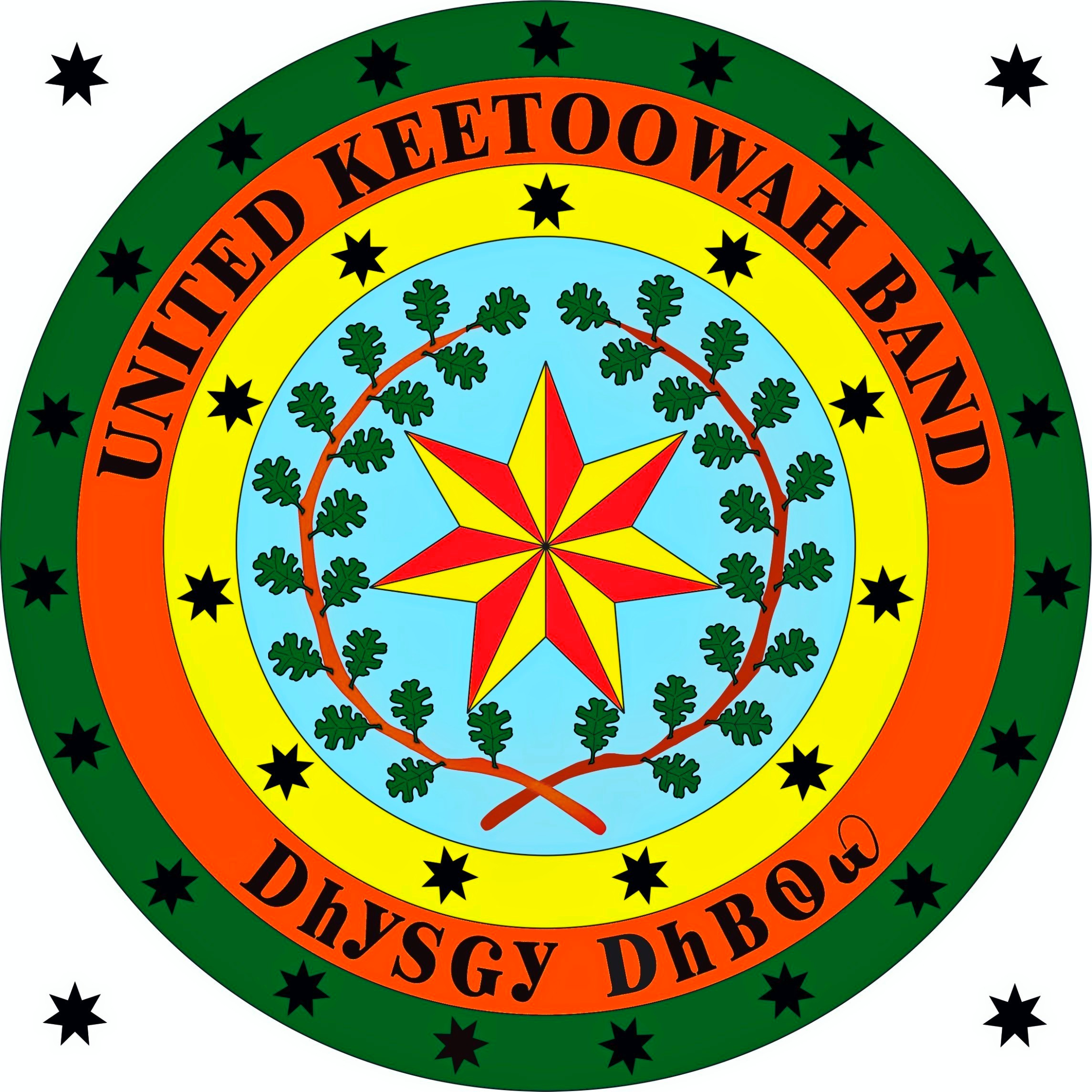
- Seal of the United Keetoowah Band of Cherokee Indians

Total population
- As of 2025 more than 14,000

Regions with significant populations
- United States (Oklahoma)

Languages
- English, Cherokee

Religion
- Christianity (Southern Baptist), Kituwah, Four Mothers Society

Related ethnic groups
- other Cherokee tribes

The United Keetoowah Band of Cherokee Indians in Oklahoma (ᎠᏂᎩᏚᏩᎩ ᎠᏂᏴᏫᏯ or Anigiduwagi Aniyvwiya, abbreviated United Keetoowah Band or UKB) is a federally recognized tribe of Cherokee Native Americans headquartered in an area just west of Tahlequah, Oklahoma. According to the UKB website, its members are mostly descendants of "Old Settlers" or "Western Cherokees," those Cherokees who migrated from the Southeast to present-day Arkansas and Oklahoma around 1817. Some reports estimate that Old Settlers began migrating west by 1800, before the forced relocation of Cherokees by the United States in the late 1830s under the Indian Removal Act.

Although politically the UKB is not associated with the Trail of Tears, many of the members have direct ancestors who completed the journey in 1838-39.

== Government ==
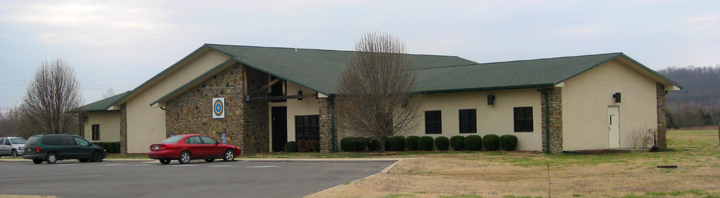
UKB Tribal Complex, West Willis Road, Tahlequah

Today the UKB has over 14,300 citizens, with 13,300 living within the state of Oklahoma. Jeff Wacoche is the current Chief.

As of 2025, the current administration is:

- Chief: Jeff Wacoche
- Assistant Chief: Amos Ketcher
- Secretary: Caleb Grimmett-Smith
- Treasurer: Sonja Gourd
- Cooweescoowee District Representative: Clifford Wofford
- Delaware District Representative: Tishaleta Guevara
- Flint District Representative: Frankie Still
- Goingsnake District Representative: Willie Christie
- Illinois District Representative: Fanelle Adair
- Saline District Representative: Charles Smoke
- Sequoyah District Representative: Donald Adair
- Tahlequah District Representative: Sammy Allen

Tribal officers hold four-year terms while tribal district representatives are elected to two-year terms. The election calendars parallel the United States' national election calendar (Mid-terms and Presidential).

== Economic development ==
The tribe owns and operates Keetoowah Construction in Tahlequah and the Keetoowah Cherokee Treatment Center in Tulsa, Oklahoma. They have an arts and crafts gallery which showcases United Keetoowah Band citizens' work.

They owned and operated the Keetoowah Cherokee Casino in Tahlequah from 1986 to 2013. The UKB issue their own tribal vehicle tags. Their estimated annual economic impact is $267 million. They host an annual homecoming festival over the first weekend of October.

== Origins ==
The word Keetoowah (Kituwa) is the name of an ancient Cherokee mother town and earthwork mound in the eastern homeland of the Cherokees. Kituwah also is considered by Cherokees to be their original name. The UKB's original land claims include all or parts of Alabama, the Carolinas, Georgia, Kentucky, Tennessee, Virginia, and West Virginia. Following the western movement of the Cherokees, UKB traditional territories include the above-mentioned states with the addition of Arkansas, Illinois, Kansas, Missouri, Oklahoma, and Texas.

== History ==
The UKB members are composed primarily of descendants of the "Old Settlers," Cherokees who settled in present-day Arkansas and Oklahoma around 1817. They were well established before most of the Cherokees were forcibly relocated by the United States government from the Southeast to Indian Territory in what became known as the 1838 Trail of Tears.

By the 1880s, all Cherokee people faced increased pressure by the US government for assimilation. During the late 19th and early 20th centuries, Cherokees and other Native American children were sent to Indian boarding schools away from home for their education: they were expected to speak only English, were generally prohibited from speaking their own languages, and were expected to adopt Christianity rather than practice native spirituality. The US federal government unilaterally closed and seized Cherokee and other Native American governmental and public institutions through the 1898 Curtis Act, the Dawes Act and the 1906 Five Civilized Tribes Act. Under this legislation, they broke up communal tribal holdings and allotted plots of land to individual households, intended to be developed according to the European-American model of subsistence farming.

The Dawes Commission was tasked to extinguish Native American land claims and break up tribal governments by allotting what was considered communal tribal lands. By assigning plots to individual households among the Five Civilized Tribes, they intended to encourage the European-American model of subsistence farming. Afterward the US government appointed certain Cherokee chiefs to administer tribal lands and holdings, rather than allowing the people to continue with their practice of hereditary chiefs.

== History of Federal recognition ==
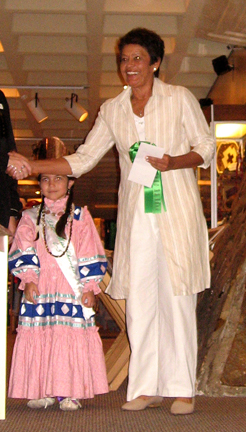
Virginia Stroud, enrolled UKB member, accepts an award for her artwork, Cherokee Heritage Center, Park Hill, Oklahoma, 2007

Under the Curtis Act of 1898, the government of the Cherokee Nation was intended to be dissolved in 1906, in spite of the resistance of many of its members. However, the Five Tribes Act of 1906 provided "the tribal existence and present tribal governments of [the Five Tribes] are hereby continued in full force and effect for all purposes authorized by law," leaving behind a weakened government. The only remnant left was the office of the Principal Chief, held by William Charles Rogers. He had been deposed in 1905 by the National Council for cooperating in the tribe's dissolution. He was replaced with Frank J. Boudinot (who was also the leader of the Keetoowah Nighthawk Society).

The next year, the US government re-appointed Rogers and directed him to manage land sales. He held office until 1914. After that the US government did not appoint a chief and the position was dormant.

Prior to World War II, the administration of President Franklin D. Roosevelt worked to strengthen Native American tribes by encouraging them to reconstitute their governments and adopt an electoral process. Congress passed the Indian Reorganization Act (1934). The state legislature passed the Oklahoma Indian Welfare Act (OIWA, 1936); both were considered part of the Indian New Deal to support tribes' reorganizing their governments. Cherokees began to organize on their own terms. In the meantime, the President of the United States officially appointed Principal Chiefs for the Cherokees; these appointments were made through the Department of Interior's Bureau of Indian Affairs.

The UKB ratified their constitution and by-laws on October 3, 1950. The tribe was federally recognized in 1950 under the Oklahoma Indian Welfare Act. Early elected leaders of the UKB were Levi Gritts, followed by John Hitcher, and the Reverend Jim Pickup, who served in the post-World War II era.

== Cherokee language ==
The UKB have struggled to maintain use and education in the Cherokee language. As of 2018, only 101 people in the UKB were counted as being fluent, with most speakers either in the grandparent generation or older. (Note: Ethnologue, as of 2018, classifies Cherokee as moribund (8a), which means that "The only remaining active users of the language are members of the grandparent generation and older".) In 2019, the Tri-Council of Cherokee tribes declared a state of emergency for the language due to the threat of it going extinct, and called for the enhancement of revitalization programs.

== Conflict with the Cherokee Nation of Oklahoma ==
After the intended federal dissolution of the Old Cherokee Nation under the Dawes Commission and allotments, Native American land claims in Indian Territory were extinguished and Oklahoma was admitted as a state. Indians listed on the Dawes Commission rolls and other rolls were effectively left without political representation. However, a 1906 Act of Congress officially continued the Cherokee Nation in limited form. Whether the modern Cherokee Nation is the continuation of the Old Cherokee Nation is a point of contention between it and the UKB.

In the late 1940s, the United Keetoowah Band's claim to recognition as a tribe was probed according to criteria influenced by John Collier, who led the Bureau of Indian Affairs, and Felix S. Cohen. Writer D'Arcy McNickle argued that the Cherokee Nation no longer existed in any form except to sign over Indian lands. He suggested that the UKB be granted federal acknowledgment based on its authenticity and connection to the traditional ways, including maintenance of the language and ceremonies.

After 1947, the UKB was the federally recognized organization by which all the Cherokee people received federal assistance and were dealt with on federal programs. The UKB was able to secure federal funds for the Cherokee Nation Complex, which today houses the government of the Cherokee Nation of Oklahoma (CNO), also federally recognized in the late 20th century. The UKB also started the Cherokee National Holiday, in conjunction with the Principal Chief's office. The Cherokee Nation Housing Authority was begun using UKB's federally recognized status.

Even the casino enterprises, which have for decades given the Cherokee Nation of Oklahoma a motive to try to destroy or "de-recognize" the UKB and its membership, emerged from precedent set by the cooperation of the UKB.

The Cherokee Nation received approval of their constitution and federal recognition in 1975. The two nations pursued independent paths; the CNO had many more members and asserted political power in the region. The CNO evicted the UKB from the offices at the tribal complex in Tahlequah, which had originally been acquired through the United Keetoowah Band's government-to-government relationship with the United States.

The CNO administrations of Wilma Mankiller and Chad "Corntassel" Smith have had many conflicts with UKB leadership. Smith was a member of the UKB, but due to these issues, the tribe revoked his membership in 2005.

== UKB membership ==
The United Keetoowah Band maintains a one-quarter-blood requirement for members. It requires all members to have verifiable Cherokee descent either from a person or people on the Dawes Rolls or the UKB Base Roll of 1949.

Beginning in the 1970s, the UKB made some people honorary, adopted and associate members, to recognize their services to the nation. This continued an older practice of Keetoowah adoption or naturalization of captives and friends dating to the 19th century. Former President Bill Clinton is a notable associate member. Given the problems in the 21st century of persons trying to gain benefits by claiming distant Cherokee or UKB ancestry, the tribe no longer practices honorary membership.

Ward Churchill, a former Professor of Ethnic Studies at the University of Colorado, had long claimed to be of Cherokee descent and made his reputation on promoting Native American issues and an activist Native American view. He was revealed to have no such ancestry. Then he claimed to be an honorary associate member in the UKB, but the tribe has rejected this claim as fraudulent.

== Legal issues ==
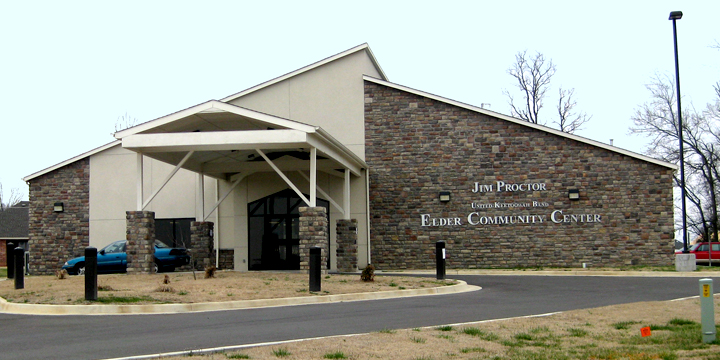
UKB Jim Proctor Elder Community Center, Tahlequah

=== Gaming casinos ===
In the late 20th century, several tribes began to develop gaming facilities on their own sovereign or trust lands, and in consultation with affected states. Such enterprises have raised revenues often used for development and welfare.

The State of Oklahoma has sued the UKB in federal court for operating what it describes as illegal gaming facilities, as they are not on Bureau of Indian Affairs-approved tribal trust lands. According to briefs submitted by the Cherokee Nation, the UKB own no tribal lands in federal trust. The lawsuit is pending in the federal courts in Oklahoma. It has been remanded to the National Indian Gaming Commission for review.

During the State of Oklahoma lawsuit pertaining to the UKB's alleged illegal casino operations for a casino that the tribe has been operating for approximately 19 years, the UKB was accused of attempting to sue the Cherokee Nation. The Cherokee Nation said the UKB had sued to demand cession of tribal land allotments to them in order to build casinos. These lawsuits were dismissed.

=== Land claims ===
The UKB has sued the United States for a share of the proceeds under HR-3534, a bill that required the United States to compensate the Cherokee Nation and two other Oklahoma tribes for claims to the disclaimed drybed lands of the Arkansas River. The legislation set aside ten percent of each tribe's share of the settlement for other claimant tribes; it afforded other claimant tribes an opportunity to file claims within 180 days of the legislation. The UKB filed suit against the United States in the Court of Claims. The Cherokee Nation moved to intervene and to dismiss the UKB suit. It contended that the Cherokee Nation is an indispensable party and that it cannot be joined in the litigation because of its sovereign immunity. The Court of Claims granted both of the Cherokee Nation's motions.

On April 14, 2006, on appeal, the United States sided with the UKB against the Cherokee Nation's request for dismissal. The Court of Federal Claims heard the appeal on November 8, 2006.

In June 2004, the UKB requested that the BIA take into trust land which the tribe owned on a fee basis, a 76-acre (31 ha) Community Services Parcel. The case has been studied and the request was originally denied, but the UKB appealed. In May 2011, the BIA finally announced its decision to take into trust for the UKB 76 acres (31 ha) of land in Tahlequah. This land includes several of its community centers and the sacred dance ground. The tribe will no longer be landless.

== Notable UKB members ==
- Robert J. Conley (1940–2014), historian and novelist
- Mel Cornshucker (born 1952), ceramic artist
- David Cornsilk (born 1959), legal activist and genealogist
- Cecil Dick (1915–1992), Flatstyle painter and muralist
- Franklin Gritts (1914–1996), Flatsyle painter and educator
- Victoria Holland, attorney and congressional delegate-designate
- Archie Sam (1914–1986), Natchez/Cherokee/Muscogee Creek traditionalist, stomp dance leader, and cultural historian
- Virginia Stroud (born 1951), (United Keetoowah Band/Muscogee Creek), artist and former Miss Indian America

== Education ==
In April, 2019, the tribe chartered Bacone College in Muskogee, Oklahoma as its tribal college.

== See also ==
- Original Keetoowah Society
- Cherokee Immersion School
