= National Register of Historic Places listings in Broward County, Florida =

Location of Broward County in Florida

This is a list of the National Register of Historic Places listings in Broward County, Florida.

This is intended to be a complete list of the properties and districts on the National Register of Historic Places in Broward County, Florida, United States. The locations of National Register properties and districts for which the latitude and longitude coordinates are included below, may be seen on a map.

There are 40 properties and districts listed on the National Register in the county. Another property was once listed but has been removed.

This National Park Service list is complete through NPS recent listings posted March 21, 2025.

Contents: Counties in Florida (non-linked contain no National Register listings)
Alachua - Baker - Bay - Bradford - Brevard - Broward - Calhoun - Charlotte - Citrus - Clay - Collier - Columbia - DeSoto - Dixie - Duval - Escambia - Flagler - Franklin - Gadsden - Gilchrist - Glades - Gulf - Hamilton - Hardee - Hendry - Hernando - Highlands - Hillsborough (Tampa) - Holmes - Indian River - Jackson - Jefferson - Lafayette - Lake - Lee - Leon - Levy - Liberty - Madison - Manatee - Marion - Martin - Miami-Dade (Miami) - Monroe - Nassau - Okaloosa - Okeechobee - Orange - Osceola - Palm Beach - Pasco - Pinellas - Polk - Putnam - St. Johns - St. Lucie - Santa Rosa - Sarasota - Seminole - Sumter - Suwannee - Taylor - Union - Volusia - Wakulla - Walton - Washington

== Current listings ==
	Name on the Register	Image	Date listed	Location	City or town	Description
1	Bonnet House	Bonnet House	July 5, 1984 (#84000832)	900 Birch Road; 26°08′07″N 80°06′20″W	Fort Lauderdale	A winter retreat built in 1920 by Frederic Clay Bartlett.
2	Bryan Building	Bryan Building	October 30, 1997 (#97001282)	220-230 Brickell Avenue; 26°07′08″N 80°08′40″W	Fort Lauderdale	One of the first hotels in Fort Lauderdale's original downtown district, and one of the first commercial buildings built after a 1912 fire in the city. Housed the law office of Ennis Shepherd, a city judge and attorney, from 1947 until the 1990s.
3	James D. and Alice Butler House	James D. and Alice Butler House	July 28, 1995 (#95000916)	380 East Hillsboro Boulevard; 26°19′04″N 80°05′56″W	Deerfield Beach	
4	Cap's Place	Cap's Place	August 10, 1990 (#90001227)	2980 Northeast 31st Avenue; 26°16′05″N 80°04′55″W	Lighthouse Point	
5	Council Oak Tree Site on the Hollywood Seminole Indian Reservation	Council Oak Tree Site on the Hollywood Seminole Indian Reservation	December 4, 2012 (#12000992)	intersection between U.S. 441 (State Road 7) and Stirling Rd; 26°02′44″N 80°12′35″W	Hollywood	
6	Croissant Park Administration Building	Croissant Park Administration Building	July 25, 2001 (#01000761)	1421 South Andrews Avenue; 26°06′11″N 80°08′36″W	Fort Lauderdale	
7	Davie School	Davie School	March 29, 1988 (#88000223)	6650 Griffin Road; 26°03′50″N 80°14′09″W	Davie	
8	Davie Woman's Club	Davie Woman's Club	May 16, 2016 (#16000267)	6551 SW. 45th St. 26°03′57″N 80°14′04″W	Davie	Part of Clubhouses of Florida's Woman's Clubs Multiple Property Submission
9	Deerfield Beach Elementary School	Deerfield Beach Elementary School	April 16, 1990 (#90000319)	651 Northeast 1st Street; 26°19′10″N 80°05′45″W	Deerfield Beach	
10	Fort Lauderdale Woman's Club	Fort Lauderdale Woman's Club	February 4, 2019 (#100003404)	20 S. Andrews Ave. 26°07′18″N 80°08′36″W	Fort Lauderdale	Part of Clubhouses of Florida's Woman's Clubs Multiple Property Submission
11	Sam Gilliam House	Sam Gilliam House	March 29, 2001 (#01000289)	11 Southwest 15th Street; 26°06′12″N 80°08′51″W	Fort Lauderdale	
12	Hammerstein House	Hammerstein House	February 15, 2005 (#05000051)	1520 Polk Street; 26°00′53″N 80°08′16″W	Hollywood	
13	Hillsboro Inlet Light Station	Hillsboro Inlet Light Station	February 16, 1979 (#79000661)	Off Interstate 95 at Hillsboro Inlet; 26°15′32″N 80°04′51″W	Pompano Beach	Completed in 1907, the lighthouse stands 142 feet tall (43.3 meters) and is one of the most powerful lighthouses in the world whose light can be seen at 28 nautical miles.
14	Hollywood Boulevard Historic Business District	Hollywood Boulevard Historic Business District	February 18, 1999 (#99000231)	Along Hollywood Boulevard, between 21st Avenue and Young Circle; 26°00′41″N 80°08′43″W	Hollywood	
15	Hollywood Garden Club	Hollywood Garden Club	February 15, 2005 (#05000052)	2940 Hollywood Boulevard; 26°00′43″N 80°10′06″W	Hollywood	
16	Hollywood Woman's Club	Hollywood Woman's Club	February 10, 1995 (#95000055)	501 North 14th Avenue; 26°00′55″N 80°08′03″W	Hollywood	
17	Dr. Willard Van Orsdel King House	Dr. Willard Van Orsdel King House	February 21, 2006 (#06000059)	1336 Seabreeze Boulevard; 26°06′18″N 80°06′31″W	Fort Lauderdale	
18	Link Trainer Building	Link Trainer Building	May 20, 1998 (#98000454)	4050 Southwest 14th Avenue; 26°04′16″N 80°09′34″W	Fort Lauderdale	The only remaining building of the original Fort Lauderdale Naval Air Station, it housed 6 link trainers to train World War II Pilots.
19	Lock No. 1, North New River Canal	Lock No. 1, North New River Canal	February 17, 1978 (#78000932)	South of Plantation on State Road 84; 26°05′39″N 80°13′46″W	Plantation	
20	Mai-Kai Restaurant	Mai-Kai Restaurant	November 18, 2014 (#14000951)	3599 N. Federal Hwy. 26°10′21″N 80°07′12″W	Oakland Park	
21	New River Inn	New River Inn	June 19, 1972 (#72000303)	229 Southwest 2nd Avenue; 26°07′09″N 80°08′51″W	Fort Lauderdale	
22	North Woodlawn Cemetery	North Woodlawn Cemetery	November 29, 2017 (#100001861)	1936 NW 9th St. 26°08′06″N 80°10′05″W	Fort Lauderdale	
23	Nyberg-Swanson House	Nyberg-Swanson House	May 28, 1999 (#99000583)	102 West Dania Beach Boulevard; 26°03′08″N 80°08′42″W	Dania Beach	
24	Oakland Park Elementary School	Oakland Park Elementary School	June 9, 1988 (#88000714)	936 Northeast Thirty-third Street; 26°10′04″N 80°08′07″W	Oakland Park	
25	Old Deerfield School	Old Deerfield School	May 5, 1999 (#99000525)	232 Northeast Second Street; 26°19′12″N 80°05′59″W	Deerfield Beach	
26	Old Dillard High School	Old Dillard High School	February 20, 1991 (#91000107)	1001 Northwest Fourth Street; 26°07′31″N 80°09′19″W	Fort Lauderdale	
27	Old Seaboard Air Line Railway Station	Old Seaboard Air Line Railway Station	April 5, 1990 (#90000597)	1300 West Hillsboro Boulevard; 26°19′02″N 80°07′22″W	Deerfield Beach	
28	Pompano Beach Mound	Pompano Beach Mound	April 17, 2014 (#14000151)	1232 SE. 13th St. 26°13′18″N 80°05′33″W	Pompano Beach	
29	Rivermont	Rivermont	April 20, 2022 (#100007619)	Address Restricted; 26°07′02″N 80°09′18″W	Fort Lauderdale	
30	St. Anthony School	St. Anthony School	September 26, 1997 (#97001171)	820 Northeast 3rd Street; 26°07′28″N 80°08′06″W	Fort Lauderdale	
31	Sample Estate	Sample Estate	March 1, 1984 (#84000834)	3161 North Dixie Highway; 26°16′11″N 80°06′57″W	Pompano Beach	House on the estate, known as the Sample-McDougald House, moved to new site
32	Sample-McDougald House	Sample-McDougald House	September 15, 2004 (#04000970)	450 Northeast 10th Street; 26°14′24″N 80°07′11″W	Pompano Beach	
33	South Side School	South Side School	July 19, 2006 (#06000617)	701 South Andrews Avenue; 26°05′46″N 80°08′38″W	Fort Lauderdale	
34	SS COPENHAGEN (shipwreck)	SS COPENHAGEN (shipwreck)	May 31, 2001 (#01000532)	Lauderdale-By-The-Sea Dropoff reef south of Hillsboro Inlet; 26°12′21″N 80°05′07″W	Lauderdale-By-The-Sea	
35	Stranahan House	Stranahan House	October 2, 1973 (#73000569)	335 Southeast 6th Avenue; 26°07′05″N 80°08′17″W	Fort Lauderdale	
36	Alfred and Olive Thorpe Lustron House	Alfred and Olive Thorpe Lustron House	November 1, 2007 (#07001114)	1001 Northeast 2nd Street; 26°07′34″N 80°07′59″W	Fort Lauderdale	A prefabricated Lustron house
37	Villa Providence	Villa Providence	December 24, 2013 (#13000962)	324 SW. 2nd Ave. 25°58′52″N 80°09′02″W	Hallandale Beach	
38	Old West Side Grade School	Old West Side Grade School	September 19, 2012 (#12000790)	301 Harmon Avenue; 26°07′07″N 80°09′32″W	Fort Lauderdale	
39	Williams House	Williams House	September 28, 2005 (#05001089)	119 Rose Drive; 26°06′37″N 80°08′30″W	Fort Lauderdale	
40	Joseph Wesley Young House	Joseph Wesley Young House	August 10, 1989 (#89001076)	1055 Hollywood Boulevard; 26°00′48″N 80°07′45″W	Hollywood	Designed by Rubush and Hunter in the 1920s, it was the house of Joseph W. Young, founder of Hollywood.

== Former listings ==
	Name on the Register	Image	Date listed	Date removed	Location	City or town	Description
1	Dr. Kennedy Homes Historic District	Dr. Kennedy Homes Historic District	April 6, 2011 (#11000179)	January 4, 2012	1004 W Broward Blvd; 26°07′17″N 80°09′18″W	Fort Lauderdale	All but three buildings demolished in late 2011.

== See also ==
- List of National Historic Landmarks in Florida
- National Register of Historic Places listings in Florida
