= Seminole Hard Rock Hotel and Casino =

Seminole Hard Rock Hotel and Casino may refer to:

- Seminole Hard Rock Hotel & Casino Hollywood, located near Miami, Florida
- Seminole Hard Rock Hotel and Casino Tampa, located in Tampa, Florida
- Hard Rock Cafe, a chain of theme restaurants and other interests owned by the Seminole Tribe of Florida
