= James F. Allen =

James F. Allen may refer to:

- James F. Allen (computer scientist) (born 1950), American computational linguist and academic
- James F. Allen (businessman) (born 1960), American businessman, chairman of Hard Rock International
