= James F. Allen (businessman) =

American businessman (born 1960)

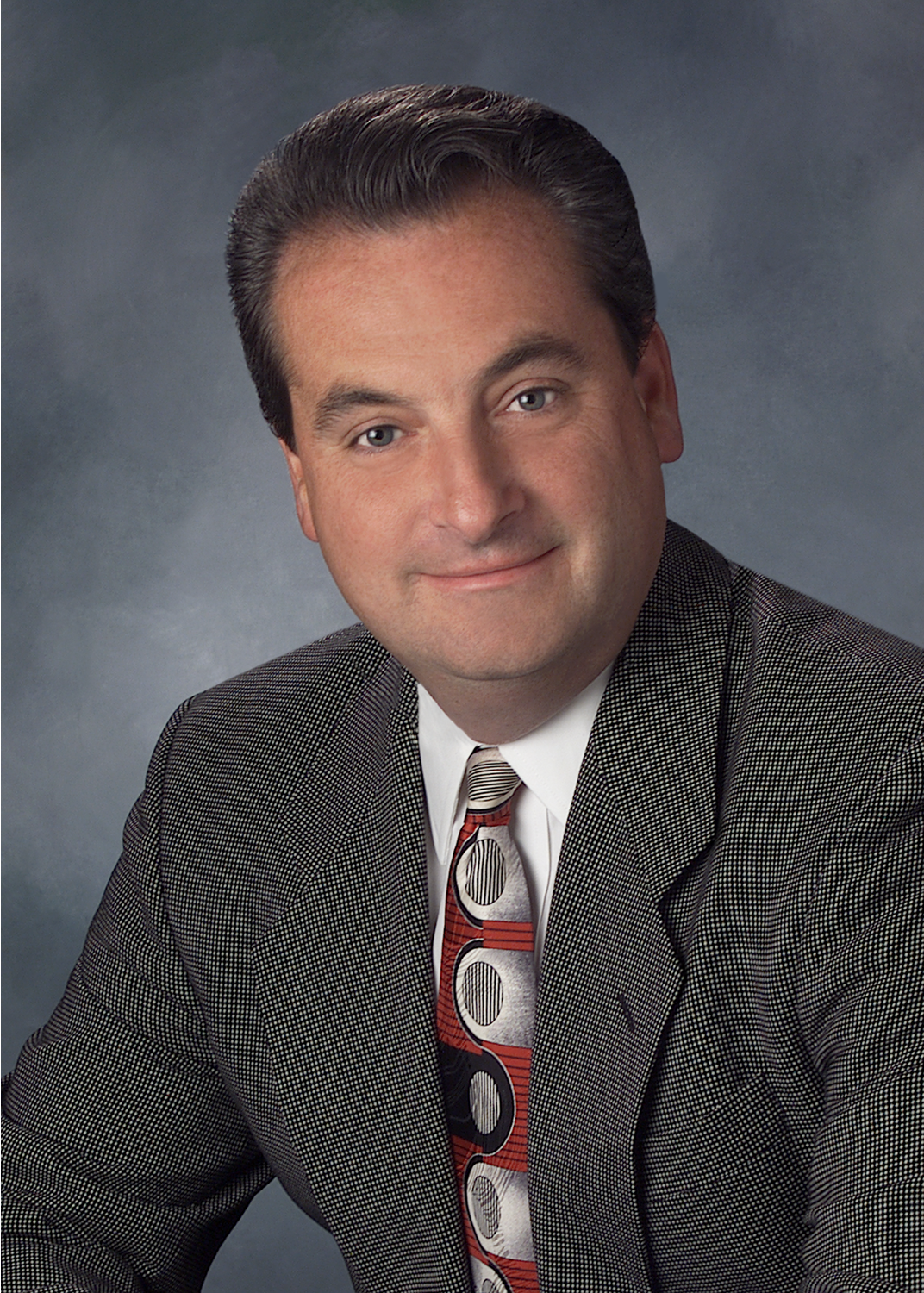
- Born: 1960 (age 65–66)
- Employers: Hard Rock International; Seminole Gaming
- Title: Chairman, Hard Rock International; CEO, Seminole Gaming; Chairman, Hard Rock Digital
- Board member of: American Gaming Association; Rock and Roll Forever Foundation; Seminole Hard Rock Winterfest Boat Parade

James F. Allen (born 1960) is an American businessman. Currently chairman of Hard Rock International, chief executive officer of Seminole Gaming, and chairman of Hard Rock Digital, previously, he was vice president of operations of The Trump Organization and senior vice president of Sol Kerzner's company, Sun International. A board member of the American Gaming Association, Allen was chair of the organization from 2022 to 2024.

== Early life and education ==
James Allen was born in 1960 to Robert C. and Kathryn Allen, and had a modest upbringing. He attended Mainland Regional High School in Linwood, New Jersey, graduating in 1978. Allen began working in restaurants at the age of 13.

Allen took career-development courses, including gaming classes at University of Nevada, Reno and creative writing and hotel management classes at Atlantic Cape Community College in Mays Landing, New Jersey.

== Career ==
=== 1979-2001: Early roles ===
Allen has worked in the casino, hotel, and gaming industries since 1979. His career began as a cook at Bally's Park Place in Atlantic City, New Jersey, where he has been credited with helping successfully implement data tracking software to balance profit and food costs. Via Bally's, he entered a management training program around 1980. In 1985, he joined Atlantic City Hilton as a purchasing manager.

Allen worked at The Trump Organization, which had taken over the Atlantic City Hilton, until 1993. He became part of the senior management team for three Trump properties in Atlantic City, before being promoted to vice president of operations. Allen next worked for real estate developer Christopher Hemmeter (Hemmeter Enterprises), as general manager for four Colorado casinos and helped to open another in New Orleans.

He was then hired by South African business magnate Sol Kerzner to be Mohegan Sun's senior vice president of property operations and help develop Atlantis Paradise Island. Allen was Kerzner's third hire, starting in 1995 and departing in 2001. He was promoted to senior vice president of property operations in Kerzner's company, Sun International, which included Mohegan Sun, Atlantis Paradise Island, and the Ocean Club and the former Desert Inn, Las Vegas.

Allen is a former member of the New Jersey Casino Control Commission Task Force on Gaming Regulation.

=== 2001-2020: Joining Seminole Gaming and Hard Rock ===
Allen is chairman of Hard Rock International (or Seminole Hard Rock Entertainment) and CEO of Seminole Gaming. Allen, who is not of Seminole origin, has led the Seminole Tribe of Florida's gaming operations since 2001. He was initially hired to operate five casinos on the Brighton, Coconut Creek, Hollywood, Immokalee, and Tampa reservations, and to develop the Seminole Hard Rock Hotel and Casino Hollywood and Seminole Hard Rock Hotel and Casino Tampa. Allen is credited with driving the 2003 development of bingo-based "Class II" gaming machines that are similar to slot machines. He has also been credited with leading the tribe's acquisition of Hard Rock International during 2006–2007 and for overseeing its brand, customer experience, image, memorabilia collection, and management practices.

Allen received a casino marketing lifetime achievement award in July 2016, at the Casino Marketing and Technology Conference, which was hosted by Casino Journal and its parent company BNP Media. The award was established in 2004 to recognize individuals who have made "outstanding contributions in the area of casino marketing, promotions and customer service". In March 2017, Allen led the Hard Rock International purchase of the Trump Taj Mahal from investor Carl Icahn. Allen had "played a major role" in opening the hotel and casino, which closed in 2016, and reopened the property as the Hard Rock Hotel & Casino Atlantic City in 2018.

In 2019, Allen was named a Business Hall of Fame Laureate by Junior Achievement of South Florida. He was honored as a 2020 inductee into the H. Wayne Huizenga College of Business and Entrepreneurship's Entrepreneur and Business Hall of Fame at Nova Southeastern University in Davie, Florida. By 2020, Allen had been credited with the Guitar Hotel expansion of the Seminole Hard Rock Hotel & Casino Hollywood, as well as the guestroom tower expansion of the Seminole Hard Rock Hotel & Casino Tampa.

=== 2021-2026: Recent years ===
As of 2021, Allen remained president and CEO of Seminole HR Holdings, as well as a member of the organization's board of managers. He also remained chair of Hard Rock International. Allen was described as "instrumental" in an April 2021 agreement between Florida Governor Ron DeSantis and tribal chairman Marcellus Osceola Jr., where the Seminoles agreed to pay the state $2.5 billion over five years "in exchange for having control over online sports betting throughout Florida." After joining the board of the American Gaming Association (AGA) in 2015, Allen was AGA chair from January 2022 until January 2024.

In September 2022, he directed the Hard Rock brand to invest $100 million in increasing wages for half of its non-management and non-tipped workers. Also in 2022, he led Hard Rock International's purchase of The Mirage on the Las Vegas Strip for $1.1 billion. The hotel remained open until 2024, when it was closed for redevelopment. Allen stated it would reopen as the Hard Rock Hotel and Guitar Hotel casino resort, likely in 2027. He was named a 2023 Unity Gala Honoree by the National Association of Minority Contractors, and in 2024, the American Gaming Association inducted him into their Gaming Hall of Fame. Also in 2024, he was given a Lifetime Achievement Award by the East Coast Gaming Congress (ECGC).

Remaining CEO and president of Seminole HR Holdings, in 2025, he signed an extension of his contract with the Seminoles for another five to seven years. By that point, he had overseen Seminole Gaming's growth to include 300 locations in 80 countries, with 60,000 employees. He had also overseen Hard Rock's expansion into sports, including a naming rights agreement for Hard Rock Stadium in Miami, and partnerships with the Miami Formula 1 Grand Prix and Oracle Red Bull Racing. With the World Cup soccer games of 2026 to be held at Hard Rock Stadium, Allen is on the event's Miami Host Committee board of directors. He has been a speaker at events such as the New Jersey Governor’s Business Development Conference, and on networks such as CNN, CNBC, Bloomberg, and Fox Business.

== Personal life ==
Allen resides in Fort Lauderdale, Florida. Allen as of 2022 was married to his wife Shelley.

In 2005, to commemorate Seminole Gaming's twenty-fifth anniversary, Allen directed a beautification of the tribe's Council Oak, the site of many Seminole Tribe ceremonial events.

Chairman from 2022 to 2024, he is on the American Gaming Association's board of directors and the advisory board of the Seminole Hard Rock Winterfest Boat Parade. He is also a board member of the Rock and Roll Forever Foundation.

== See also ==
- List of people from Fort Lauderdale, Florida
