= South Side School =

South Side School may refer to:

- South Side School (Sarasota, Florida), listed on the National Register of Historic Places (NRHP)
- South Side School (Fort Lauderdale, Florida), NRHP-listed
- South Side School (Geneseo, Illinois), NRHP-listed

== See also ==
- Southside High School (disambiguation), including places named "South Side High School"
