= Council Oak =

Council Oak may refer to:

- Council Oak Tree (Hollywood, Florida), located on the Hollywood Seminole Indian Reservation
- Creek Council Oak Tree, located in Tulsa, Oklahoma
- Council Oak, a tree used as a symbol for the University of Wisconsin–Eau Claire
- Council Oak, a tree that stood in Winameg, Ohio until 1992
