= Council Oak Tree (Hollywood, Florida) =

- Council Oak Tree Site on the Hollywood Seminole Indian Reservation
- U.S. National Register of Historic Places
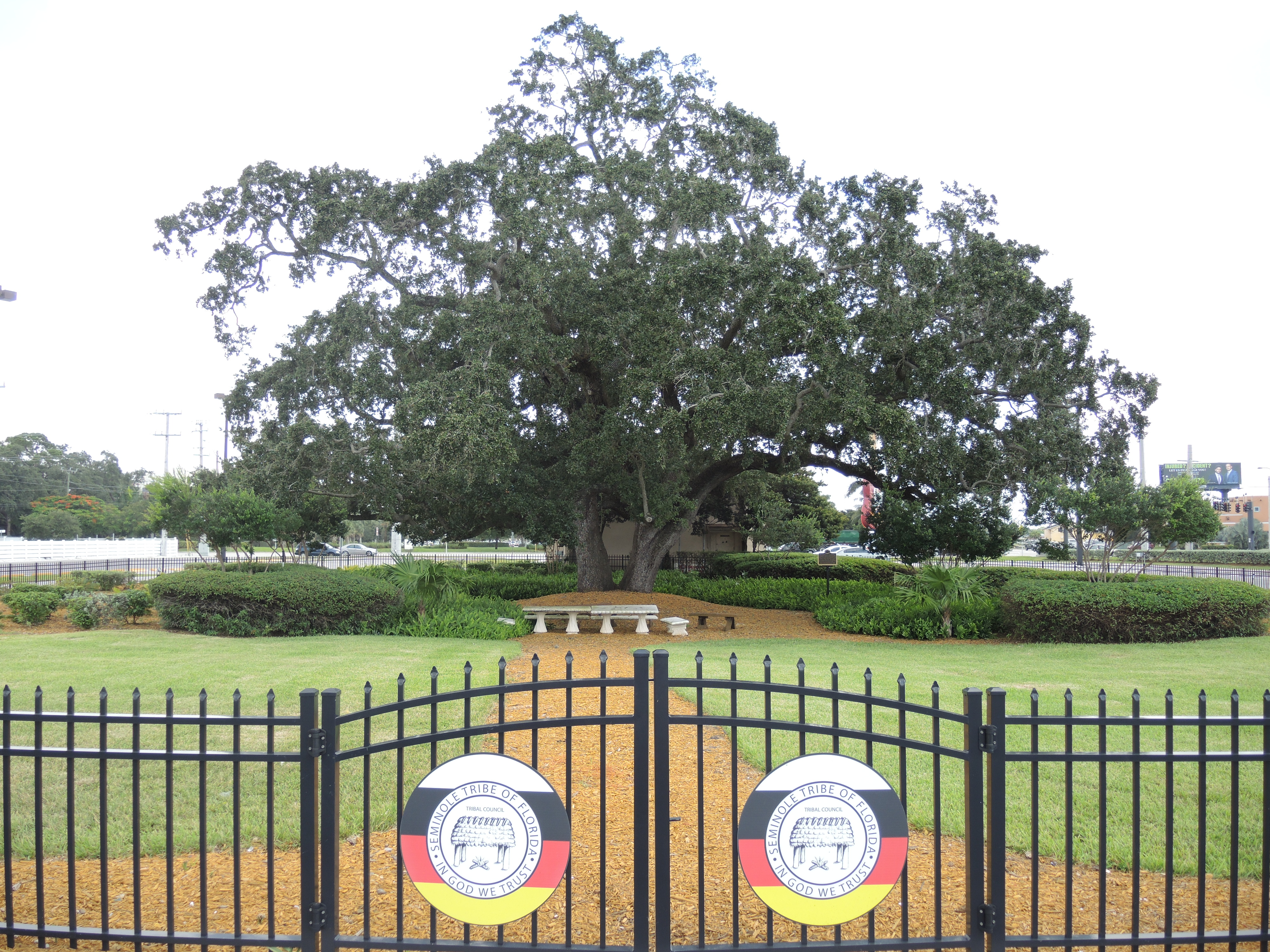
- Council Oak Tree Site on the Hollywood Seminole Indian Reservation

- Location within Florida Location within the United States
- Location: Hollywood, Florida
- Coordinates: 26.045686°N 80.209636°W
- NRHP reference No.: 12000992
- Added to NRHP: December 4, 2012

The Council Oak Tree is an historic oak tree on the Hollywood Seminole Indian Reservation in Hollywood, Florida, at the intersection between U.S. 441 (State Road 7) and Stirling Rd. It has been the site for many important events in the history of the Seminole Tribe of Florida since at least 1957. Some of the events in the early 21st century include the 25th Anniversary celebration for the birthplace of Indian gaming (2004), the Tribe's 50th Anniversary celebration (2007), and the signing of the Seminole Gaming Compact (2010). The tree's image serves as a tribal logo. A restaurant at both the Seminole Hard Rock Hotel & Casino Hollywood and Seminole Hard Rock Hotel and Casino Tampa is named for the Council Oak. The documents for the purchase of the hotel, casino and contents were signed under the Council Oak Tree. On December 4, 2012, it was added to the National Register of Historic Places as Council Oak Tree Site on the Hollywood Seminole Indian Reservation.

== See also ==
- List of individual trees
