= Hollywood Garden Club =

- U.S. National Register of Historic Places
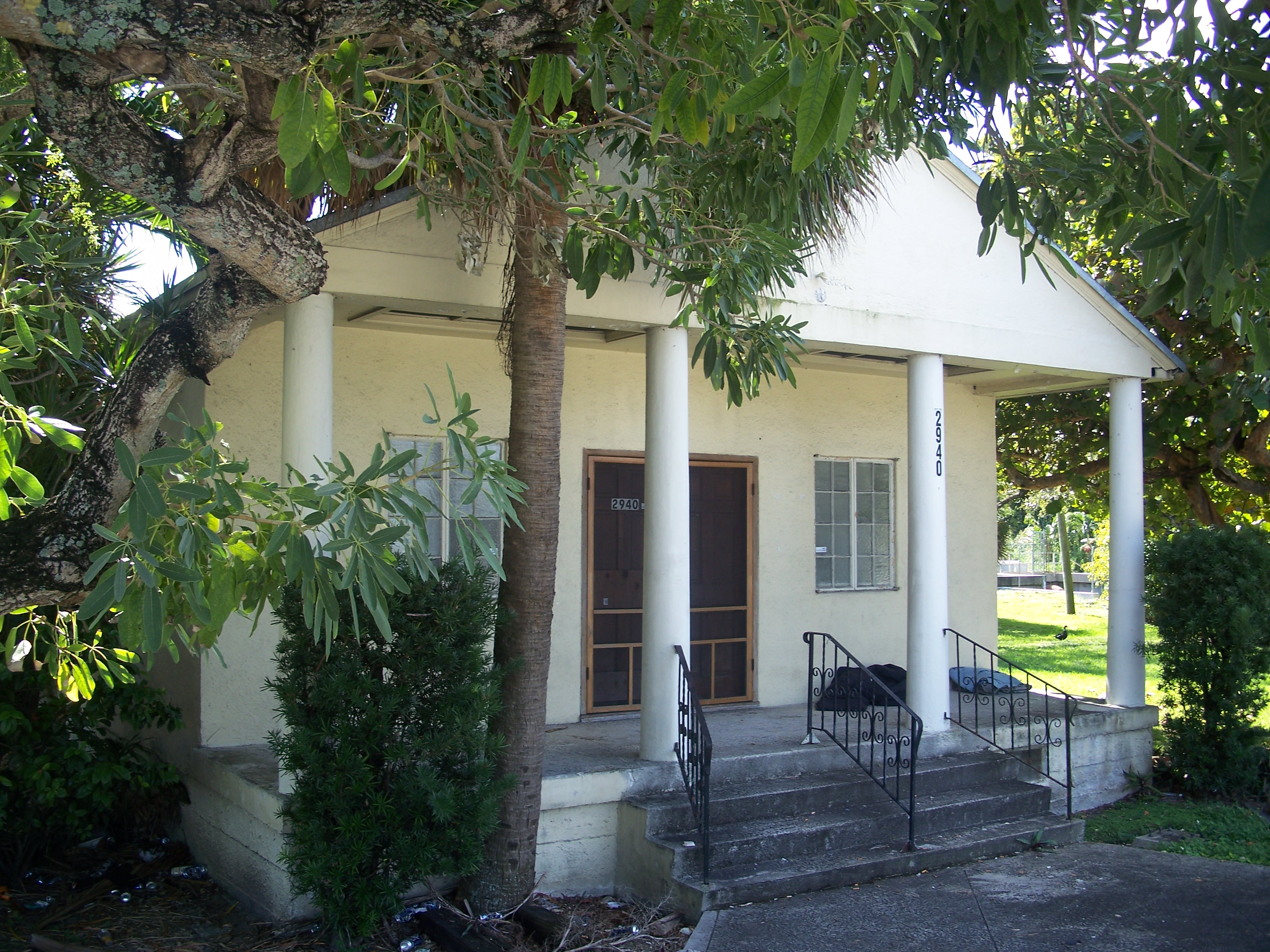

- Location within Florida Location within the United States
- Location: Hollywood, Florida
- Coordinates: 26°0′43″N 80°10′6″W
- NRHP reference No.: 05000052
- Added to NRHP: 15 February 2005

The Hollywood Garden Club, also known as the Sunday School House of First Church of Christ, Scientist, is a historic building in Hollywood, southeastern Florida. It is located at 2940 Hollywood Boulevard. It was built in 1927 and moved to its current location in 1959. In 1960, the garden club hosted the Seventh Annual Conservation Conference of the Florida Federation of Garden Clubs and in subsequent years engaged in numerous civic activities, such as beautification projects and anti-litter campaigns. On February 23, 1999, the four remaining members of the garden club deeded the building to the City of Hollywood. On February 15, 2005, it was added to the U.S. National Register of Historic Places.

== Building ==
The one story vernacular building was built in 1927 and has a low-pitched front gabled roof. The floor plan is rectangular. The approach is a curved concrete walk leading to the four steps to the entry porch. The incised porch spans the front face of the building is and is covered by a shallow simple pediment supported by four Tuscan columns. This shows the influence of Neoclassical architecture. The front elevation has a centered wood double six-panel door on either side are casement eight pane casement windows. The finish is the original medium-texture stucco.

The entry to the building featured a full-length vestibule common in religious buildings. The main space in the interior originally the nave is divided from the vestibule by a window wall reaching to less than two feet from the ceiling. The original cherry wood floors remain although currently covered by wall to wall carpet in the main room and laminate flooring in the entry remain in place. In addition to the main room there is a kitchen and a bathroom.

== Site ==
The building is located in a government use district. It is located directly south of the Hollywood Railroad Station across Hollywood Boulevard. The original setting when used by the First Church of Christ, Scientist was in an open lawn. After it was moved the members of the Hollywood Garden Club landscaped the site. As of 2005 there were ten large specimen trees, including a large Yellow tab over 50 years old. The garden club laid a concrete patio where club activities were conducted under the shade of a Pitch Apple tree.

== History ==
=== A church meeting house ===
Constructed at 1582 Harrison Street as the First Church of Christ, Scientist, it was the second building erected by the church in Hollywood. The first was destroyed very shortly after it was built by the 1926 hurricane. The Hollywood branch was recognized by The Mother Church in 1927 and the congregation rebuilt dedicating the building in 1932. During World War II, the congregation members played key roles in a program which provided clothing relief to war-ravaged European countries. Donated clothing was collected and new garments sewn. The building served as the church's meeting place until 1950 when the church built a larger building it was then used as a Sunday school. By 1959, the church sought to build another structure on the site.

=== The garden club ===
The building was donated (for a nominal fee) to the Hollywood Garden Club in 1959. On July 9 that year it was moved to its current location. The club had been in existence for thirty-two years but did not have a meeting place. Members lent the club $100 each to cover the cost of moving the building and installing it with electricity and plumbing. The building is historically significant because of the civic contributions of the garden club particularly when it served as the club's garden center building.

==== Civic activities ====
Garden club projects included conservation activism, anti-litter campaigns, community beautification projects and Arbor Day plantings. The greater membership encouraged and afforded by having the facility improved the clubs effectiveness in campaigns and improved their finances. The building and site allowed the garden club to substantially increase their civic activities. For forty years the building was the club's meeting place and repository for their archives. The Hollywood Garden Club engaged extensively in progressive civic activities until the 1970s when profession opportunities improved for women and membership in garden and similar clubs declined.

In 1960, the garden club hosted the Seventh Annual Conservation Conference of the Florida Federation of Garden Clubs (district 11). Among the uses of the club's funds were contributions to the Florida Federation of Garden Club's Wekiva Youth Camp. Located in Wekiwa Springs State Park in Apopka, Florida the youth camp provides a nature immersive experience for 3rd through 8th graders.

Newspaper articles from the 1950s describe the clubs involvement in rubbish removal and concealing trash areas. Litter bag giveaways, bumper stickers and a newspaper advertisement were among the clubs anti-litter activities by 1961. Club archives show participation of the local Sears store and their management in a number of club programs. This was likely a part of the Home and Neighborhood Development Sponsors program which started in 1957 and was nationally sponsored by the department store chain.

Club members devoted time and resources to the South Florida State Hospital Garden Therapy Program. The club was active in the garden therapy program for more than ten years. Having the facility helped the club grow plants and handle the logistics of their participation in the program. Garden therapy was a focus for the federation with greenhouses, books, plants and supplies provided to four institutions including, Riaford Prison and Lowell Prison for Women in Avon Park.

==== Final years ====
The Hollywood Garden Club formed on March 18, 1927. This was two years before the surviving national organization (National Garden Clubs). Club membership peaked at over 100 in 1960. The operated continuously from 1927 to 1999. In the 1990s membership fell to six and the club could no longer afford the insurance on the building.

== Modern times ==
On February 23, 1999, the four remaining members of the garden club deeded the building to the City of Hollywood. The proximity to the Historic Hollywood Railway Station lead to use of the building for railroad-related community organizations. In 2001 the building was utilized as the clubhouse, museum, and showroom of the Big Pine and Sawgrass Model Railroad Club. In 2005 it was functioning as an educational facility for railroad related programs administered by three nonprofit organizations; the Hollywood Railroad Station Museum, the Dorothy Walker Bush Museum and the Big Pine and Sawgrass Model Railroad Club. The Dorothy Walker Bush Museum never actually came to be as a museum, and the organizer was charged with multiple felonies and pled guilty to grand theft related to the abuse of state funds appropriated for the museum. The building no longer appears on street view of Google Maps.

== See also ==
- National Register of Historic Places listings in Broward County, Florida
