= Tampa Reservation =

- Indian reservation
- Location of Tampa Reservation
- Coordinates: 27°59′38″N 82°22′17″W
- Tribe: Seminole
- Country: United States
- State: Florida
- County: Hillsborough

Population (2002)
  - Total: 200
- Website: Seminole Tribe of Florida

The Tampa Reservation is one of six Seminole Indian reservations governed by the federally recognized Seminole Tribe of Florida. It is located in Hillsborough County, Florida.

== Economic development ==
The Seminole Hard Rock Hotel and Casino Tampa is located on the reservation in Tampa, Florida, as well as the Hard Rock Cafe, Green Room, and a food court.

== History ==
Tampa Reservation was founded in 1980 on nine acres of land. Ruby Tiger Osceola and 17 members of her family moved from Bradenton onto the reservation, at the urging of then-Chief James E. Billie.

== Reservations ==
Other Seminole Tribe of Florida reservations are:

- Big Cypress Reservation, the largest territory, including 81.972 sq mi (212.306 km^{2}), in Broward and Hendry Counties
- Brighton Reservation, 57.090 sq mi (147.862 km^{2}), Glades County
- Hollywood Reservation (formerly called the Dania Reservation), 497 acres (2.01 km^{2}) acres, Broward County
- Immokalee Reservation, Collier County
- Fort Pierce Reservation, a 50 acres (0.20 km^{2}) site in St. Lucie County, taken into trust for the tribe in 1995 by the United States Department of the Interior

== Language ==
Most members of the tribe are bilingual, speaking the Mikasuki language (which is also spoken by the Miccosukee Tribe) and English. Use of both Muskogean languages has declined among younger people.

== See also ==
- Seminole music
