= Villa Providence =

- U.S. National Register of Historic Places
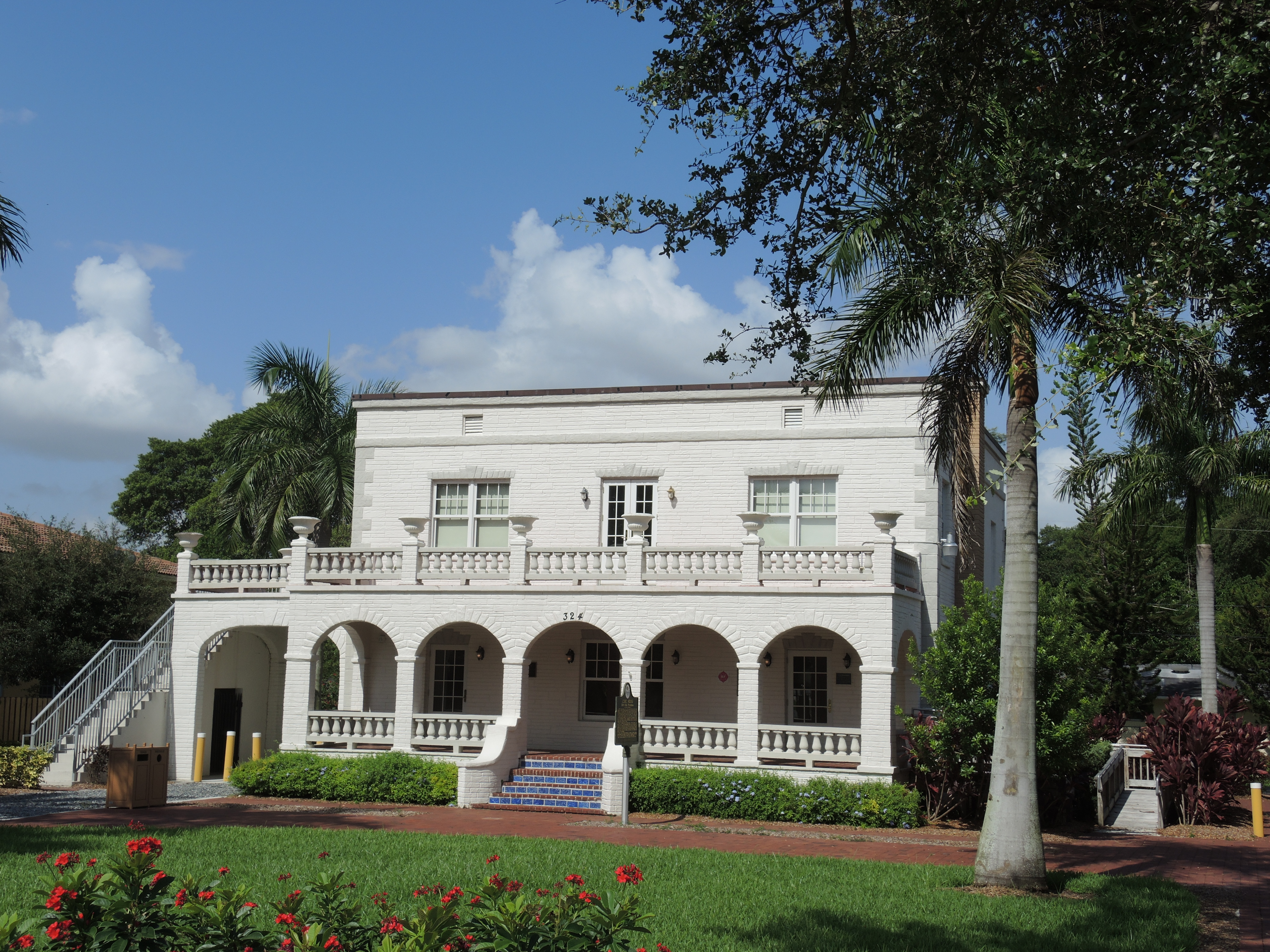
- Villa Providence
- Location: Hallandale Beach, Florida
- NRHP reference No.: 13000962
- Added to NRHP: 17 April 2014

Villa Providence is a national historic site located at 324 SW 2nd Avenue, Hallandale Beach, Florida in Broward County. Built in 1924 in Italian Renaissance style by Frank and Rosina Curci, it was their residence up to 1955.

It was added to the National Register of Historic Places in 2014.
