= Sample-McDougald House =

Historic house in Florida, United States

- U.S. National Register of Historic Places
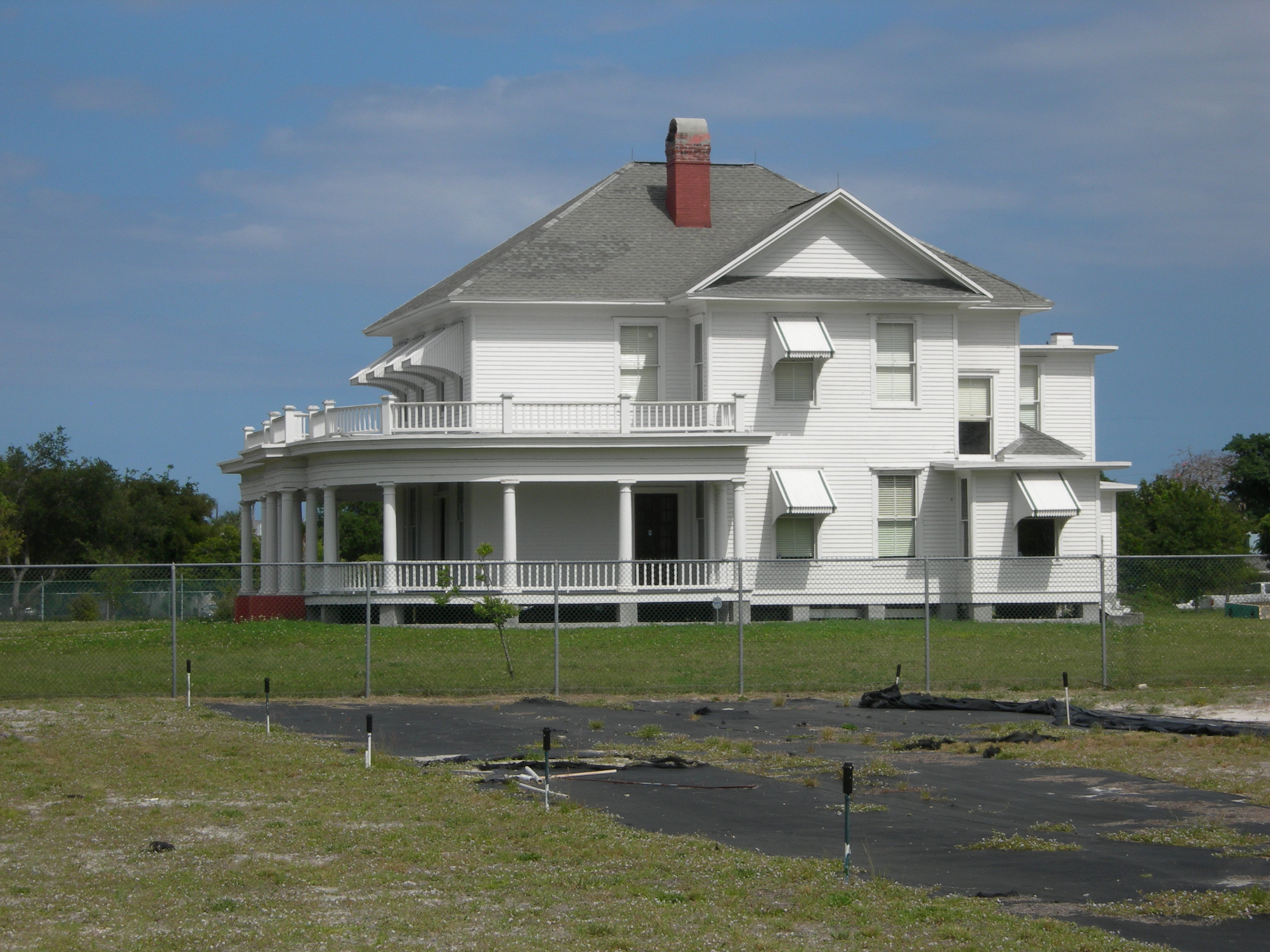

- Location within Florida Location within the United States
- Location: Pompano Beach, Florida
- Coordinates: 26°14′24.41″N 80°07′01.60″W
- Built: 1916
- Architect: Albert Neal Sample
- Architectural style: Colonial Revival
- NRHP reference No.: 04000970
- Added to NRHP: 15 September 2004

The Sample-McDougald House (also known as the Sample Estate or Pinehaven) is a 4,700 square feet (440 m^{2}) historic home in Pompano Beach, Florida, built in 1916. It is currently located at 450 Northeast 10th Street, but was originally built on Dixie Highway and moved to its present location by the Sample-McDougald House Preservation Society in 2001. On September 15, 2004, it was added to the U.S. National Register of Historic Places. The house is open as a house museum of pioneer South Florida lifestyle. The house grounds are Centennial Park, maintained by the city of Pompano Beach.

== Building ==
It is a two-story wood house with an irregular floor plan. Large central hallways on each floor are the axis of the interior space.

== History ==
The original site and building known as the Sample Estate was listed on the National Register of Historic Places in 1984. When the house was moved in 2001 it was de-listed. In 2004 it was renominated (as the "Sample-McDougald House") and added to the register in 2004.
