= Nyberg-Swanson House =

Historic house in Florida, United States

- U.S. National Register of Historic Places
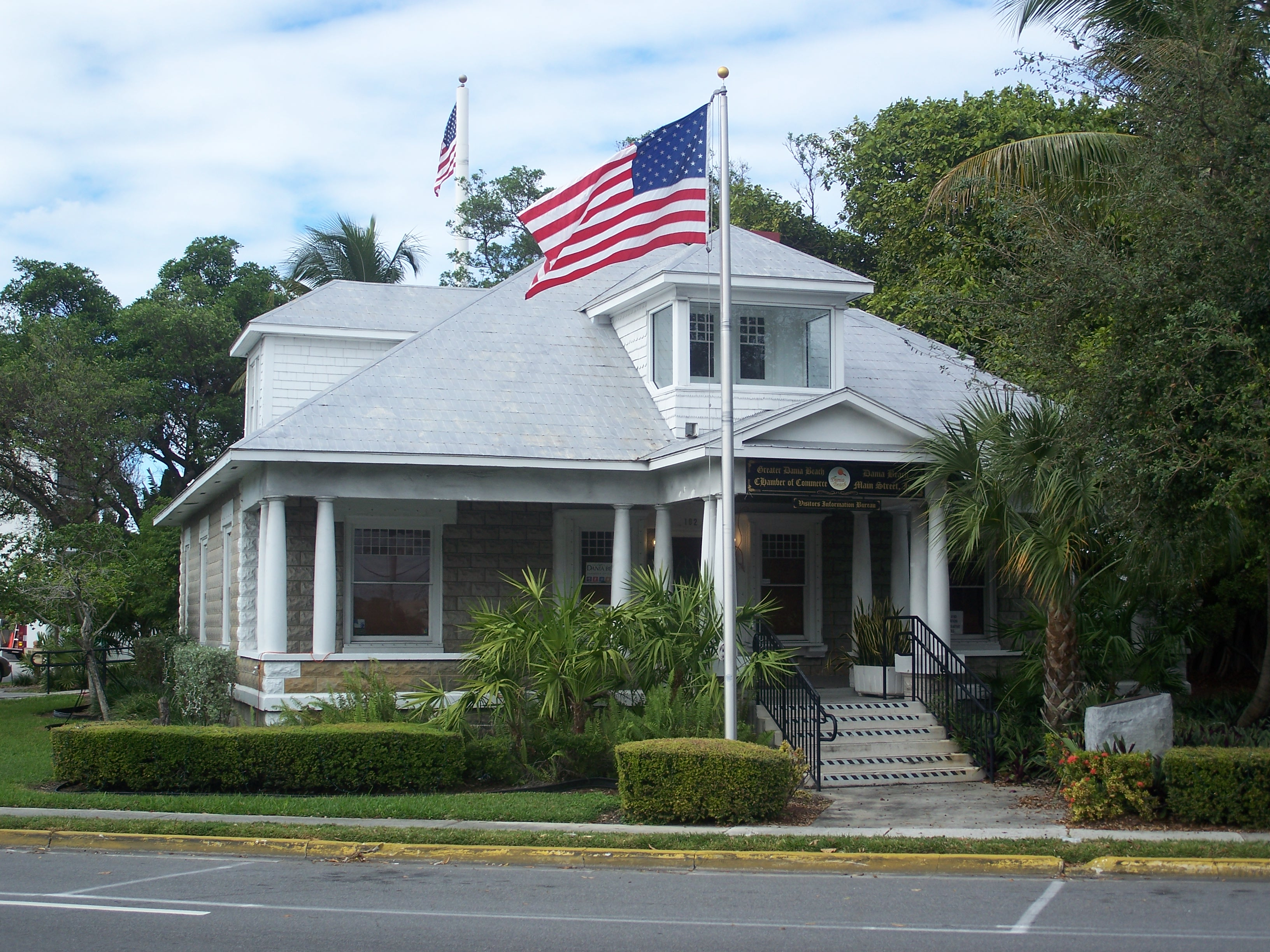

- Location within Florida Location within the United States
- Location: Dania Beach, Florida United States
- Coordinates: 26°3′8″N 80°8′42″W
- Built: c. 1912
- Architectural style: Colonial Revival
- NRHP reference No.: 99000583
- Added to NRHP: 28 May 1999

The Nyberg-Swanson House (also known as the Charles Nelson House) is a historic home in Dania Beach, Florida. It is located at 102 West Dania Beach Boulevard. On May 28, 1999, it was added to the U.S. National Register of Historic Places.

== Building ==
The 1 1/2-story, rectangular home was built c. 1912. It is the only extant example of rusticated concrete block construction in Dania Beach.

== Modern times ==
Crowds of hundreds gathered at 4 AM in 1993 to watch building moved along Federal Highway from its original location (202 S. Federal Hwy.) to its current location. The Nyberg-Swanson House was made a part of the city of Dania Beach Historic Preservation Plan in 2000. The same year the Dania Beach Chamber of Commerce began using the building for office space.

The Dania Beach City Parks and Recreation Department office relocated to the house in 2001. In 2003 a lease for two years, at a rate of ten dollars per year, replaced the verbal agreement the chamber had with the city. The building was renovated in 2004. The office of the City Attorney was moved to the house in c. 2006. In 2009 the house was being used jointly by the city's Recreation Department and Chamber of Commerce.
