= Sam Gilliam House =

Historic house in Florida, United States

- U.S. National Register of Historic Places
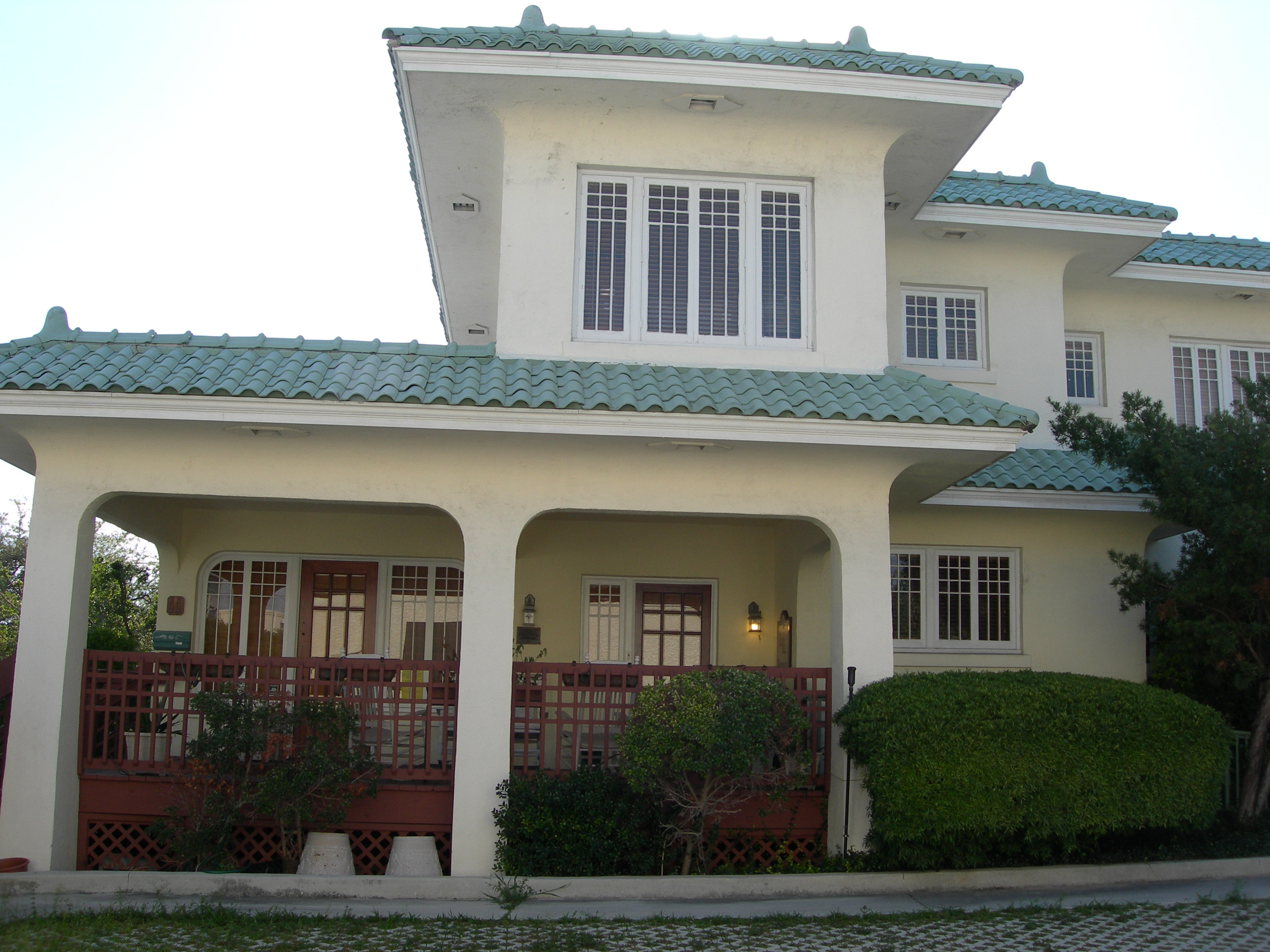

- Location within Florida Location within the United States
- Location: Fort Lauderdale, Florida
- Coordinates: 26°06′11.17″N 80°08′35.75″W
- Built: c. 1925
- Architectural style: Mission/Spanish Revival, Prairie School
- NRHP reference No.: 01000289
- Added to NRHP: 29 March 2001

The Sam Gilliam House (also known as the Gilliam-Adams House) is a historic home in Fort Lauderdale, Florida. It is located at 11 Southwest 15th Street. On March 29, 2001, it was added to the U.S. National Register of Historic Places.

== Building ==
The two-story building displays features of both the mediterranean revival and Prairie School architectural styles. It has a flat roof with parapets concealed by pent roofs with green barrel tiles. It was built c. 1925 by Sam Gilliam owner of a lumber company. Constructed of hollow clay tile covered with stucco the exterior does not have much ornamentation instead using window and roof design to create visual interest. The pent roofs, attached to the parapet walls, conceal the parapet and create wide overhanging eaves. The roof ridge junctions feature loaf shaped tile finials. The interior of the house is notable for its use of wood, with inlaid doors, tiger oak floors, red oak mantles, wide baseboards and French doors.

== History ==
The Gilliam house was originally built at the corner of SE 9th Street and SE 3rd Avenue at 300 SE 9th Street. It was commissioned in 1924 at the peak of the Florida land boom of the 1920s. In 1998 the house was offered for free to anyone who could move it from the original site. The current owners moved the 3,900 square foot structure in July 1998 to its current location at 11 SW 15th Street adjacent to the historic Croissant Park Administration Building.

== Sam Gilliam ==
Sam Gilliam in addition to operating a lumber and building business was a leader in the local Republican party. The house was designed to be a showplace with its striking design and ornamented inside with fine woodwork. The guests at Gilliam's parties are said to have included presidents. Gilliam came to Fort Lauderdale in 1913 working as local manager for a Palm Beach lumber company. The next year he went into business for himself starting the Everglades Lumber Company. Noted as a Republican in primarily Democratic Broward County he was active in politics. Gilliam was a delegate to several Republican National Conventions, arranged a golf outing for president-elect Warren G. Harding and may have entertained Herbert Hoover.
