= Williams House (Fort Lauderdale, Florida) =

Historic house in Florida, United States

- U.S. National Register of Historic Places
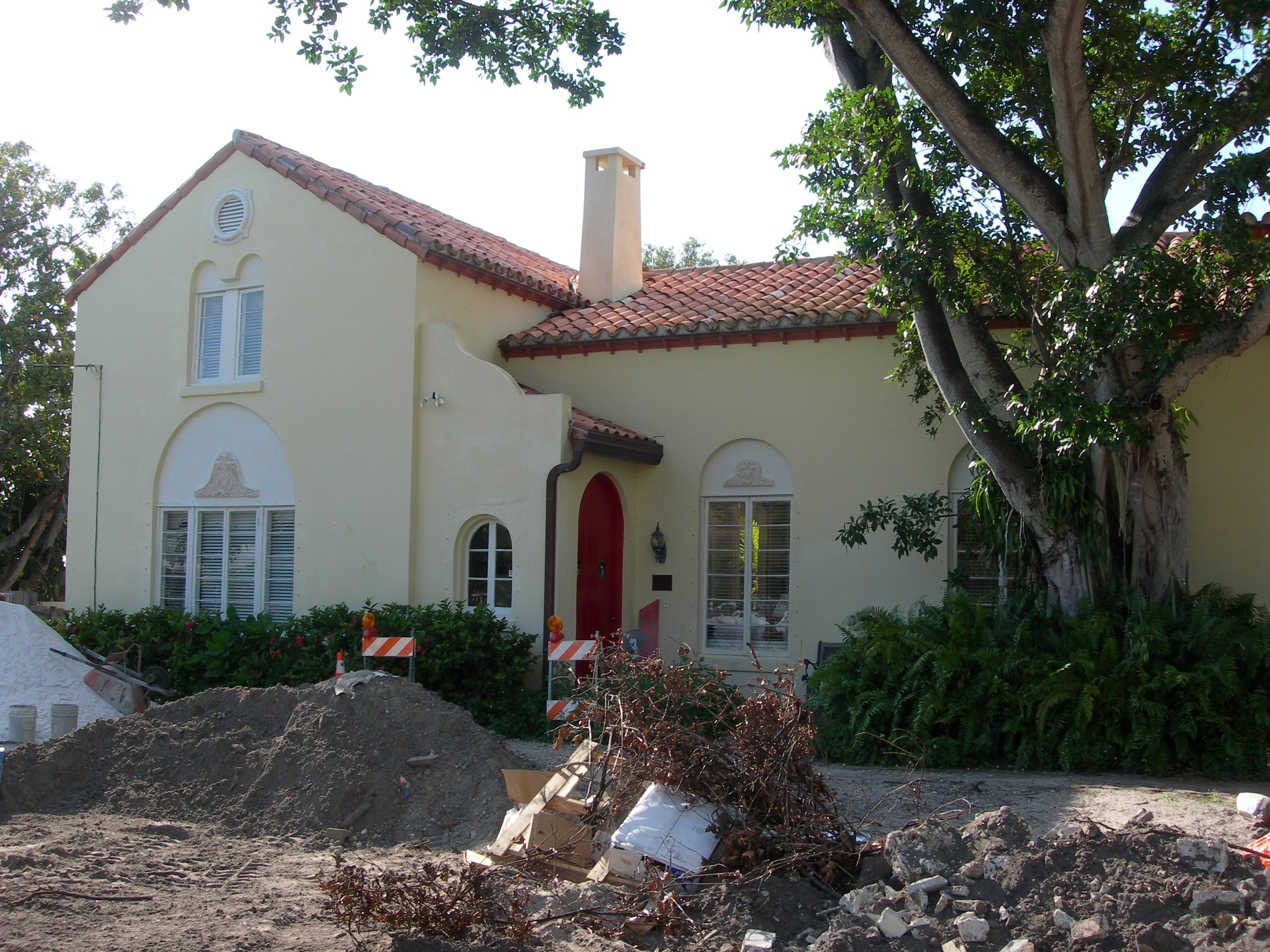

- Location within Florida Location within the United States
- Location: Fort Lauderdale, Florida United States
- Coordinates: 26°06′31.32″N 80°08′30.53″W
- Architectural style: Mediterranean Revival
- NRHP reference No.: 05001089
- Added to NRHP: 28 September 2005

The Williams House is a historic house in Fort Lauderdale, Florida. It is located at 119 Rose Drive. On 28 September 2005, it was added to the U.S. National Register of Historic Places. The two-story masonry building was constructed circa 1926 in the Mediterranean Revival architectural style. The exterior is smooth stucco over concrete block. The roof brackets, gable vents and decorative cartouches are made of cast concrete. The building has an irregular footprint and an asymmetrical façade and sits on a 3,212-square-foot (298.4 m^{2}) property.
