= Croissant Park Administration Building =

- U.S. National Register of Historic Places
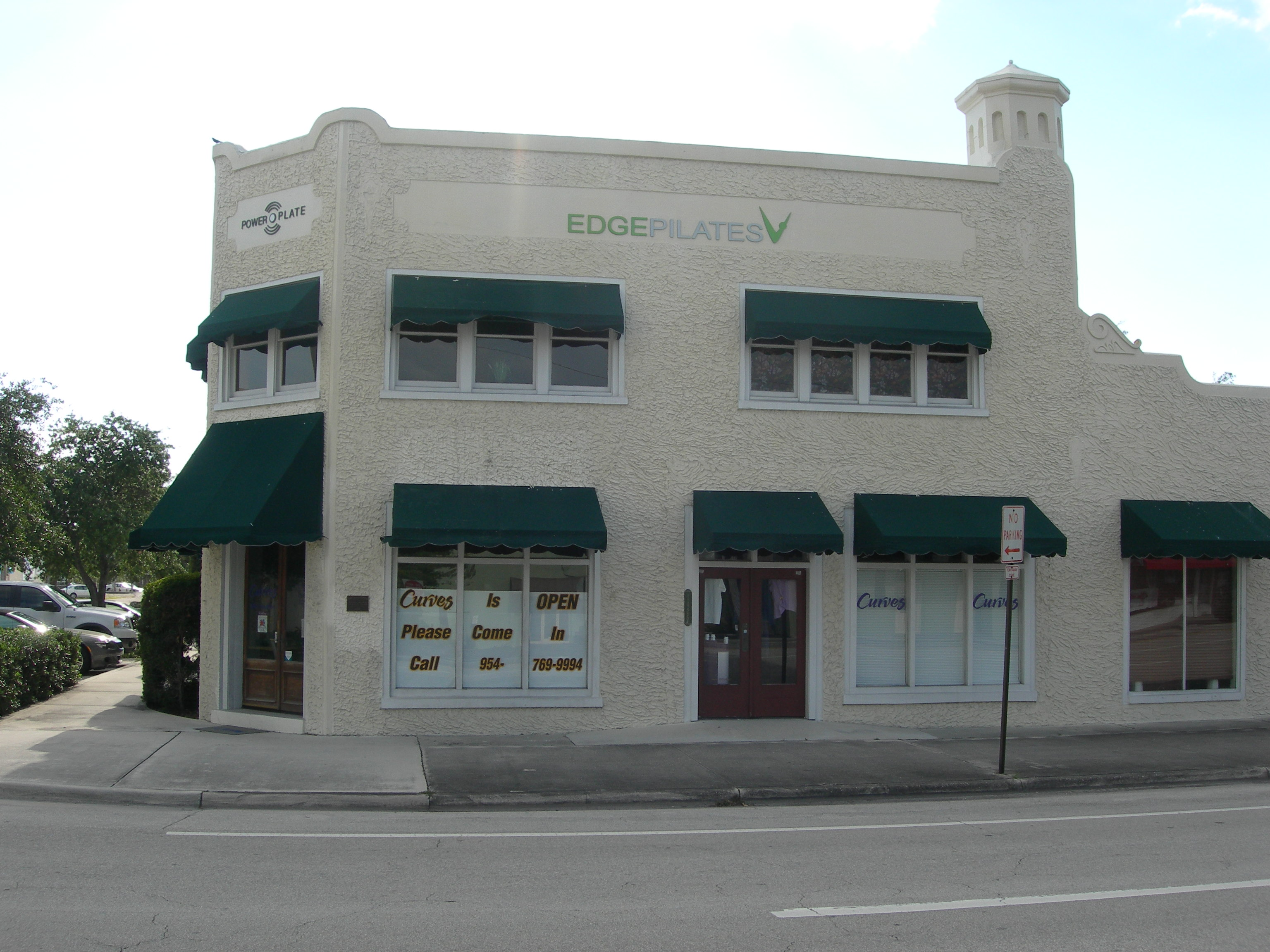
- Location: Fort Lauderdale, Florida
- Coordinates: 26°06′10.84″N 80°08′34.48″W
- NRHP reference No.: 01000761
- Added to NRHP: July 25, 2001

The Croissant Park Administration Building is a historic site in Fort Lauderdale, Florida. It is located at 1421 South Andrews Avenue. On July 25, 2001, it was added to the U.S. National Register of Historic Places.

== Building ==
Built in the mission revival architectural style in 1923 the architect is believed to be Francis Abreu. Abreu designed many Fort Lauderdale buildings during the 1920s. An L-shaped two-story poured concrete building, it features a textured stucco exterior and concrete lamps on the roof corners. The 6,000 square foot building has a cut corner entrance and a flat roof with parapets. Inside a cypress wood staircase leads to the second floor which has Dade Pine floors.

== Croissant Park ==
G. Frank Croissant used this building as headquarters for sales of the Croissant Park development. Croissant Park was built from 1,200 acres Croissant bought in 1924 for $1.25 million. (Note: Bothel gives a figure of 1,270 acres.) It was one of the largest Fort Lauderdale developments of the Florida land boom of the 1920s.

== Modern times ==
In 2001 the owners of the building and the Sam Gilliam house received an award for the rehabilitation and preservation of the two buildings from the Fort Lauderdale Historical Society.
