= Sample Estate =

Historic house in Florida, United States

- U.S. National Register of Historic Places
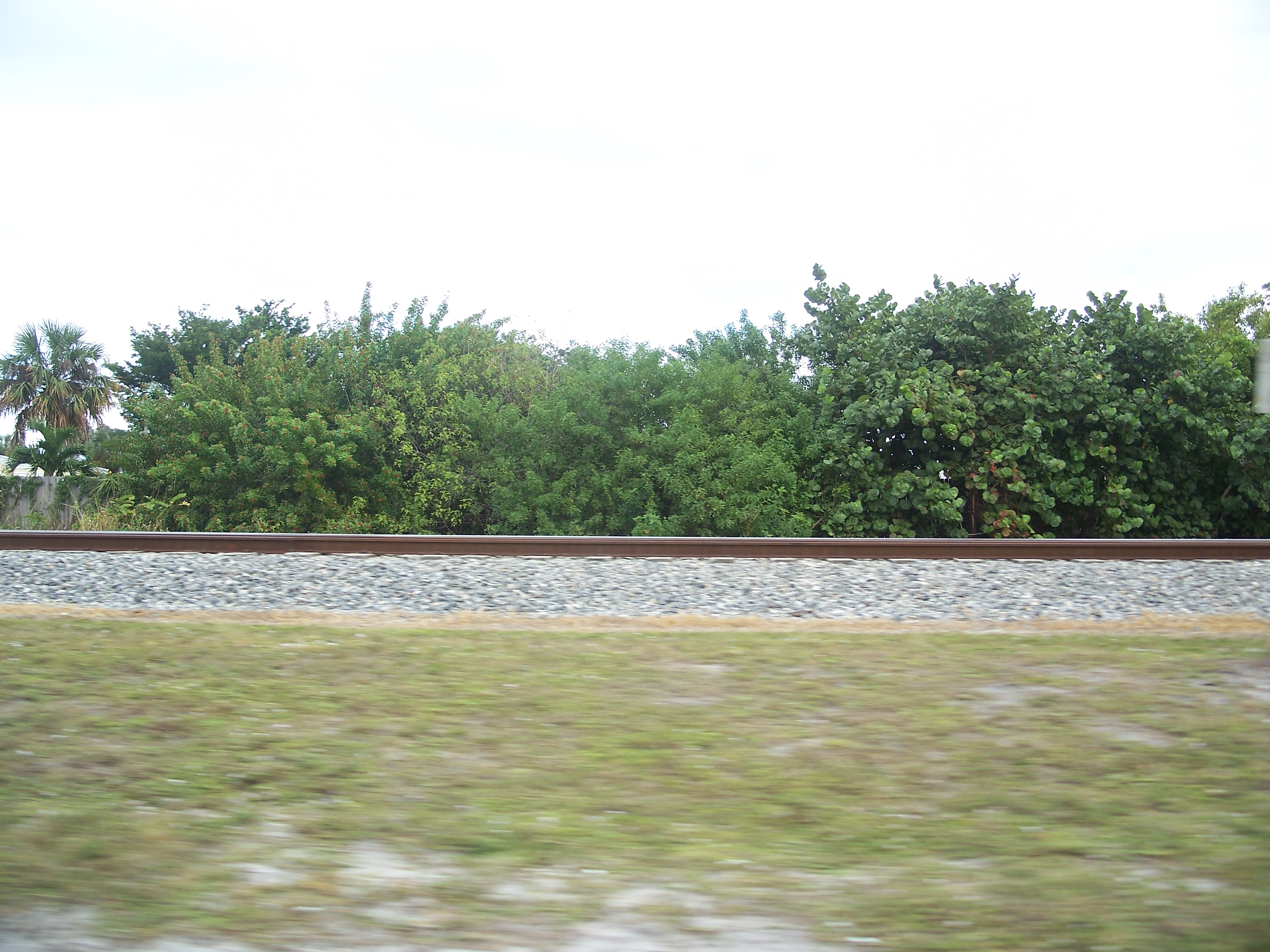

- Location within Florida Location within the United States
- Location: 3161 North Dixie Highway, Pompano Beach, Florida
- Coordinates: 26°16′11″N 80°6′57″W
- Area: 1 acre (0.40 ha)
- Built: 1916
- Architect: Albert Neal Sample
- Architectural style: Colonial Revival
- NRHP reference No.: 84000834
- Added to NRHP: 1 March 1984

The Sample Estate (also known as the McDougald House) is a historic house located at 3161 North Dixie Highway in Pompano Beach, Florida. The house is a noteworthy example of the Colonial Revival style and is one of the most architecturally distinguished homes in the community.

== Description and history ==
Completed in 1916, the large, two-story, seventeen-room house was designed by Albert Neal Sample in the Colonial Revival style of architecture. The main or east facade of the house is dominated by a one-story porch which extends to the south of the main block of the house to create an open porte-cochere. On March 1, 1984, it was added to the National Register of Historic Places.

== House moved ==
In 2001 the significant building on the estate, the Sample-McDougald House was moved to 450 Northeast 10th Street. The house was listed on the National Register of historic Places in its current location in 2004. The property was then de-listed, the house was later renominated and added to the register as the Sample-McDougald House in 2004.
