= Hammerstein House =

Historic house in Florida, United States

- U.S. National Register of Historic Places
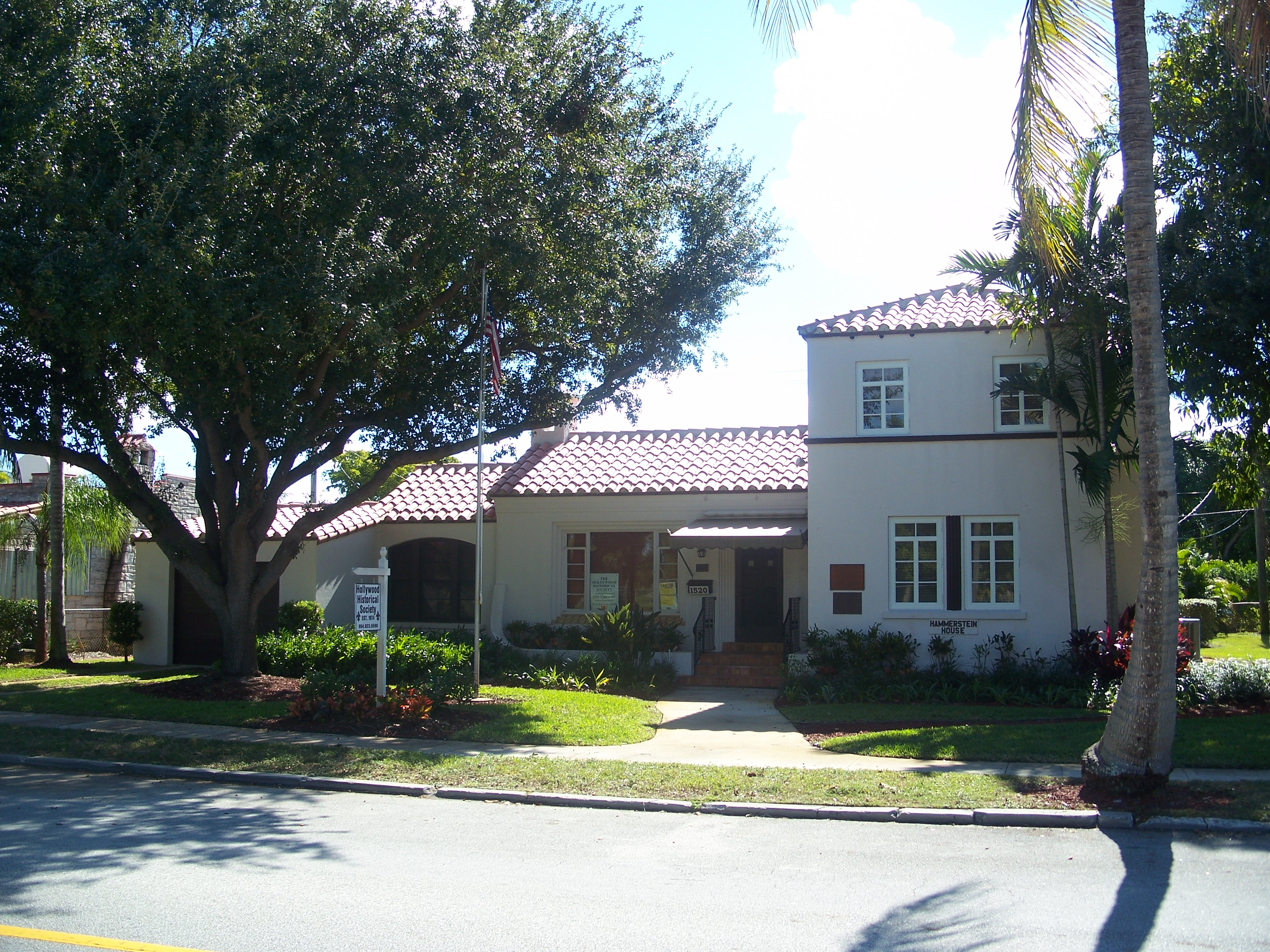

- Location within Florida Location within the United States
- Location: Hollywood, Florida
- Coordinates: 26°0′53″N 80°8′16″W
- Architect: Bayard Lukens
- Architectural style: Mediterranean Revival
- NRHP reference No.: 05000051
- Added to NRHP: 15 February 2005

The Hammerstein House (also known as the Rust House) is a historic house located at 1520 Polk Street in Hollywood, Florida, United States.

== Building ==
The house was completed in 1935 in the locally popular Mediterranean Revival style. It is a one and two-story building with gable and hip roofing. The exterior walls are smooth stucco and the roof is Spanish tile. The one-story portion contains the public spaces and the two-story section has bedrooms and private baths. A garage is located behind the house. Hollywood architect Bayard Lukens a Pennsylvania native designed the house for the Hammerstein couple. Lukens also worked on many of Hollywood's churches and hotels. Bayard Lukens's private residence which he designed for himself is also on the list of historical sites in Hollywood and is located on the 1500-block of Adams Street in Hollywood.

== History ==
In 1980 the owner of the home Clarence Hammerstein donated the house to the Hollywood Historical Society in honor of his late wife Vera Hammerstein. It was his wish that the home be operated as a museum and he contributed many artifacts of his life which form much of the display there. Items on display include Hammerstein's WWI Air Force uniform. The ashes of the home's owners Clarence and Vera Hammerstein reside at the house in two large urns. It was added to the National Register of Historic Places on February 15, 2005. The home is operated as a historic house museum by the Hollywood Historical Society and contains artifacts of the Hammerstein's life. When Hammerstein died in 1987 at the age of 92 he donated 10% of his estate for the operation of the house as a museum.
