= Seminole Hard Rock Hotel & Casino Hollywood =

Integrated resort in Broward County, Florida, U.S.

Coordinates: 26.051318°N 80.210034°W

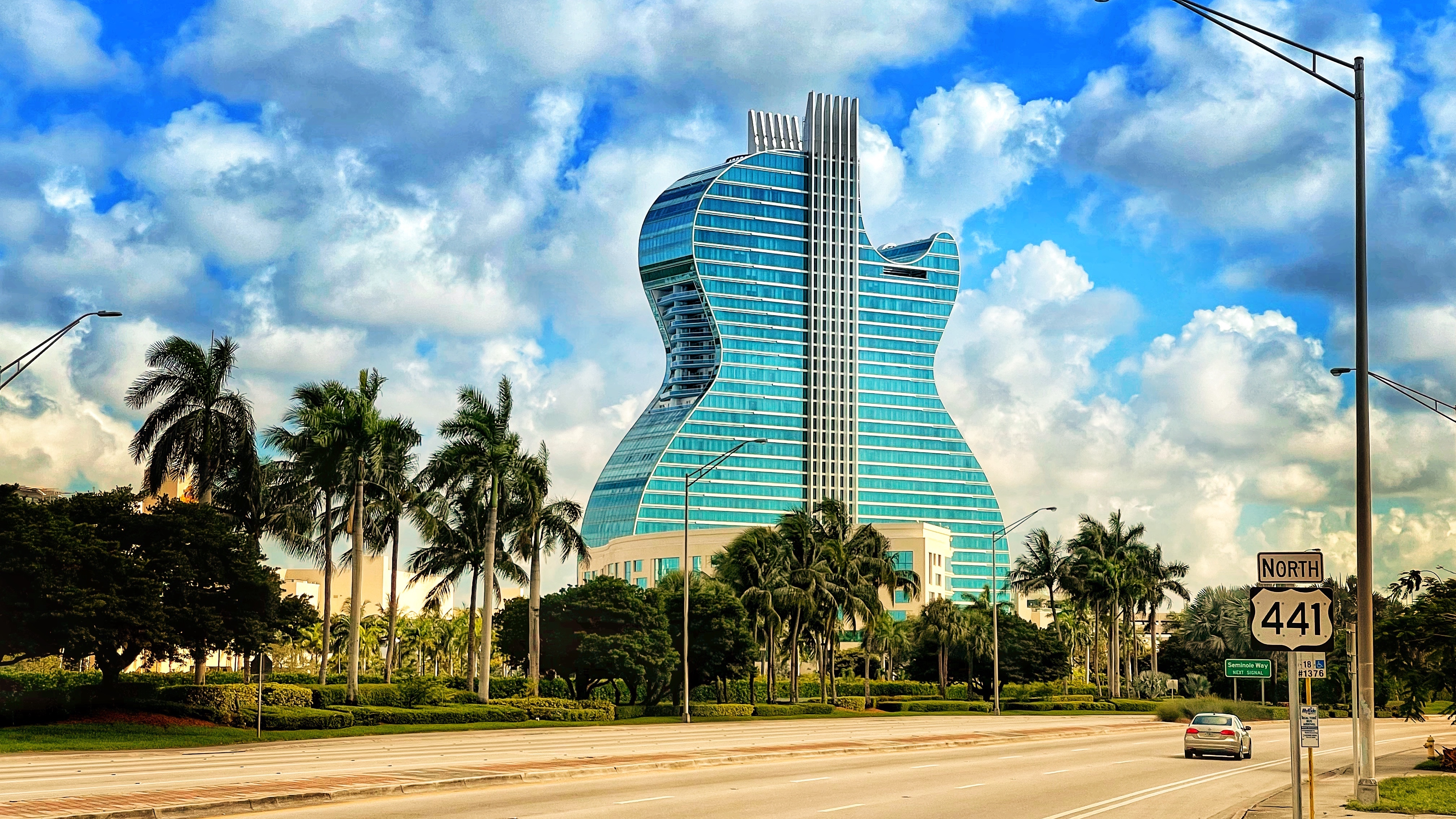
- The resort in June 2021
- Interactive map of Seminole Hard Rock Hotel & Casino Hollywood
- Location: Hollywood, Florida, U.S. (Note: The exact city location is also sometimes listed as Davie, Florida in some sources due to a shared ZIP code.); 1 Seminole Way Hollywood Reservation, 33314
- Opened: May 11, 2004; 22 years ago (main resort); October 24, 2019; 7 years ago (expansion)
- Theme: Rock and roll
- No. of rooms: 1,275
- Gaming space: 140,000 square feet (13,000 m^{2})
- Signature attractions: Hard Rock Live; The Shoppes at The Guitar Hotel; DAER Dayclub & Nightclub; Hard Rock Store
- Notable restaurants: Hard Rock Cafe; Council Oak Steaks & Seafood; Kuro Japanese Craft Kitchen; Oculus Bar
- Casino type: Land-based
- Owner: Seminole Gaming (Seminole Tribe of Florida)
- Operating license holder: Hard Rock International
- Architect: Klai Juba Wald Architecture + Interiors
- Renovated in: May 9, 2014; March 31, 2017 – October 24, 2019
- Website: casino.hardrock.com/hollywood
- Building details

Design and construction
- Developer: The Cordish Companies and Coastal Development, LLC (under Power Plant Entertainment, LLC)
- Main contractor: Tutor Perini Building Corp.

Renovating team
- Architect: Rockwell Group (The Oculus)
- Renovating firm: Hard Rock International
- Main contractor: Suffolk-Yates

Other information
- Number of stores: 17 in The Shoppes (at peak); Roughly 55 as Seminole Paradise
- Parking: Free and valet parking in three parking garages: Winner's Way Garage; Lucky Street Garage; Seminole Way Garage

The Seminole Hard Rock Hotel & Casino Hollywood is an integrated resort in Broward County, Florida, United States, part of the Miami/Fort Lauderdale metropolitan area, located on 100 acres (40 ha) of the Hollywood Reservation of the Seminole Tribe of Florida. As of October 2019, the property has three hotel towers, a 140,000-square-foot (13,000 m^{2}) casino, large poker room, and a 4-acre (1.6 ha) lagoon-style pool facility.

A large expansion was completed in October 2019, adding The Guitar Hotel, designed and constructed to resemble a Gibson Les Paul guitar hence the name. The expansion also involved the replacement of Seminole Paradise with The Shoppes at The Guitar Hotel, and the opening of a 7,000-seat Hard Rock Live to replace the smaller 5,500-seat arena of the same name.

== History ==
=== 2000–2005: Planning, construction, and opening ===
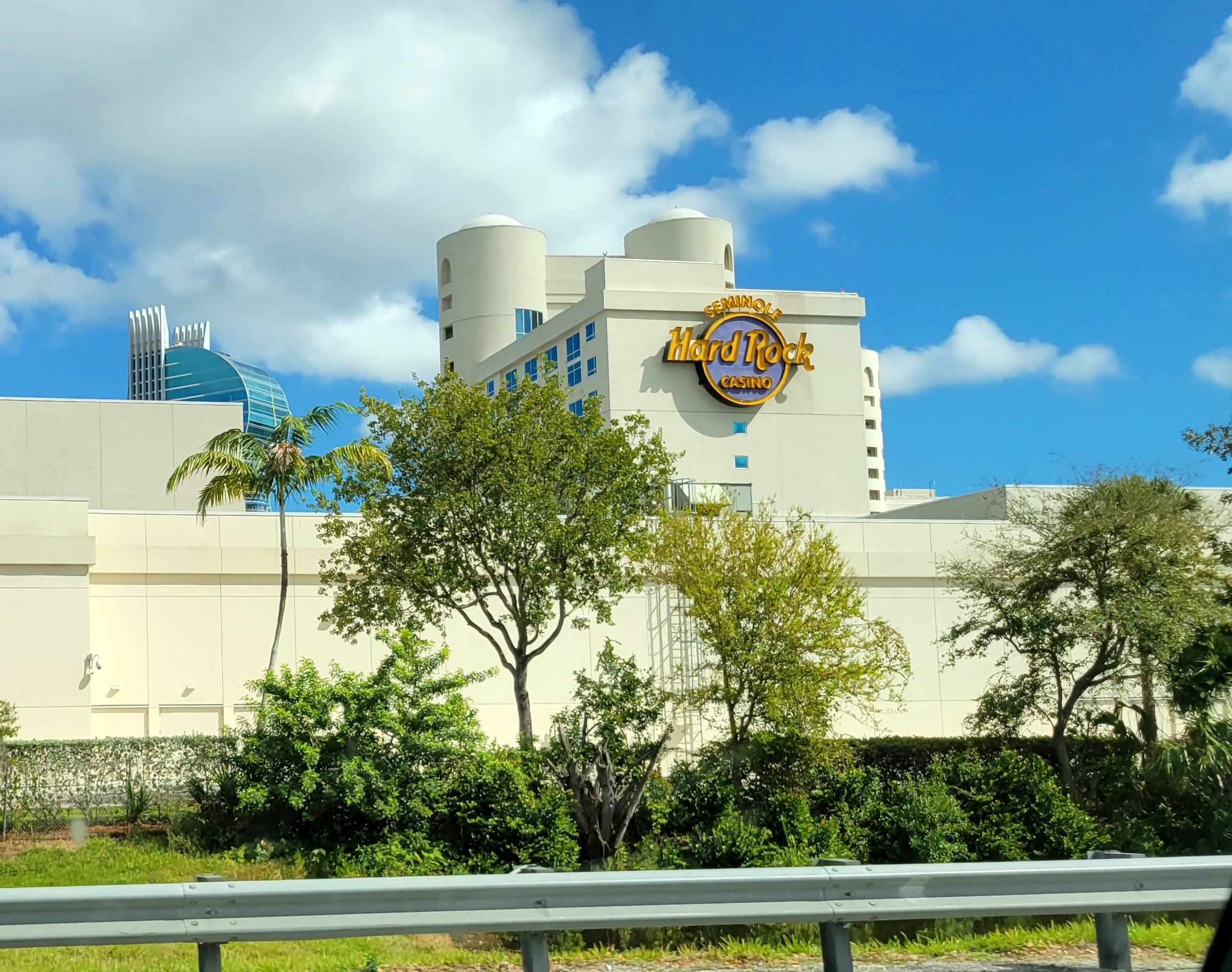
The resort as viewed from Florida's Turnpike (February 2023)

In early 2000, CEO David S. Cordish of the Baltimore, Maryland-based Cordish Companies partnered with Chairman James E. Billie of the Seminole Tribe of Florida, and Cordish formed an affiliate with Coastal Development, LLC, called Power Plant Entertainment, LLC. After several negotiations and background checks, the Seminole Tribe officially signed two major contracts with the Cordish Cos. in July of that year, which included a developer agreement to build casino hotels in Hollywood and Tampa, and a "financial services engagement letter" to support project funding.

Power Plant Entertainment formally signed on to develop the complexes under a joint venture with Hard Rock Cafe International, Inc.'s then-parent company, The Rank Group plc. On January 8, 2001, leaders gathered for a groundbreaking ceremony around a giant sand sculpture of a guitar, and the initial budget announced for the Hollywood and Tampa complexes was $400 million. The Orlando-based Hard Rock Cafe would run the trademark restaurants, retail shops, and music memorabilia curation, while the Seminole Tribe retained complete responsibility for operating the casino floors. The Hard Rock Hotel and Casino Hollywood was planned to absorb and phase out the Seminole Tribe's lower scale bingo halls and gaming halls they were operating at the time. The timeline of construction encountered problems when in mid-2001, the Seminole Tribal Council voted to suspend Jim Billie, which briefly stalled project momentum, and general tribal voting over the summer of that year adjusted the exact terms of the Cordish deal, intentionally extending the projected construction timeline by an extra six months.

The final proposal was planned to span across 100 acres (40 ha) on the northern edge of the Hollywood Reservation adjacent to their existing gaming facility at U.S. Route 441 and Stirling Road, with 115,000 square feet (10,700 m^{2}) of dedicated gaming space configured to hold 2,000 slot machines and 65 table games, and Hard Rock Live, a 1,000-seat indoor live entertainment and concert arena utilizing Cordish's Live! concept taken from Power Plant Live! (hence the name "Power Plant" Entertainment, LLC). The complex would feature a total of 12 distinct restaurants, anchored by a flagship multi-level Hard Rock Cafe venue, a 10,000-square-foot (930 m^{2}) conference layout centered around an 8,000-square-foot (740 m^{2}) grand ballroom divided into eight sections, and a 3-acre (1.2 ha) lagoon-style pool facility featuring a lakeside beach club, water slides, a health spa, and a central poolside bar. The hotel would be a 17-story tower designed to house 750 guest rooms and suites, and parking infrastructure designed to hold over 2,600 vehicles, split between a 1,600 car multi-level parking garage and a 1,000-space surface lot. Financing for the projects was secured via the sale of $315 million worth of Capital Trust Agency Revenue bonds by the Seminoles in May 2002 to begin full physical construction.

Construction was managed by the Tutor Perini Building Corp., and Klai Juba Architects was hired to design the integrated resort. The contract amount was $147 million. Prior to the opening of the Seminole Hard Rock Hotel & Casino, the Tampa location began operation on March 11, 2004. Rank already had an existing Hard Rock Cafe location in Broward County, being the Sawgrass Mills location in Sunrise, which opened on July 7, 1999; to avoid cannibalization, that location permanently closed its doors on May 9, 2004. The Seminole Hard Rock Hotel & Casino had its grand opening celebration and ribbon-cutting ceremony on May 11 of that year, with Huey Lewis and the News serving as the headline musical performers for the celebration, alongside the appearance of celebrities and rock stars, including Adam Gaynor of Matchbox Twenty, and it quickly became South Florida's premier gaming hub, pulling immense crowds eager to experience the 140,000-square-foot (13,000 m^{2}) casino floor and second-story cafe. (Note: Some sources might list "May 1, 2004" instead of "May 11, 2004", but official sources—such as Tampa Bay Times and Sun Sentinel—list May 11.)

Within the resort's first year of operation, it approached $500 million of combined revenue alongside its Tampa sister. Both casinos had to rely on "Class II" video bingo machines, which resembled and functioned like Vegas slot machines because Florida had not yet signed a formal table game compact with the tribe at the time.

=== 2004–2010: Contract dispute and corporate litigation ===
On December 30, 2004, then-real estate mogul Donald J. Trump of Trump Entertainment Resorts filed a multi-million dollar lawsuit against Cordish in the Broward County Circuit Court citing fraud and a breach of fiduciary duty, alleging that his former associate, Richard T. Fields and Cordish had secretly "stolen" his proprietary plans and excluded him from the massive Florida deal.

In 2006, Florida circuit judge Jeffrey Streitfeld reprimanded Trump's legal team for failing to produce internal email servers from the late 1990s and early 2000s, and the plaintiff argued that they had no central email servers during the exact years they accused Cordish of leaving them out. In May 2008, the lawsuit was settled amid the Great Recession, when Fields agreed to acquire Trump Marina in Atlantic City, New Jersey for $316 million and rebrand it into Jimmy Buffett's Margaritaville, but the lawsuit was requested to be revived in October 2009. Concurrent with Trump Entertainment Resorts navigating its Chapter 11 bankruptcy restructuring plan, the court dismissed the litigation with prejudice in 2010, with no action taken against Trump or Cordish.

Parallel to the Trump litigation, in October 2005, the Seminole Tribe sued Power Plant Entertainment in federal court to terminate their original agreement, labeling it an "illegal and unconscionable contract" and arguing that the payout structure, which made them pay the developers 30% of net gaming profits over 10 years and 30% of hotel profits over 15, was ultimately forcing them to pay Cordish $2.2 billion "for doing absolutely nothing" after the properties were completed. However, The Cordish Companies bypassed the federal Indian Gaming Regulatory Act (IGRA) caps as the initial 2000 deal strictly allowed them to develop and consult the resorts, rather than manage them. Per an announcement on May 23, 2006, the Seminoles would continue to pay Cordish until a settlement happens.

Then, on December 7, 2006, the Seminole Tribe announced that they would acquire Hard Rock Cafe International from the Rank Group for $965 million. Furious regarding the previous contract dispute, The Cordish Companies countersued the Seminole Tribe on January 3, 2007, alongside Hard Rock Cafe International, alleging that they and their financial backer, Goldman Sachs & Co., were locked out of the deal as Rank and the Seminoles negotiated for seven months, securing promises that the management would stay in place and receiving additional financial incentives after the buyout. Furthermore, Cordish was planning to offer Rank a higher purchase price to acquire Hard Rock.

On March 2 of that year, a financial settlement was formed; S&P Global Ratings disclosed that the Seminole Tribe agreed to loan Power Plant Entertainment $525 million and pay the company $10.5 million annually for 22 years. On April 19 of that year, all claims by the Seminoles and Cordish were dropped, with the tribe acknowledging the original developer fees as "fair and equitable," while Cordish pulled back from the bid-rigging claims, citing they determined no collusion has occurred, allowing the tribe to complete its acquisition of Hard Rock and merge it under a single umbrella known as Hard Rock International.

=== 2013–2019: Renovations and expansion ===
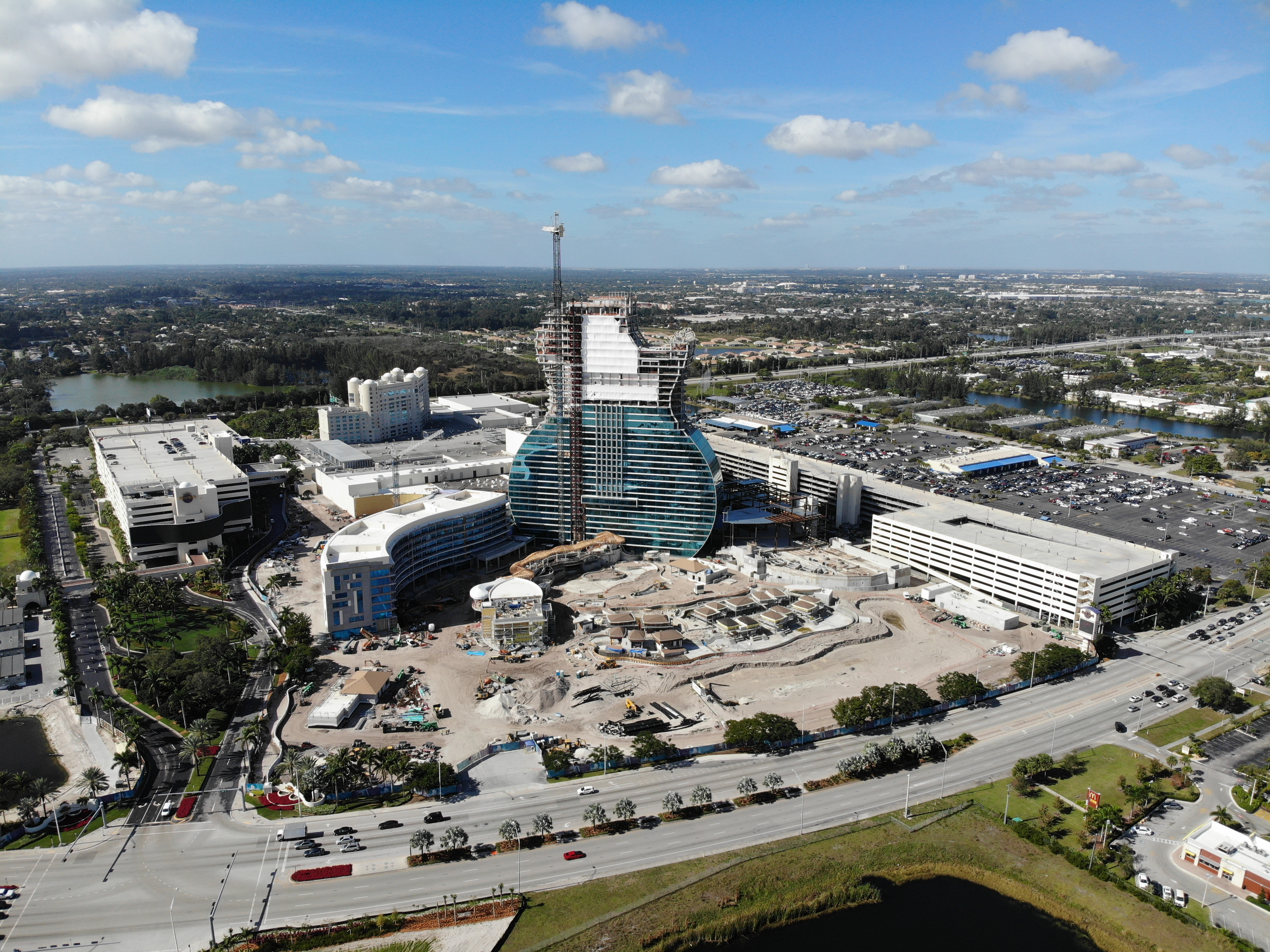
Under construction (December 2018)

In 2013, the resort rebranded its popular summer poker tournament series into the Seminole Hard Rock Poker Open (SHRPO). On May 9, 2014, to celebrate the Seminole Hard Rock Hotel & Casino's 10th anniversary, Jim Billie announced a $100 million property upgrade of the tribe's casinos, with the majority of spent on the Seminole Hard Rock Hollywood location, including improved entryways, center pool bar, pool facility upgrades, updated hotel room and suite interiors, and a new restaurant called Kuro Japanese Craft Kitchen, which would open by late March 2015.

On February 1, 2016, the Seminole Tribe announced the addition of a 800-room hotel in the shape of a Gibson Les Paul guitar on the property. and about $100 million in updates to the pool area. This proposal, which would cost $1.5 billion, was extended and modified on October 25, 2017, featuring the addition of 806 suites and guestrooms, and 638 in the 450-foot (140 m) 35-story Guitar Hotel, increasing the total number to over 1,300. 60,000 square feet (5,600 m^{2}) of retail and restaurant space would be added, alongside a business center, a 42,000-square-foot (3,900 m^{2}) (Note: Some sources claim the Rock Spa has 41,000 square feet (3,800 m^{2}).) spa, and a completely rebuilt Hard Rock Live arena for $100 million. The groundbreaking ceremony held for the expansion featured a guitar smash with Steven Van Zandt. Steve Peck of Klai Juba Wald Architects returned to design the expansion, and Suffolk-Yates served as the general contractor. Hard Rock Cafe would close its doors on November 26, 2018 as part of a relocation within the resort, which immediately opened the following day with a triangle-shaped bar.

The expansion had its grand opening celebration on the night of October 24, 2019 and continued through October 25, marking the official debut of the Guitar Hotel's nightly light show, where its built-in LED strings and high-powered outdoor laser beams shot miles into the South Florida sky, programmed to change colors and move in sync with a dramatic musical score. Unlike the initial 2004 opening, the expansion debut did not feature a ribbon-cutting ceremony, but another guitar smashing event, where tribal leaders, Hard Rock executives, including Seminole Gaming CEO and Hard Rock International Chairman Jim Allen, and prominent celebrities destroyed a row of acoustic guitars simultaneously, accompanied by an outdoor fireworks display. The event also included the appearances of Johnny Depp, Morgan Freeman, Khloé Kardashian, and Scott Disick. A seven-story, mid-rise hotel known as the Oasis Tower also opened, featuring an additional 168 guest rooms and swim-up suites, and a specialized water curtain known as the Oculus, designed by the Rockwell Group and inspired by the Cyanometer.

=== 2020–present ===
As a result of the COVID-19 pandemic, the resort temporarily closed to the public on March 20, 2020 and reopened on June 12 under the implementation of Hard Rock's rigorous "Safe + Sound" social distancing guidelines.

By January 7, 2021, over $615 million in jackpots were awarded at the casino. That year, the Seminole Tribe signed a historic 30-year gaming compact with Florida Governor Ron DeSantis, and on May 25, 2023, the Trademark Trial and Appeal Board (TTAB) granted the Guitar Hotel trademark protection. However, on December 18, 2024, only the guitar-shaped design was trademarked, but the light strings were not because they were deemed "too common," despite the Seminole Tribe arguing that the light beams should be trademarked even when they are unattached to a guitar. In May 2024, the resort celebrated its 20th anniversary with commemorative art from locals.

== Features ==
=== Hotels and amenities ===
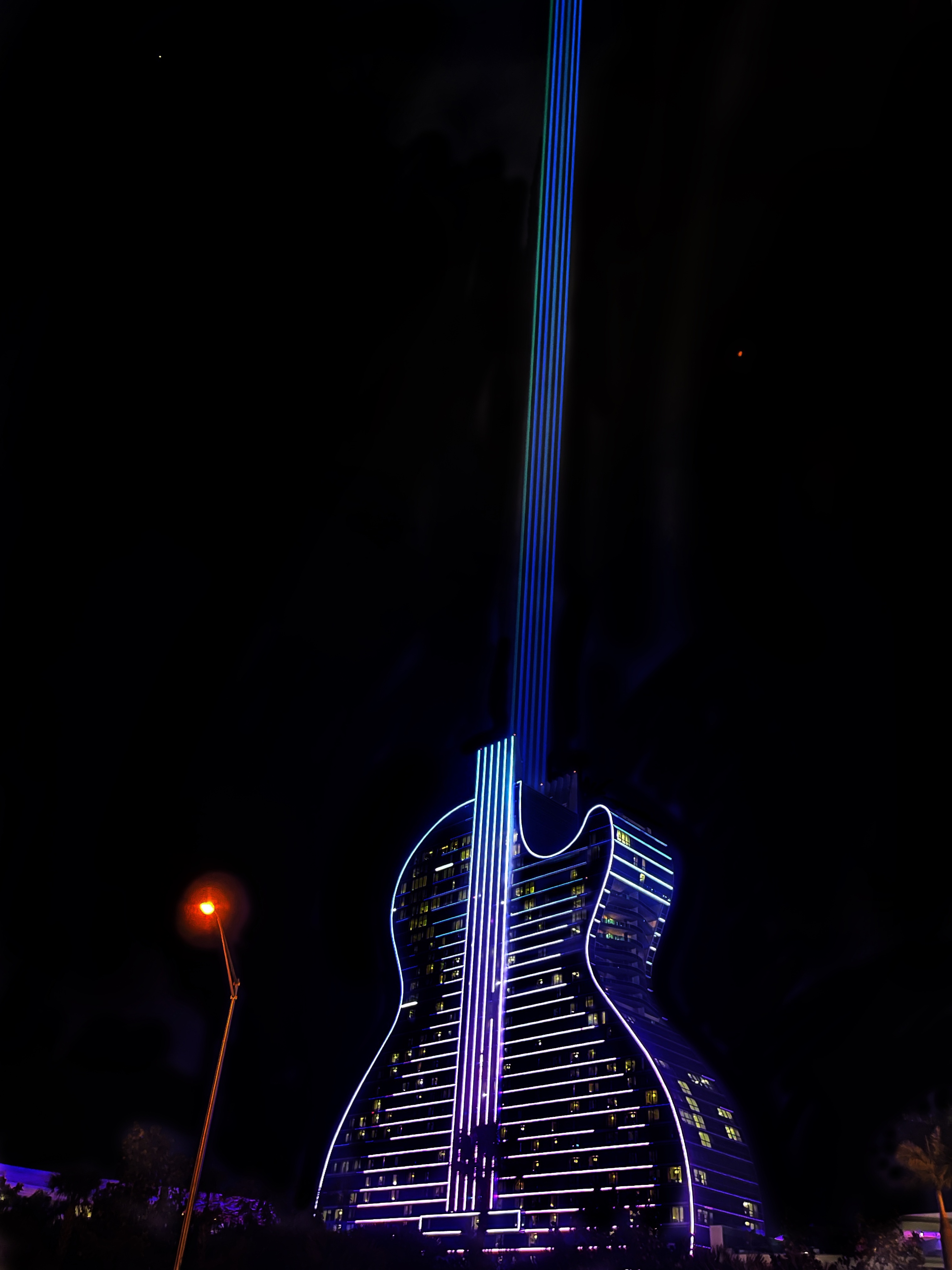
Guitar Hotel at night (November 2020)

As of June 2019, the resort has the 12-story "classic" Hard Rock Hotel with 469 guest rooms and suites. Guests are greeted by a 50-foot (15 m) tall signature Hard Rock guitar—based on a Gibson electric guitar model—at the entrance of the hotel, along with a massive LED advertising screen at the front of the main parking garage. The resort has 120,000-square-foot (11,000 m^{2}) of meeting space, including a 38,000-square-foot (3,500 m^{2}) exhibit hall.

The Hard Rock's $1.3 billion property expansion project added a 450-foot (140 m) tower designed to appear as a pair of guitars, back-to-back, with lights providing the imagery of guitar strings and 638 rooms alongside the seven-story, 168-room Oasis Tower overlooking the pool cabanas—all scheduled to open on October 24, 2019, several months in advance of Super Bowl LIV being held in Miami on February 2, 2020.

The expansion also included the 42,000-square-foot (3,900 m^{2}) Rock Spa & Salon, and over 20 new dining and nightlife destinations. Between the existing 12-story hotel, new Guitar Hotel, and new Oasis Tower, over 1,200 hotel rooms became available in October 2019. As of March 2019, the tribe's upgrade budget was significantly increased to over $2.4 billion, split mainly between this location and the Seminole Hard Rock Hotel & Casino Tampa.

=== Hard Rock Casino ===
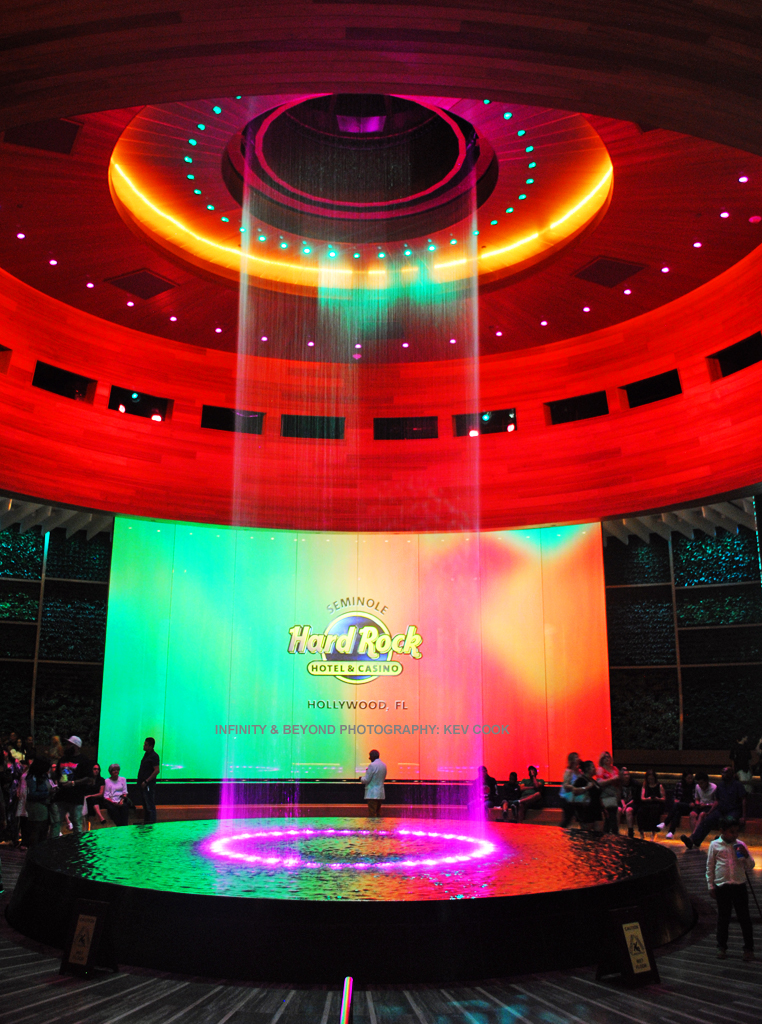
The Oculus (November 2019)

As of December 2018, the casino layout covers over 140,000 sq ft (13,000 m^{2}) featuring slot machines and various table games including blackjack, baccarat, mini baccarat, Pai Gow poker, Let It Ride and three card poker. In December 2023, the Seminole Tribe entered into another gaming compact authorizing live Crap and Roulette gambling, live sports betting, as well as allowing for additional expansion of two more properties in Hollywood. As of June 2018, the poker room was located in a former ballroom area, relocated from Seminole Paradise due to ongoing construction work. During the expansion, the casino was also modernized with updated HVAC and additional memorabilia.

Blackjack was an addition to the casino. In a deal valued at $1.1 billion, former Governor Charlie Crist gave the Seminole Tribe a license for blackjack in its casinos. In exchange, The Seminole Tribe loaned the State of Florida $1.1 billion over the course of two years. On July 3, 2008, the Florida Supreme Court ruled that the governor's agreement was unconstitutional, but table games continue to operate because the Federal Department of the Interior approved the now-invalid pact with the state. The addition of blackjack to the Hard Rock casinos in Hollywood and Tampa gave credibility to its claim of being a major gambling destination.

=== Restaurants, shopping, and entertainment ===
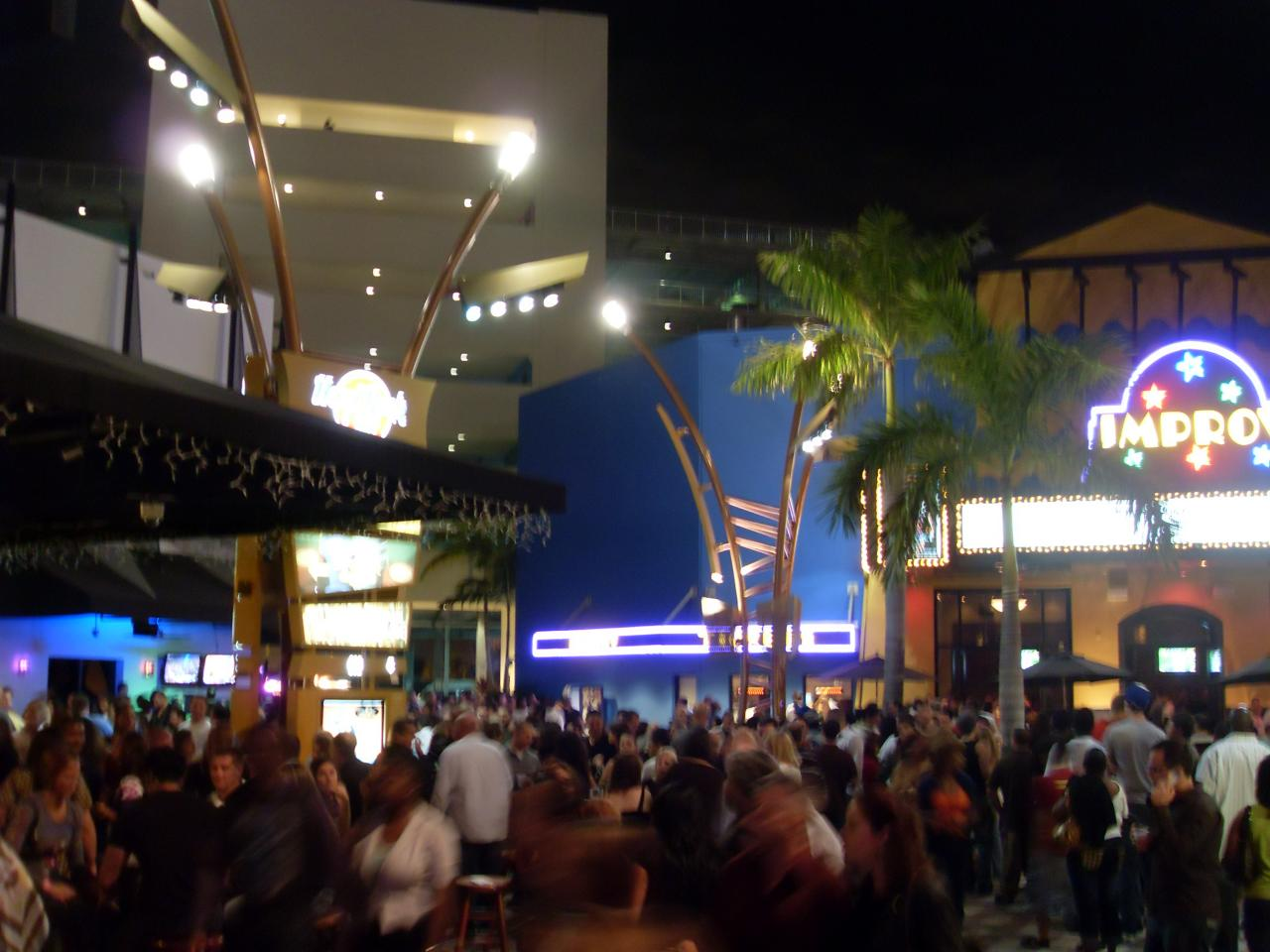
Paradise Shops at night with the Improv Comedy Club on the right (November 2008)

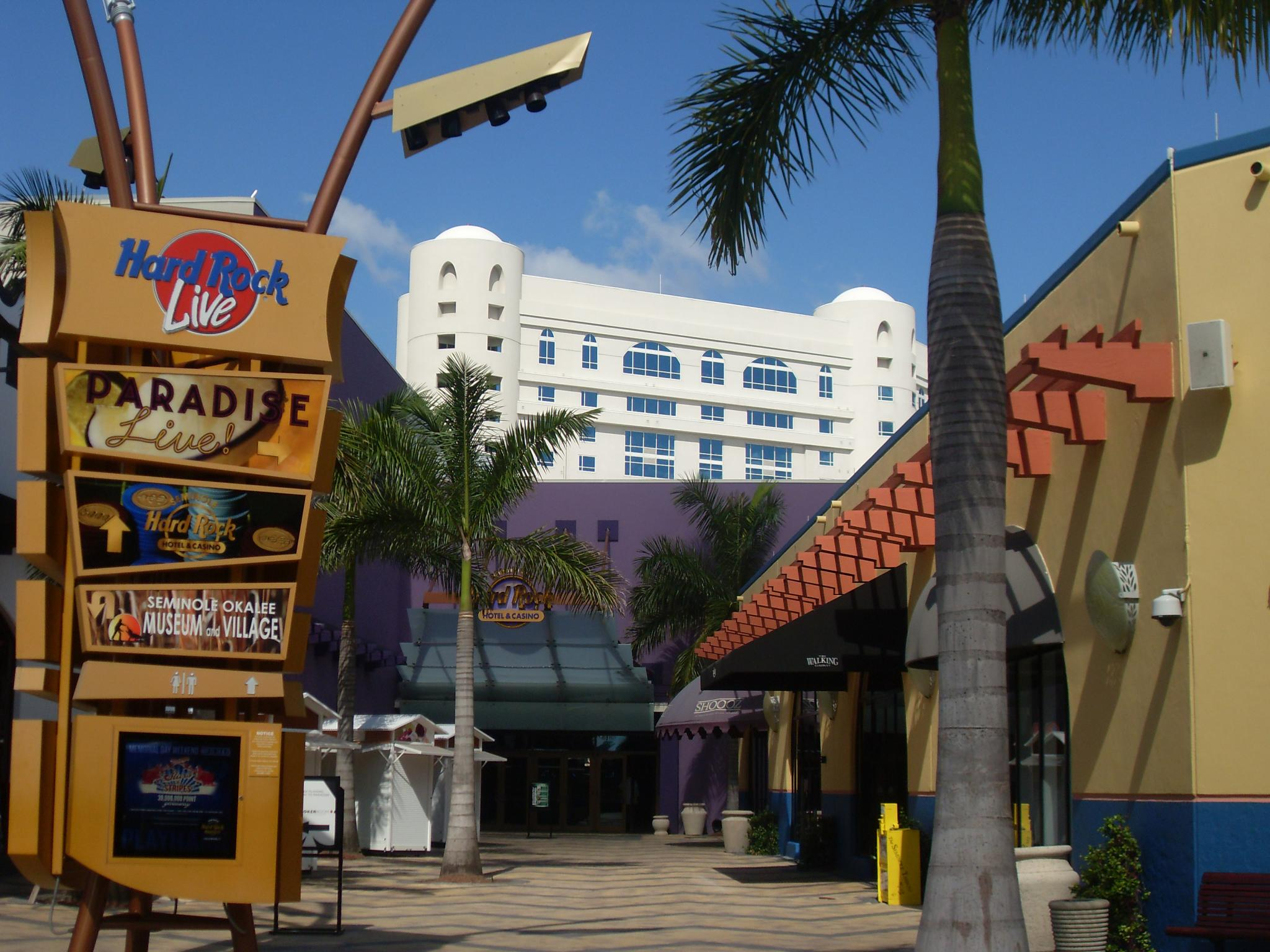
Main entrance to Seminole Paradise (May 2009)

By February 23, 2005 with the introduction of Tequila Ranch, followed by Cuban Café, Martorano's, and the Improv Comedy Club, an 350,000-square-foot (33,000 m^{2}) open-air shopping plaza and entertainment complex in Mediterranean Revival architecture known as Seminole Paradise, also known as Paradise Shops, had its grand opening at the resort on January 14, 2005 with the appearance of Dan Marino, former quarterback for the Miami Dolphins and featuring the 5,500-seat Hard Rock Live concert venue which opened on July 12 of that year.

Seminole Paradise also featured the smaller, 400-seat Paradise Live! theater. However, to make room for the Guitar Hotel, Seminole Paradise permanently closed its doors on March 31, 2017 and immediately began demolition. All of its tenants were evicted. Hard Rock Live was also razed in March 2018 as part of the expansion and hosted different types of events including musical acts, comedians, mixed martial arts, boxing and other smaller events, along with a residency by Billy Joel, and was replaced with the larger 7,000-seat Hard Rock Live as part of the expansion and opened on October 24, 2019 with a concert from Maroon 5 the following day. During construction of the new theater, events were held at the temporary 3,500-seat Hard Rock Event Center.

Seminole Paradise was replaced with The Shoppes at The Guitar Hotel, a 26,000-square-foot (2,400 m^{2}) enclosed retail promenade serving as the physical connector between the Lucky Street Parking Garage and the main resort. The new mall features the 24-hour Hard Rock Store. During the $1.5 billion expansion, the 21,000-square-foot (2,000 m^{2}) DAER Dayclub & Nightclub would be added to the resort, featuring notable artists like Marshmello, and a capacity of over 3,000. Cipresso closed in July 2026, as the Seminoles have partnered with Major Food Group for new concepts.

=== Miss Universe 2020 ===
The 69th edition of the Miss Universe competition, was held on May 16, 2021, at the Seminole Hard Rock Hotel & Casino where Zozibini Tunzi of South Africa crowned her successor Andrea Meza of Mexico at the end of the event.

== Notable incidents ==
=== 2007: Death of Anna N. Smith ===
Model Anna Nicole Smith, who was staying at the resort, died in her hotel suite on February 8, 2007. An autopsy ruled her death was caused by an "accidental drug overdose" from prescription drugs.

=== Spring 2026 shooting ===
Rapper Offset was shot in the valet area of the resort on April 6, 2026, and suffered a non-life-threatening injury. He was quickly transported to Memorial Regional Hospital.

That evening, Tione Merritt, commonly known as Lil Tjay, was arrested in connection with the shooting and released the following day. Offset was released from the hospital four days after the shooting.

=== Summer 2026 cabana frame damage ===
On the evening of June 21, 2026, a sudden gust of wind lifted a large metal cabana frame and crashed it into the pool area at the DAER rooftop venue, causing five people to be sent to the Memorial Regional Hospital with non-life-threatening injuries. Videos shown bystanders and staff rushing to lift the partially collapsed structure off of trapped guests before emergency responders arrived. The incident highlighted concerns regarding secure outdoor equipment at other resorts and recreational attractions during inclement weather.

== See also ==
- Hard Rock Hotel and Casino (Las Vegas)
- Hard Rock Hotel & Casino Atlantic City, which was also designed by the Las Vegas, Nevada-based Klai Juba Wald
- Peter Morton
- Live! Casino & Hotel Maryland, also developed by Cordish in Anne Arundel County
- List of casinos in Florida
- List of integrated resorts

| Preceded by Tyler Perry Studios (United States) Atlanta, GA | Miss Universe venue 2020 | Succeeded by Universe Dome, Port of Eilat (Israel) Eilat |
