= Seminole Hard Rock Hotel and Casino Tampa =

Integrated resort in Hillsborough County, Florida, U.S.

Coordinates: 27.993549°N 82.372806°W

Seminole Hard Rock Hotel & Casino Tampa

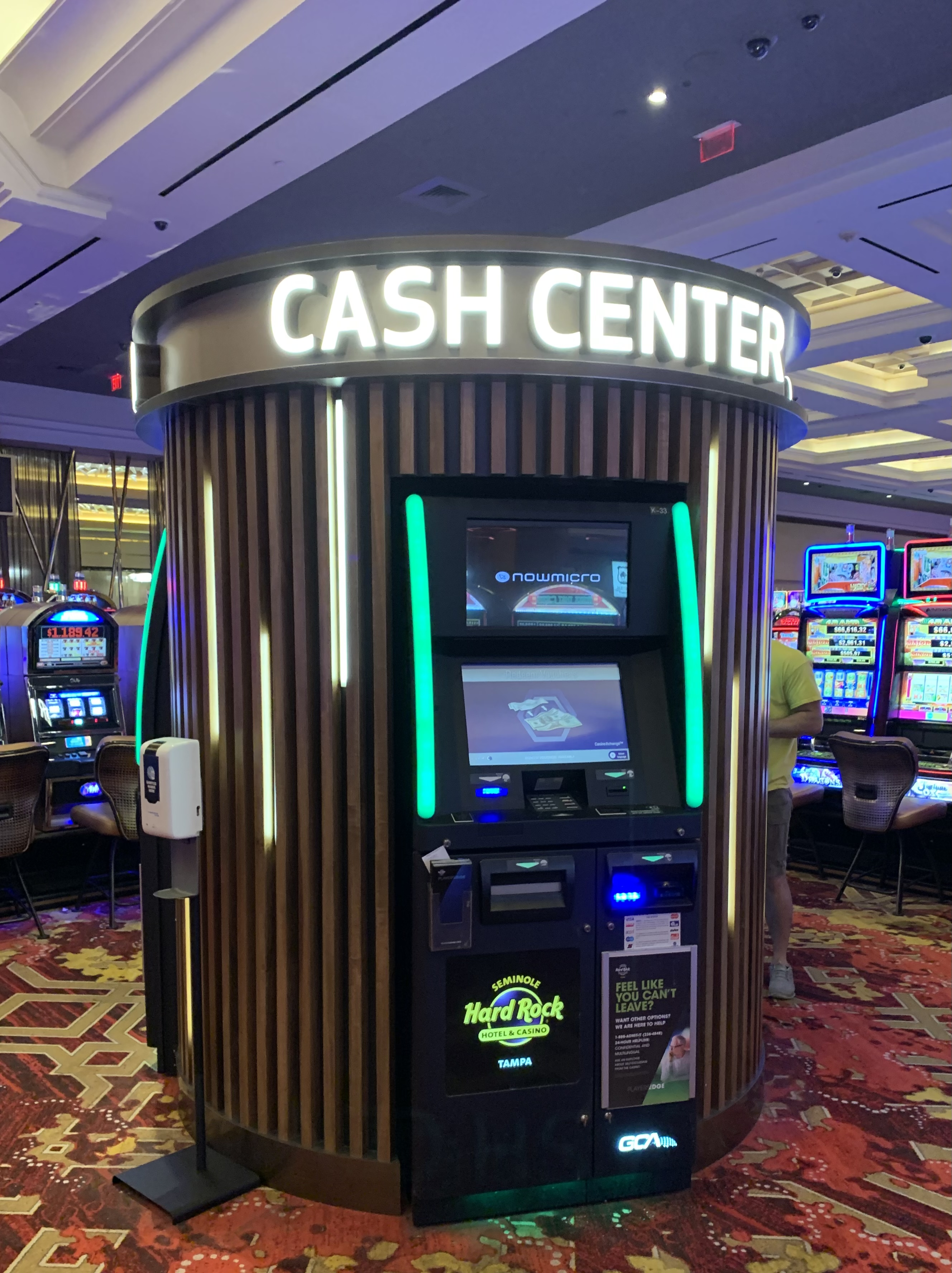
- Interior view (August 2022)
- Interactive map of Seminole Hard Rock Hotel & Casino Tampa
- Location: Tampa, Florida, U.S.; 5223 North Orient Road Tampa Reservation, 33610
- Opened: June 1998; 28 years ago (as Four Points Sheraton Hotel); March 11, 2004; 22 years ago (main resort); October 3, 2019; 7 years ago (expansion)
- Theme: Rock and roll
- No. of rooms: approx. 802
- Gaming space: 245,000 square feet (22,800 m^{2}) ranked 4th
- Signature attractions: Hard Rock Event Center
- Notable restaurants: Hard Rock Cafe; Council Oak Steaks & Seafood; Fresh Harvest Buffet
- Casino type: Land-based
- Owner: Seminole Gaming (Seminole Tribe of Florida)
- Operating license holder: Hard Rock International
- Architect: Klai Juba Wald Architecture + Interiors
- Previous names: Four Points Sheraton Hotel (1998–2004)
- Renovated in: May 2002 – March 11, 2004; September 13, 2011 – July 2, 2012; May 30, 2018 – October 3, 2019
- Website: casino.hardrock.com/tampa
- Building details

Design and construction
- Developer: The Cordish Companies and Coastal Development, LLC (under Power Plant Entertainment, LLC)
- Main contractor: Tutor Perini Building Corp.

Renovating team
- Main contractor: Suffolk-Yates

Other information
- Number of stores: 8 in Shops (at peak)
- Parking: Free and valet parking in three parking garages: Winner's Way Garage; Lucky Street Garage; Draper Place Garage; Orient Road Garage

The Seminole Hard Rock Hotel & Casino Tampa is an integrated resort that opened in March 2004. It is located on the Tampa Reservation off of Interstate 4, just east of Tampa, Florida. The resort has been expanded multiple times since its opening, bringing the total gaming floor to 245,000 square feet (22,800 m^{2}), and it being one of the largest casinos in the world. It is a 24-hour venue that permits smoking indoors.

It includes many displays of rock and roll memorabilia, such as clothing and musical instruments. Rock videos and music play on multiple screens, including one displayed inside a waterfall. Many song lyrics are displayed on the walls. Among its many services are a food court and tour bus parking. As of August 2026, the resort is undergoing an expansion to add smoke-free areas.

== History ==
=== Background ===
In 1980, workers were excavating to build a parking garage in downtown Tampa, and discovered Indian remains of the Fort Brooke military reservation and Native American burial site. They were exhumed and relocated to 8.3 acres (3.4 ha) of land east of Tampa off Interstate 4 and Orient Road, which was granted reservation status to the Seminole Tribe of Florida in 1981, forming the Tampa Reservation. Taking advantage of reservation status, the tribe opened the Coo Taun Cho Bee Museum, a smoke shop, and Seminole Bingo Palace, a high-stakes bingo hall by 1982.

=== 2000–2004: Planning, construction, and opening ===
Eventually, a Four Points Sheraton Hotel opened on the land in June 1998, and on June 16, 2000, the Seminole Tribal Council approved the proposal to take over management and renovate the hotel, alongside updates to the Bingo Palace. That year, CEO David S. Cordish of the Baltimore, Maryland-based Cordish Companies partnered with Chief Jim Billie of the Seminole Tribe, and formed an affiliate in collaboration with Coastal Development, LLC, known as Power Plant Entertainment, LLC. After several negotiations and background checks, the tribe officially signed two major contracts with the Cordish Cos. in July of that year, which included an agreement to redevelop the Four Points Sheraton Hotel in Tampa, and build a casino hotel in Hollywood, Florida, with a "financial services engagement letter" to support project funding.

Power Plant Entertainment and the Seminole Tribe announced that the Tampa and Hollywood resorts would use the Hard Rock name, via a partnership with Hard Rock Cafe International, Inc. and its then-parent company, The Rank Group Plc. The Four Points Sheraton Hotel was originally planned for a $2 million renovation, but the Seminoles hoped to complete the $3.55 million conversion to Hard Rock before the 2001 Super Bowl would start at Raymond James Stadium. Groundbreaking took place on January 8, 2001, and the Orlando-based Hard Rock Cafe would run the trademark restaurants, retail shops, and music memorabilia curation, while operation the gaming floors were handled by the tribe. However, work was delayed when the Seminole Tribal Council voted to suspend Jim Billie in mid-2001, and general tribal voting over the summer of that year adjusted the exact terms of the Cordish deal, intentionally extending the projected construction timeline by an extra six months.

Financing for the projects was secured via the sale of $315 million worth of Capital Trust Agency Revenue bonds in May 2002 to physically break ground. The final proposal for the Tampa Reservation site included a 90,000-square-foot (8,400 m^{2}) casino floor with 1,500 slot machines and 50 gaming tables, a 250-room hotel tower, and the total layout would house 10 restaurants, including a flagship Hard Rock Cafe. The total combined budget for both Florida resorts was $450 million. Perini-Suitt, a joint venture (now Tutor Perini Building Corp.) managed construction, while the architect for the integrated resort was Klai Juba of Las Vegas, Nevada.

The Seminole Hard Rock Hotel & Casino officially opened its doors to the public on March 11, 2004, marking it as the second Hard Rock Hotel & Casino location after the March 1995 debut of the separately-operated Las Vegas property. The opening included Cordish representatives and Hard Rock executives participating in a synchronized guitar-smashing ceremony, which is the historic ceremonial trademark used by Hard Rock International when they open a major venue. The Flying Elvi, a 10-member group of Elvis Presley impersonators, famously parachuted from an altitude of 10,000 feet (3,000 m), performing aerial maneuvers before landing on the property to declare the "King" of entertainment has arrived in Tampa. Back-to-back concerts were headlined by the multi-Grammy-winning rock band Hootie & the Blowfish, and guests flooded the $100 million resort to see the music memorabilia and flagship, single-story cafe. Within the resort's first year of operation, it approached $500 million of combined revenue alongside its Hollywood sister, which opened later on May 11 of that year. Both casinos had to utilize "Class II" video bingo machines, working and looking like Vegas slot machines, as the state had not yet signed a formal table game compact with the tribe at the time.

=== 2004–2010: Contract dispute and acquisition battle ===
The Seminole Tribe filed a lawsuit Power Plant Entertainment in federal court to completely void their original agreement in October 2005, calling it an "illegal and unconscionable contract" and alleging that the payout structure, which made them pay the developers 30% of net gaming profits over 10 years and 30% of hotel profits over 15, was ultimately forcing them to pay Cordish $2.2 billion "for doing absolutely nothing" after the properties were completed. However, The Cordish Companies bypassed the federal Indian Gaming Regulatory Act (IGRA) caps, as the original agreement in 2000 granted them the development and consultant rights, without being allowed to operate the resorts. Via an announcement on May 23, 2006, the Seminoles would keep paying Cordish until a settlement happens.

Then, on December 7, 2006, the Seminole Tribe announced that they would purchase Hard Rock Cafe International from the Rank Group for $965 million. The Cordish Companies, furious regarding the previous contract dispute, filed a countersuit for collusion and bid-rigging against the tribe and Hard Rock on January 3, 2007, arguing that they and Goldman Sachs & Co., their financial backer, were locked out of the deal as Rank and the Seminoles negotiated for seven months, securing promises that the management would stay in place and receiving additional financial incentives after the buyout, while Cordish was planning to offer Rank a higher purchase price to acquire the brand.

A financial settlement was reached on March 2 of that year, with S&P Global Ratings disclosing that the Seminole Tribe agreed to loan Power Plant Entertainment $525 million and pay them $10.5 million annually for 22 years. On April 19 of that year, all claims by the Seminoles and Cordish were relinquished, with the tribe acknowledging the original developer fees as "fair and equitable," while Cordish dropped their accusations of big-rigging, stating they determined that no collusion happened, allowing the tribe to complete its purchase of Hard Rock and combine it under a single parent company called Hard Rock International.

=== 2011–2019: Success and expansion ===
On July 2, 2012, the Seminole Hard Rock became the 6th largest casino in the world, and the 4th largest in the U.S. after completing a $75 million expansion that added 32,000 square feet (3,000 m^{2}) of gaming space, bringing the total floor capacity to 190,000 square feet (18,000 m^{2}). The expansion was announced on September 13, 2011 and would be designed by Klai Juba, alongside Cleo Design for the interior and Turner Construction as the main contractor. The new restaurant added in this expansion was Rise Kitchen & Bakery. In December of that year, the resort would add the Asian-themed Jubao Palace gaming area.

On June 1, 2016, another expansion was announced, which would cost $700 million. Construction started on May 30, 2018, which would add a new 15-story, 564-room hotel known as the East Tower, 800 guestrooms with 79 suites, bringing the total of suites to 88. 700 new parking spaces would be added, increasing the total to approximately 6,000. A new Hard Rock Event Center would be added. The Hollywood location was also undergoing an expansion to add a guitar-shaped hotel tower, bringing the investment for both expansions to $2.4 billion. The expansion debuted on October 3, 2019, with another signature guitar-smashing ceremony led by Hard Rock International Chairman and Seminole Gaming CEO Jim Allen and the appearance of "King of the High Wire" Nik Wallenda alongside his 66-year-old mother, Delilah, performing a synchronized high-wire walk between the two hotels and hovering over the expanded pool deck. The expansion was designed by Klai Juba Wald Architects, formerly just Klai Juba, while construction was handled by joint venture Suffolk-Yates.

=== 2020–present ===
The resort would reopen on May 21, 2020 under its "Safe + Sound" social distancing guidelines, implemented as a result of the COVID-19 pandemic. In 2021, the Seminole Tribe signed a historic 30-year gaming compact with Florida Governor Ron DeSantis. In May 2024, the resort celebrated its 20th anniversary, with a total donation of $400,000. Announced on August 10, 2026, the resort plans to undergo a floor renovation by October, replacing chairs, carpets, ceiling treatments, and table game felts from the Elvis piano display all the way down to the Cipresso restaurant, as well as L Bar and hotel lobby.

== Features ==
=== Hotels and amenities ===
The Hard Rock Hotel has a 12-story tower, a pool, a fitness center, and three parking garages. The Orient Road Garage opened in late April 2017, connected to the property's 26,000-square-foot (2,400 m^{2}) Mezzanine Level Casino.

As part of the 2019 expansion, a 14-story hotel tower was added to the property. 240 rooms were renovated in January 2025. On February 22, 2021, Hard Rock International partnered with Hakeem Investments, planning to open another hotel adjacent to the Seminole Hard Rock under the REVERB by Hard Rock brand, called REVERB Tampa East, which initially had a projected opening date of 2023. However, as of February 2021, the project has remained abandoned without any reasons provided by the developers.

=== Hard Rock Casino ===
As of January 2025, the casino layout features a 245,000-square-foot (22,800 m^{2}) gaming floor after completing a $65 million expansion, which added 350 slot machines.

Announced on June 2, 2026, the Hard Rock Event Center would temporarily be rebranded as the Hard Rock Event Center Casino during its smoke-free renovations. Construction on the temporary conversion started by August 11 of that year, with a targeted opening date of late September, inheriting 682 slots and 34 tables from the existing gaming area. Floor renovations are scheduled to start in October, and 243 slot machines would be added to the main resort, bringing the total number of games to 6,185.

=== Restaurants, shopping and entertainment ===
Grey Salt, which was ran by Marc Murphy, closed permanently in February 2017 after approximately two years of operation, as to Hard Rock, it did not fit the blueprints for the property's upcoming expansion. The Rez Grill had a soft opening on December 14 of that year, followed by a grand opening on the weekend of January 5, 2018.

On October 3, 2019, the Seminole Hard Rock Event Center, part of the property's expansion, began operations with a concert from Keith Urban. Shops at Seminole Hard Rock Tampa also debuted with 5,000 square feet (460 m^{2}) of retail space compared to The Shoppes at The Guitar Hotel, with both malls featuring the Hard Rock Store and the Rock Shop. Fresh Harvest Buffet reopened in January 2025 after being shut down due to the pandemic.

== See also ==
- Hard Rock Las Vegas
- Hard Rock Hotel & Casino Atlantic City, which was also designed by the Las Vegas, Nevada-based Klai Juba Wald
- Peter Morton
- Live! Casino & Hotel Maryland, also developed by Cordish in Anne Arundel County
- List of casinos in Florida
- List of integrated resorts
