= South Side School (Fort Lauderdale, Florida) =

- U.S. National Register of Historic Places
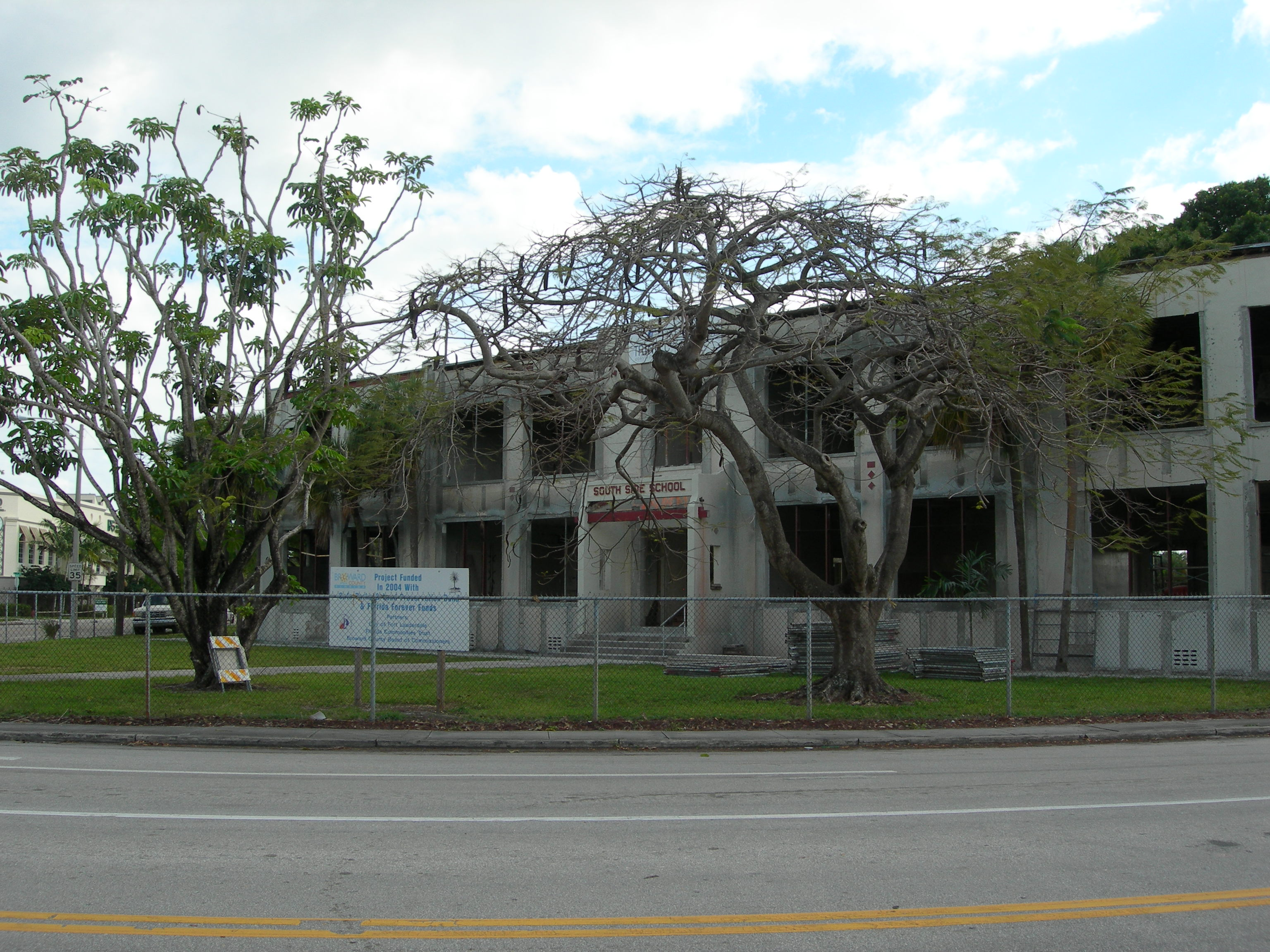
- South Side School in 2008, while a reconstruction project is in progress.
- Location: Fort Lauderdale, Florida, United States
- Coordinates: 26°06′45.45″N 80°08′36.67″W
- Built: 1922
- Built by: Cayot and Hart
- Architect: John Peterman
- NRHP reference No.: 06000617
- Added to NRHP: 19 July 2006

The South Side School is a historic U.S. school in Fort Lauderdale, Florida. It is located at 701 South Andrews Avenue. On July 19, 2006, it was added to the U.S. National Register of Historic Places. South Side School opened in 1922 due to the Florida land boom of the 1920s. The architect of the South Side School was John Peterman and the builder was Cayot and Hart. In 1949 the school was expanded, it was enlarged again in 1954. South Side School was changed from an elementary school in 1967 to be a school for special needs children. In 1990s the school was closed. The school became a city-designated historic landmark in 1996. Although the city hopes to turn the building into a cultural arts center, the renovation has encountered several setbacks.
