= Hollywood Reservation =

- Indian reservation
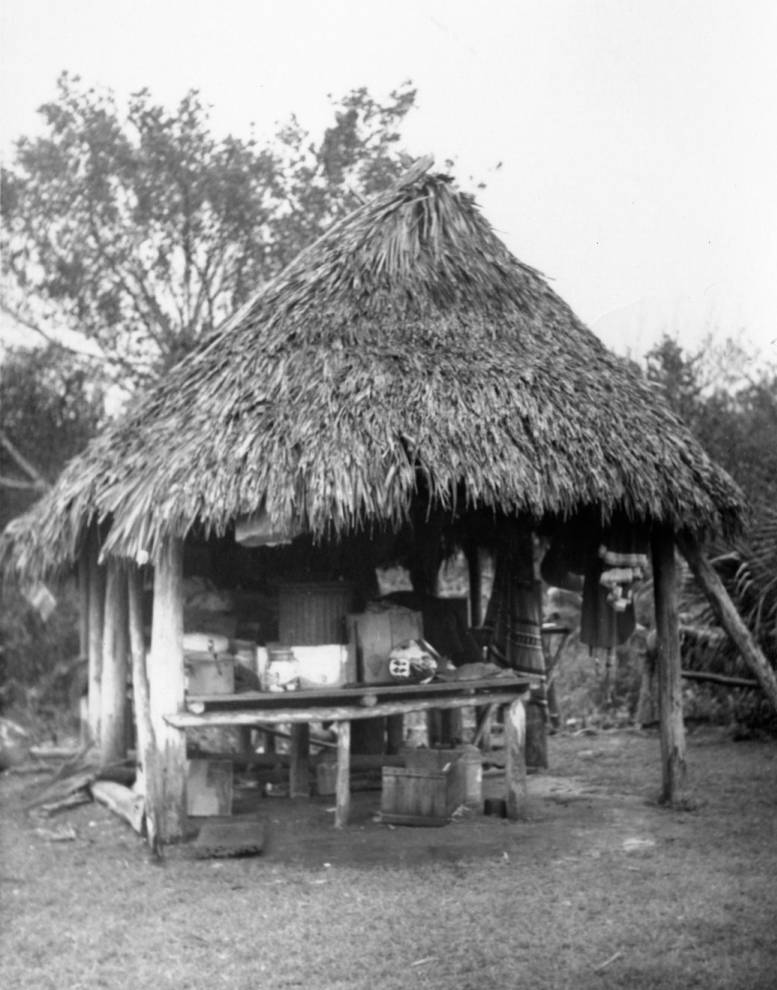
- A chickee on the reservation in 1960

- Location of Hollywood Reservation
- Coordinates: 26°02′32″N 80°12′45″W
- Tribe: Seminole
- Country: United States
- State: Florida
- County: Broward

Area
  - Total: 2.01 km^{2} (0.78 sq mi)

Population (1990)
  - Total: 481
- Website: Seminole Tribe of Florida

Hollywood Reservation, formerly known as the Dania Reservation, is one of six Seminole Indian reservations governed by the federally recognized Seminole Tribe of Florida, located near Hollywood, Florida. The reservation is bordered by the communities of Hollywood and Davie, in Broward County. The reservation is 497 acres (2.01 km^{2}) in size.

== Economic Development ==
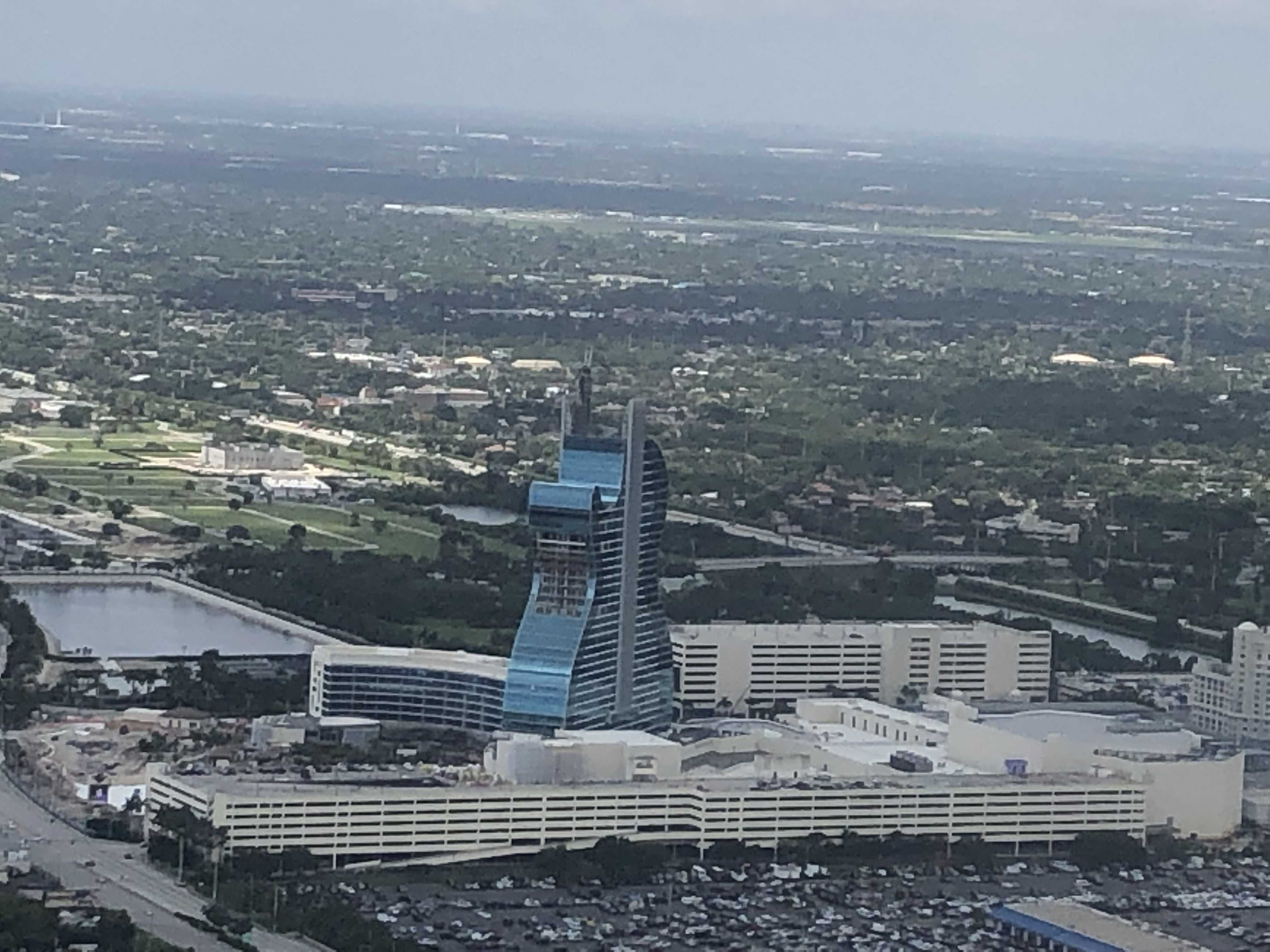
Seminole Hard Rock Hotel & Casino Hollywood

The Seminole Hard Rock Hotel and Casino Hollywood is located on the reservation.
