= Billy Osceola =

Seminole leader in Florida, U.S. (1920–1974)

- Billy Osceola, first chief (position later called chairman) of the Seminole Tribe of Florida in traditional native garb

Seminole Tribe of Florida leader
- In office 1957–1966

1st Tribal Council Chairman

Personal details
- Born: July 4, 1920 Everglades, Broward County, Florida
- Died: August 1, 1974 (aged 54) Boynton Beach, Florida
- Spouse: Sally Tiger(1923-1987)
- Mother tongue: Mikasuki language

Billy Osceola (July 4, 1920 – August 1, 1974) was the first elected chief of the Seminole Tribe of Florida. He became an ordained minister and was extremely influential in shifting the Seminole Tribe of Florida from traditional spiritual practices to the Baptist faith. He was the first elected chairman of the tribe after their 1957 reorganization.

== Early life ==
Billy Osceola was born 4 July 1920 in the Everglades to Jimmy and Nancy Osceola. He grew up in the area that would become the Brighton Reservation. His mother died soon after he was born and his father returned to his clan who lived near Big Cypress, but the children remained in Brighton with their grandmother. Billy's native tongue was the Muscogee language (though his father spoke Mikasuki) and Billy did not learn to speak English until he started school in 1938 at the age of 18.

Homes were not permanent, but rather camps of chickees. The chickee was an open-sided structure with corner support posts of cypress or palm logs, to which was secured a sleeping platform with a thatched roof of palmetto fronds. These chickee camps were arranged according to matrilineal clans and multiple living units surrounded a shared central cooking chickee. Well suited to climate, they could be moved in hunting or farming seasons. As Osceola described his youth, sometimes they lived in a temporary camp in Indiantown, sometimes in Brighton, and only occasionally with his father on Big Cypress where his father raised corn, sweet potatoes and a lot of pumpkin.

Osceola's first job was working with the Civilian Conservation Corps clearing farmland around Brighton and putting up fences. After they cleared the farmland, the Native Americans working with the CCC then went on to build roads. After he married, because his wife was from Big Cypress, Billy worked on roads in that area.

In 1943, a young pastor, Stanley Smith, arrived on the Dania (now Hollywood) Reservation to assist the Southern Baptist Church leadership. Smith was dynamic and inspired many local Seminole to join the congregation. One of those young converts was Billy Osceola, who joined the church in 1945 and through the assistance of Smith, was able to obtain a scholarship to go to bible college. On 29 September 1946, a group of five Seminole youths, Josie Billie, Junior Buster, Barfield Johns, Billy Osceola, and Samuel Tommie began attending the Florida Bible Institute in Lakeland, Florida and returned as ministers causing a fracture in the church. Osceola's cousin, Bill Osceola became ordained as a deacon in 1945 and became a lay minister in 1950. When Smith's group split from the Southern Baptists, Bill established the Mekusukey Independent Baptist Church in Hollywood, Billy however, established a congregation in 1952 on the edge of the Brighton Reservation and began his work as a full gospel ordained minister. Bill and Billy often shared pastoral duties, though they were from different Baptist organizations and both Independent and Southern Baptists had congregations on all three Seminole reservations—Dania, Big Cypress and Brighton.

== Tribal organization ==
In 1953, the Seminole were advised they were on the Congressional list for tribal termination and loss of federal benefits, under the federal Indian termination policy. Being proposed for termination galvanized the tribe into action. On 9 October 1953, an emergency meeting was called at the agency headquarters on the Dania Reservation (now the Hollywood Reservation). There were two issues to be considered: 1) convincing the government that the tribe was not ready to take over management of its own affairs and 2) convincing the government that all native people living in Florida were not Seminole.

From 1–2 March 1954 Osceola and other tribal members testified at a Joint Hearing before the Subcommittees of the Committee on Interior and Insular Affairs of the 83rd Congress. On 4 April 1955, the tribe created a board of directors with the intent of forming a tribal organization before the Clewiston hearings which would begin in two days. From 6–7 April 1955, hearings were held and again Osceola and tribe representatives plead for the continuance of federal government supervision for the next 25 years and separation of the Seminoles from the Miccosukee tribe and Traditional Indians.

By 26 March 1957 a committee, under the chairmanship of Bill Osceola had been formed to draft a constitution and corporate charter. The Constitutional Committee members were: Billy Osceola and John Henry Gopher (Brighton), Bill Osceola and Jack Willie (Dania), Jimmie O. Osceola and Frank J. Billie (Big Cypress), and Larry Mike Osceola (Trail, but not of the Trail faction). Once the documents were prepared meetings were held on each reservation to discuss them with the tribespeople. The constitution and bylaws were accepted by tribal vote on 21 August 1957 by a vote of 241 for and 5 against.

The first officers elected in 1957 for the Seminole tribe were Billy Osceola, Tribal Chairman; Betty Mae Jumper, vice chairman; Laura Mae Osceola, secretary; and the non-Indian wife of an agency employee as treasurer. These officers selected their business officers: Frank Billie, president and Bill Osceola, vice president; however, Billie resigned and Bill Osceola served as first president.

One of the most pressing issues, after the official tribal organization was the settling of the Indian Claims Commission cases and Billy worked with the tribe's new attorney Roy L. Struble of Miami to reach a final settlement. In 1962 when the Miccosukee Tribe of Indians of Florida organized their tribe and gained federal recognition, they sought to intervene in the case. Unlike the Seminole who wanted a monetary settlement, the Miccosukee wanted land, not a reservation, which they had been offered previously, but clear title to 160,000 acres of land in the Everglades west of Miami.

An inability for the tribe to pay Osceola a salary led to his resignation in November, 1966. In fact from 1957-1971, the only paid position in the Seminole government was the office of the president.

== After Politics ==
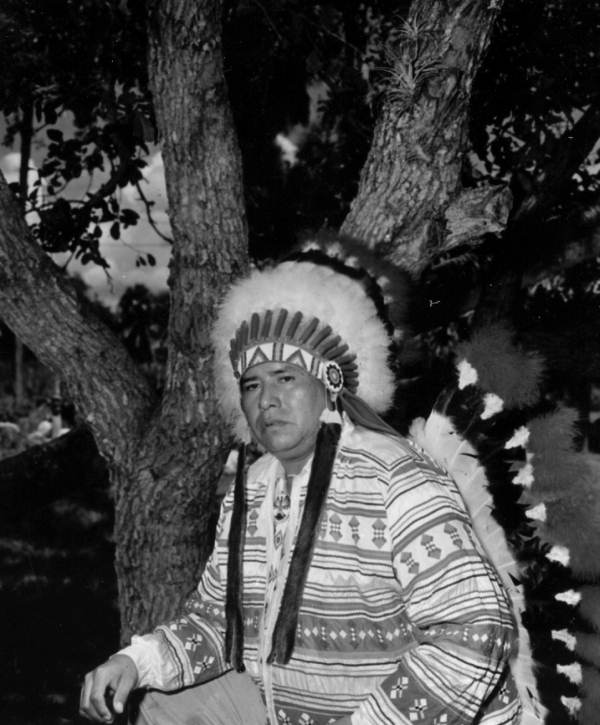
Image of Seminole Tribe Chairman Billy Osceola in traditional headdress

After resigning as chairman, Osceola became the leader of the tribe's Community Action Program, a federally funded initiative which included the Head Start Program, an early education intervention for disadvantaged youth. By 1967, he reported that Head Start was being offered to 2 to 5 year-olds on the Brighton, Big Cypress and Dania (now Hollywood) Reservations and that the children were making good progress with English. Osceola traveled throughout the state studying programs to alleviate poverty and assist students to bring down the 95% drop-out rate that existed at that time for the tribe. One of the biggest problems was the limited English spoken.

== Personal life and descendants ==
In 1940, Billy married Sally Tiger (15 November 1923 - February 1987) in a Green Corn Ceremony. His brother selected her from Big Cypress and Billy had met her only once before. They had two sons Jesse Osceola (31 October 1941 - March 1982), Fred Junior Osceola (23 September 1943 - 9 March 2001). Fred's obituary listed another brother and a sister: Glenn Emmons Osceola (13 September 1960) and Penny Lee Osceola Jimmie (16 January 1962 - 13 December 2011). His son Jesse Osceola married Anne Doctor of the Miccosukee Tribe and had a son Nathan Dean Doctor (10 June 1967 - 17 September 2021) Jesse had one other son before his marriage with Anne; Arthur Rory Thompson (Cir. 1960-) Descendants known; Nikko Dakota Doctor (12 July 2005-)

Billy died 1 August 1974 in Boynton Beach, Florida.
