= Josie Billie =

- Katcha Nokofti
- Billie at Florida Folk Festival, c. 1970
- Born: December 12, 1887
- Died: February 26, 1980 (aged 92)
- Education: Florida Baptist Institute
- Occupations: Seminole medicine man and Baptist minister
- Spouse: Lucy Tiger
- Parents: Connie Pajo (father); Little Nancy Osceola (mother)

Josie Billie (12 December 1887 – 26 February 1980) was a Mikasuki-speaking Seminole medicine man, doctor, and Baptist preacher. Billie was a member of the Panther clan of the Seminoles in southern Florida. He actively collaborated with American anthropologists and researchers like Ethel Cutler Freeman, Frances Densmore, Robert Greenlee, Robert Solenberger (on behalf of anthropologist Frank G. Speck) and William Sturtevant. Billie served as a public spokesman for the Florida Seminoles and created recordings of traditional folk songs and information about the traditional Seminole religion. As of 2017, his camp is part of the Tribal Register of Historic Places.

== Early life ==
Josie Billie (Katcha Nokofti) was born on December 12, 1887 to Connie Pajo (Ko-nip-ha-tco) and Little Nancy Osceola. Connie Pajo was also known as Billie Cornpatch. Josie Billie is known to have one brother, Ingraham Billie, who also became a well-known Seminole medicine man. Billie was married to Lucy Tiger (Seminole, 1901–1983).

Josie Billie lived on the Big Cypress Indian Reservation in Hendry County, Florida. The Big Cypress Swamp was originally isolated, but in 1928 a highway was constructed through the swamp to connect Tampa and Miami. This construction and the opening of the Tamiami trail threatened the isolation of the Mikasuki-speaking Seminoles. In response, the Bureau of Indian Affairs created a reservation where the Everglades and the Big Cypress Swamp meet, roughly 42,000 acres where the Mikasuki-speaking Seminoles and the Muscogee-speaking Seminoles lived after they were removed from the drainable land near the Tamiami Trail. Billie resided on this reservation for his entire life.

== Career ==
Billie was as an influential medicine man among the Florida Seminole. While women, like Annie Tommie, gained knowledge of healing herbs and cared for the physical ills of people in the community, medicine men cared for both physical and spiritual ills. The role of medicine man, or the keeper of the medicine bundle, holds significant political and judicial authority at the annual Green Corn Dance. In 1944, when anthropologist Robert Greenlee conducted fieldwork among the Mikasuki-speaking Seminoles, the Panther clan (to which Billie belonged) was headed by medicine men. Billie Motlow trained Josie Billie to become a medicine man, and through years of training, Josie Billie progressed to hold an advanced degree, called yobi-habi. When Billie Motlow died in 1937, his medicine bundle passed to Josie Billie.

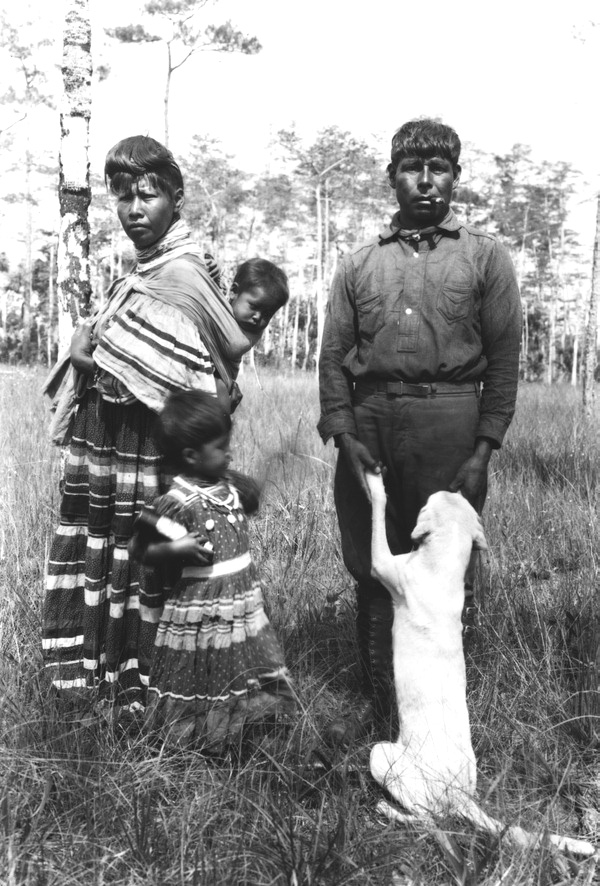
Billie with family in Big Cypress Swamp near Deep Lake, 1921

Billie advanced to become a prominent medicine man among the Mikasuki-speaking Seminoles and beyond. Billie was one of the four most prominent medicine men of the southern Florida Seminoles at the time. The other three were Ingraham Billie (Josie Billie's brother), Frank Charlie, and John Osceola of Miami. Billie bore the title of aiyik imi-fosi or medicine grandfather. Billie also provided care for those outside of the Big Cypress Reservation, including at the Dania Reservation. Josie Billie also referred those with severe illnesses to "Dr. Pender of the Everglades City," as noted in Greenlee's article "Medicine and curing practices of the modern Florida Seminoles" published in the American Anthropologist.

== Political involvement ==
Josie Billie was an advocate for the Seminole people. In 1941, the United States government provided the Big Cypress Reservation with 150 head of cattle. Because of his role as a prominent medicine man, Josie Billie acted as the spokesman for the Big Cypress Reservation in 1944 when the Seminole wanted separated cattle trustees. As a result of Billie's leadership at the March 18, 1944 meeting, a new agreement was created and approved by the Commissioner of Indian Affairs in 1945.

== Collaboration with American anthropologists ==
Josie Billie actively collaborated with American anthropologists on research related to Seminole culture, following his father's work and his role as medicine man. In 1880, Reverend Clay MacCauley visited the Seminoles residing on the Big Cypress swamp in the Everglades. MacCauley obtained information about Seminole mythology from Billie's father, which he used for comparative research about Seminole acculturation. Billie continued in this tradition by providing information to anthropologists about Seminole folklore and mythology. As a medicine man, Billie was the spokesman for the Panther clan of Mikasuki-speaking Seminoles to outside researchers. Because of his history of working with researchers, anthropologist Robert Greenlee identified Josie Billie as an intermediary between the Seminole and researchers.

Billie served as an informant on Seminole culture for many prominent American anthropologists, including Ethel Cutler Freeman, Frances Densmore, Robert Greenlee, Robert Solenberg (on behalf of anthropologist Frank G. Speck) and William Sturtevant. Josie Billie first worked with Frances Densmore, an ethnomusicologist from the Bureau of American Ethnology, to study Muskogee- and Mikasuki-speaking groups. Densmore first visited the Seminole living on the Big Cypress Swamp in January 1931. Billie collaborated with Densmore at the Musa Isle Trading post in 1931 and 1932, recording 63 folk songs. These recordings could not be completed after objections from Seminole community members about sharing traditional folksongs. Billie played a key role as an informant for her research, and his picture appears on the first page of Densmore's research report, Seminole Music (1956).

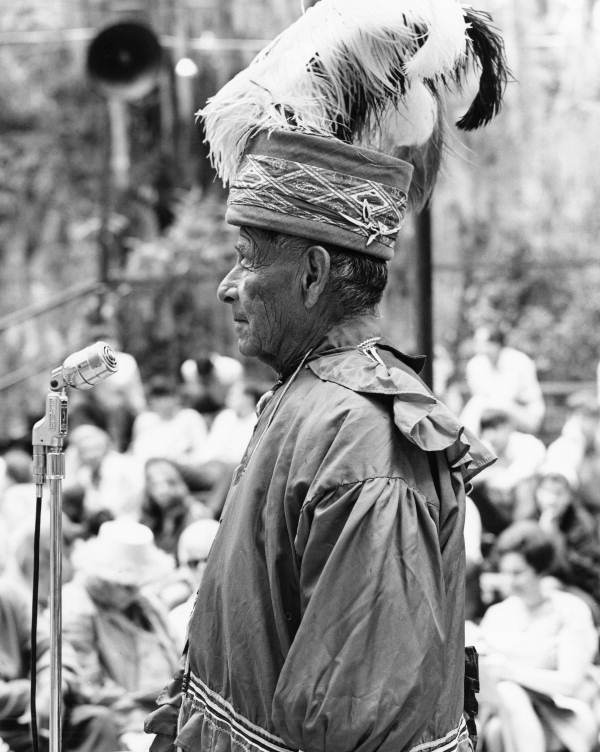
Josie Billie speaking at the Florida Folk Festival in White Springs, c. 1970

During the late 1930s and 1940s, Billie worked with Greenlee, Freeman, and Solenberg. Billie worked as an informant for Robert Greenlee, providing interpretations of different ceremonies, including the Green Corn Dance and traditional medicine and folktales. In 1939, Josie Billie conveyed Seminole origin stories to Greenlee, including ones related to the origin on the koonti, a root believed to be a gift from God. Rev. MacCauley had learned earlier from Billie's father that it was believed that Jesus Christ descended at Cape Florida and gave the koonti root to the Seminole. Billie's own story about the koonti stated that it was a gift from the Breathmaker, fisaki omici, whom Billie equates with Jesus. Billie also told Greenlee Miccosukee traditions from his childhood and shared mythology related to cosmology and meteorology.

Billie also worked with Ethel Cutler Freeman, an amateur Seminole specialist from the American Museum of Natural History. Freeman first visited the Big Cypress Reservation on behalf of the American Museum of Natural History and began a longer period of fieldwork with the Seminoles in winter of 1940. Freeman continued to conduct fieldwork almost every winter between 1940 and 1943 among the Seminole people. Freeman studied Seminole religion and myths and recorded discussions with Josie Billie related to Seminole religion and magic in private sessions at the Archbold Biological Station in 1954. During these discussions, Billie relayed esoteric chants and medicinal practices from his work as a medicine man.

Josie Billie's name appears in the field notes and recordings of Robert Solenberger and William Sturtevant. Robert Solenberger recorded field notes for anthropologist Frank G. Speck in December 1940, including conversations with Josie Billie related to Seminole language, myth, and customs. Later in 1950 and 1951, American ethnologist William Sturtevant began conducting fieldwork among the Miccosukee, and in 1952 began conducting fieldwork on the Big Cypress Reservation. Sturtevant met Josie Billie in the summer of 1950 and wrote his doctoral dissertation about Billie, who informed much of his research. Sturtevant noted that Billie was older than two of his other informants, Joseph Jumper and Chester Billie, and much more knowledgeable about Seminole tradition.

Like Densmore and Freeman, Sturtevant also recorded Seminole folk songs in 1951, including “Scalping Sickness,” “Bear Sickness with blowing,” “Bear sickness without blowing,” “Lullaby,” “Father Dance,” “Snake Dance,” and “Crazy Dance.” Josie Billie was one of the performers for these recordings. Also, like Freeman, Sturtevant studied changes in myths over time related to acculturation and contact with surrounding white settlements, stating that “Josie Billie is older, much more knowledgeable on Seminole tradition, and in most senses less ‘acculturated’ than my other two informants." Josie Billie therefore appeared in many ethnographic recordings of traditional Seminole myths and folk songs.

Beyond his work with American anthropologists, Josie Billie also participated in the Florida Folk Festival, which was founded in 1953 and still exists today. Josie Billie also performed folk songs that were recorded by Foster Bares at the Florida Folk Festivals, including the 1959 Florida Folk Festival in White Springs. Billie's role as an informant for these American anthropologists and participant in this festival facilitated access to traditional Seminole folk songs, myths, and medical knowledge.

== Religious practice ==
Josie Billie and 21 other Seminole were baptized into the Southern Baptist Church at the Big Cypress schoolhouse on January 21, 1945. After Josie Billie converted to Christianity, he became a Baptist minister in 1945 and attended the Florida Baptist Institute in 1946. After his conversion to Christianity and ordination, his medicine bundle passed to his brother Ingraham Billie. However, there is still controversy around the passing of the medicine bundle, as Billie continued to practice traditional Seminole medicine after converting to Christianity. Billie's conversion reflects growing numbers of Christian converts among the Seminole tribe. Many Mikasuki-speaking Seminole, who had originally settled the Big Cypress Reservation in 1937, later converted to Christianity. Leadership of the annual Green Corn Dance passed to Ingraham Billie, keeper of the medicine bundle and Billie's brother.

While the medicine man was a key spiritual and political role in the Seminole tribe, the influence of medicine men declined as representatives of Christian denominations, most notably Baptists, became active among the Seminole. Among the two establishments that Billie helped to create related to cattle trustees, persons who had converted to Christianity were often selected for higher trustee positions. In the 1940s, about one third of the Florida Seminole population had become Southern Baptists, as a result of contact with Baptists ministers like Stanley Smith.

Stanley Smith was an Oklahoma Creek Baptist minister who facilitated the conversion of many Seminole to Christianity at Big Cypress, where Josie Billie lived. Originally sent by the Creek, Seminole, Witchita Baptist Association, his appointment with the Seminole tribe was confirmed by the Home Mission Board of the Southern Baptist Convention in January 1944. After he arrived on the Big Cypress Reservation in 1943, Smith was involved in Josie Billie's conversion to Christianity. By the early 1950s, Baptists churches had been established on three of the four major reservations, and Bill Osceola ministered to the Big Cypress reservation. Baptist, English-speaking cattle owners dominated the political hierarchy of the Seminole Tribe of Florida from its formation in 1957 through the 1970s.

== Later life ==
By the 1970s, the Native American population in Florida was roughly 2,000. The Seminole continued to live in southern Florida on four main reservations: Hollywood, Big Cypress, Brighton, and the Tamiami Trail. Josie Billie remained active at the Big Cypress Indian Reservation until his death on February 26, 1980, at the age of 92.

The Seminole Tribe of Florida Tribal Historic Preservation Office completed an investigation of the Josie Billie Camp in 2017, and it is now listed on the Tribal Register of Historic Places. The Josie Billie Camp is in the northern part of the Big Cypress Indian Reservation, where it was believed to have been established by Josie Billie and Lucy Tiger in 1943.

Recordings of Josie Billie's discussions on Seminole culture and religion are part of the Ethel Cutler Freeman Papers and the William C. Sturtevant Papers at the National Anthropological Archives.
