= James E. Billie =

Seminole tribal leader

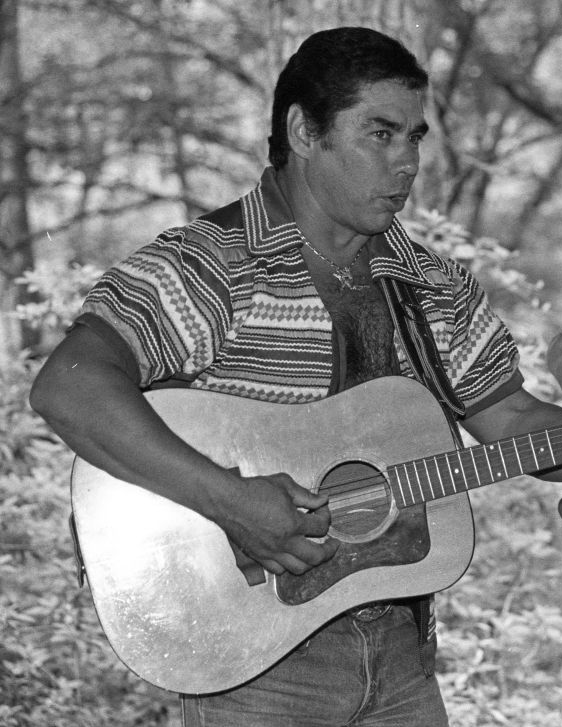
- Billie in 1983

4th and 6th Tribal Council Chairman of the Seminole Tribe of Florida
- In office 2011–2016
- Preceded by: Mitchell Cypress
- Succeeded by: Marcellus Osceola Jr.
- In office 1979–2001
- Preceded by: Howard Tommie
- Succeeded by: Mitchell Cypress

Personal details
- Born: March 20, 1944 (age 82) Dania, Florida
- James E. Billie's voice Billie addressing the crowd at the 1995 Florida Folk Festival; Recorded May 26, 1995

James Edward Billie (born March 20, 1944), known as Chief Jim Billie, is a politician who chaired the Seminole Tribe of Florida from 1979 to 2001, and again from 2011 to 2016.

Billie's first tenure was the longest "of any elected leader in the Western Hemisphere, other than Fidel Castro," at 22 years. In 2001, he was impeached due to allegations of sexual misconduct. The source of the allegations later recanted and Billie won $600,000 in a lawsuit for wrongful impeachment. In 2011, he was re-elected to his former office, earning nearly 60% of the vote.

In 2005 Sarasota Magazine called Chief Billie “the most powerful American Indian leader of the past century.” He is best known for leading the tribe's success in the landmark Seminole Tribe of Florida v. Florida decision in 1996, upholding state and tribal sovereignty. In 2019 he was honored as a Florida Folk Heritage Award recipient.

== Early life and education ==
Jim Billie was born in poverty at a camp in Dania, Florida near the Tamiami Trail. His mother Agnes Billie was Seminole of the Bird clan; his father was J.W. Barnett, a white sailor who went to Europe during World War II, never knowing that Agnes was pregnant. She named the boy Whookipee, meaning "He who has been taken away". Shortly after Billie's birth, Seminole medicine men intended to kill the infant by leaving him to die in the Everglades; they intended to do so because he was a "half-breed" and they strongly discouraged intermarriage with whites. His mother Agnes and Betty Mae Tiger, a young Snake clan woman, intervened and saved his life by threatening to report them to the reservation superintendent. (Tiger and her brother's lives had been threatened in the late 1920s when they were young, as their father was white.

Despite being a "half-breed", under the Seminole matrilineal system, Billie belonged to his mother's Bird clan; he grew up learning the Seminole ways. He was orphaned at the age of nine when his mother died, but the boy was cared for by several families of the Bird clan, with whom he remains very close. By the age of fourteen, he learned to catch and wrestle alligators in tourist shows to earn money for his family. He was interested in music as a young boy, and later combined many of the sounds he heard in his own melodies and lyrics.

He enlisted at age 19 in the United States Army in 1965. He served in specialized units engaged in commando operations in the Vietnam War.

== Career ==
After his return to Florida, Billie worked in different jobs on the reservation. He was worried about the young people who seemed so discouraged, and started studying more about his heritage, and speaking about the Seminole ways. He built a highly successful business building chickees, mostly for whites who wanted an authentic Seminole tradition. He also became manager of the Seminole Indian Village on the Hollywood reservation.

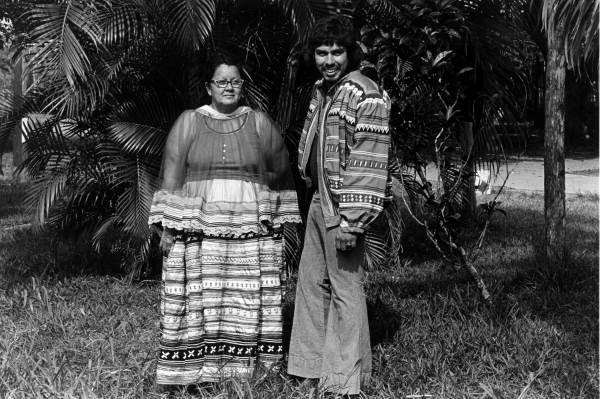
Betty Mae Tiger Jumper and Billie in 1973

He became involved in tribal politics. He first was elected to the General Council.

Elected Chairman of the tribe in 1979, Billie led the tribe through legal challenges to the high-stakes bingo game first proposed by the previous chairman, Howard Tommie. Surviving state challenges, the Tribe established its first site, asserting its right as a sovereign nation to have gambling, at a time when gambling was widely illegal, although some states were beginning to adopt lotteries to raise money. The establishment of gaming operations was an economic engine for the Seminole, and many other tribes followed its example.

States struggled to regulate gambling even after the 1988 passage of the Indian Gaming Regulatory Act (IGRA), which established federal rules to regulate it. In 1996 the Seminole Tribe won the US Supreme Court case, Seminole Tribe of Florida v. Florida, in which the Court affirmed the tribe's sovereign rights against regulation by the state outside the IGRA.

During Florida’s “cocaine cowboy” days, Billie used his military training to organize a Seminole self-defense force to patrol the Florida Everglades. They hunted down cocaine pilots who used isolated roads in the Seminole Tribe lands as improvised airstrips. That force became the basis for the Seminole Tribe’s police force, which Billie founded.

As revenues to the tribe increased, it constructed a five-story administration building during his tenure. Pleased with the tribe's success during Billie's tenure, the Council raised his annual salary to $330,000. He was the highest-paid elected official in Florida.

Billie was impeached by the Seminole Council in 2001 for what they claimed were financial irregularities stemming from sexual misconduct. The St. Petersburg Times ran a series of articles attacking him, and the FBI investigated him for years. The tribe's court case "fizzled" after he was expelled from the ruling council in 2003 and banned from using the tribe's airplanes, housed at a hangar at Big Cypress Indian Reservation. He sued the Council and that year was awarded $600,000 in damages by the Seminole Tribe.

By 2005, a tribal audit showed the Seminole Tribe had taken in $1.1 billion in revenues that year. In 2007, the tribe purchased the Hard Rock Cafe franchise, a worldwide consortium of restaurants, hotels and casinos. In 2011, the Sun Sentinel estimated total revenues taken in by the tribe to be in the billions of dollars and growing.

In 2011, Billie defeated Mitchell Cypress, the previous two-term chairman, by winning 58.4 percent of the votes for the Chair of the Seminole Tribe. He was ousted as chairman by the Seminole Tribe of Florida in September 2016.

=== Business ===
To make a living after leaving the chairmanship, Billie returned to his Jim Billie Seminole Indian Chiki Huts business, building the traditional chickee open houses. He had made this his first business before entering tribal politics.

In 2005, Billie was hired as CEO of the Micco Aircraft Company, based in Oklahoma. They are manufacturers of a line of recreational aircraft.

== Marriage and family ==
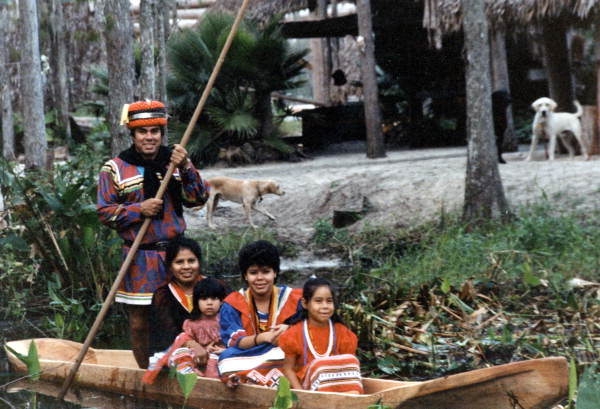
Billie with his family in 1985

Billie has eight children. The first three were from a marriage with Bobbie, a Panther clan member. The next three from his second spouse, to whom he is estranged. He currently lives near the shores of Lake Okeechobee on reservation lands with his longtime wife, Maria and their two children Eecho and AUBEE. Both Eecho, and AUBEE, Broadway Star, attribute their success to their parents, James E Billie and Maria Billie.

In addition to politics and business, Billie became a musician and songwriter. His band The Shack Daddies plays what he dubs "swamp-rock," a style of folk rock. In 1999, he was nominated for a Grammy for his song “Big Alligator” on his album, Alligator Tears. That same year, Billie helped the Vermont jam band Phish arrange their two-day New Year's Eve festival at the Big Cypress reservation, which brought 80,000 of the group's fans to a pasture on Seminole land. Billie performed two of his songs with the group during their Dec 30 performance.

In February 2012, Billie suffered a stroke, causing him to temporarily vacate his office.

== Awards ==
- 1999: Nominated for a Grammy for his song “Big Alligator.”
- 1999: Outstanding Music Achievement award. First American in Arts Council
- 1999: Living Legend by the Native American Music Awards
