= Seminole Tribe of Florida =

Native reservation

Ēkvn-yoksvlke (Creek)

Total population
- 4,244 enrolled citizens (in 2019)

Regions with significant populations
- United States (Florida)

Languages
- English, Spanish, Mikasuki, Mvskoke

Religion
- Indigenous religion, Christianity

Related ethnic groups
- Seminole Nation of Oklahoma, Miccosukee, Muscogee people

The Seminole Tribe of Florida (Creek: Ēkvn-yoksvlke) is a federally recognized Seminole tribe based in the U.S. state of Florida. Together with the Seminole Nation of Oklahoma and the Miccosukee Tribe of Indians of Florida, it is one of three federally recognized Seminole entities. It received that status in 1957. Today, it has six Indian reservations in Florida.

The Florida Seminole, along with the Miccosukee, speak the Mikasuki language, also spelled Miccosukee. The language has been referred to as a descendant of Hitchiti, (Note: Pronounced /ˈhɪʧəˌti/.) a dialect of Hitchiti, and another term for Hitchiti. Additionally, some Florida Seminole communities speak a dialect of the Mvskoke language called Florida Seminole Creek.

In 1975, the Tribe established tax-free smoke shops and a high-stakes bingo operation that became one of the first tribal gaming endeavors in the United States. These ventures, particularly the gaming operation, have generated significant revenues for education, welfare and economic development. A 2005 tribal audit said it took in $1.1 billion in revenues that year. The Seminole Tribe is also known widely for owning the Hard Rock Cafe as well as nearly all Hard Rock-branded properties including casinos, hotels, and resorts since 2006. The tribe requires members to have at least one-quarter Seminole blood quantum. As of 2016, the estimated wealth of the tribe is near US$12 billion.

== History ==
The Seminole emerged in a process of ethnogenesis from various Native American groups who settled in Florida in the 18th century, primarily Muscogee from what is now northern Florida, Georgia and Alabama. They distanced themselves increasingly from other Muscogee groups, and expanded and prospered owing to their thriving trade network during Florida's British and second Spanish periods (c. 1767–1821). These settlers joined with the survivors of Florida's original Native American communities (Tequesta, etc.) in the interior of south Florida. While some scholars have thought that the Calusa were also integrated into the Seminole tribes, there is no documentation to support that theory.

During this period, the largely autonomous Native American villages developed alliances with African-American maroons, mostly self-emancipated former slaves from the South's Low Country and some free Black people from the Spanish period of rule. These people became known as Black Seminoles, establishing towns near Native American settlements.

During the Seminole Wars against the United States in the 19th century, particularly after the second war, most Seminole and Black Seminole were forced by the US to relocate west of the Mississippi River to Indian Territory. A smaller group – possibly fewer than 500 – refused to leave Florida and moved deep into the Everglades, where they avoided settlers and thrived in pseudo-isolation. They fostered a culture of staunch independence. The modern Florida Seminole, about 17,233 at the 2010 census, Miccosukee and Traditionals descend from these survivors.

The Florida Seminole re-established limited relations with the United States and Florida governments in the late 19th century, and by the early 20th century were concentrated in five camps in the Everglades. The portion who spoke more Muskogee consolidated in the northern part of the Everglades near the Cow Creek Camp, becoming known as the Cow Creek Seminole. The Miccosukee, who spoke the Mikasuki language, were located to the south, in an area cut through by completion of the Tamiami Trail in 1928.

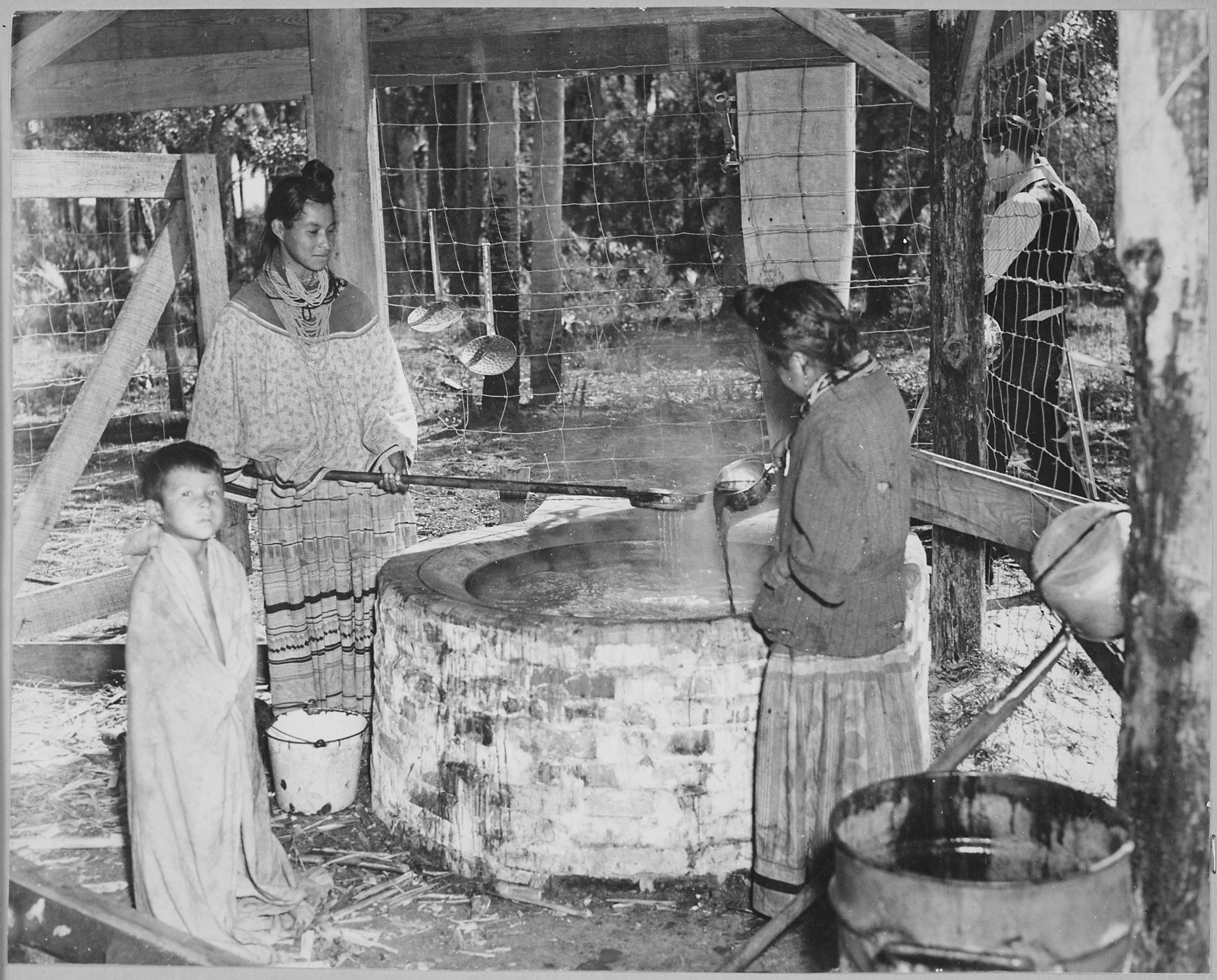
Seminoles cooking sugarcane syrup, 1941

The Cow Creek Seminole eventually received 5,000 acres (20 km^{2}) of reservation land in the 1930s, beginning with Brighton Reservation. At first, few Seminoles had any interest in relocating to reservations, preferring their traditional lifestyle to a more sedentary reservation life. Following the efforts of Creek Christian missionaries, more Seminole moved to reservations in the 1940s to form their own churches. Other factors in the move include Florida's drainage of the wetlands and shift toward wide-scale agriculture. This contributed to the depletion of game and other resources by the state's expanding population, reducing the tribal people's ability to live in traditional ways.

== Tribal reorganization ==
From 1920 to 1940, many changes took place in Seminole land and environment. Settlers and developers wanting to convert wetlands to farms and residential communities had built drainage projects, which altered the wetlands ecosystem and damaged many species that it supported. As early as 1916, Royal Palm State Park, which would be incorporated into the Everglades National Park in 1947, was set aside as a conservation area. Construction of the Tamiami Trail across the center of the Everglades, the Civilian Conservation Corps projects from 1933 to 1934, and the eventual opening of the National Park, all served to displace many Seminole families who had lived throughout the area.

In the 1930s, the US government established a reservation at Brighton and tried to recruit Seminole to resettle there. The government fenced in the reservation and introduced cattle, which had been part of Seminole culture for three centuries. The first government shipment of cattle arrived from Arizona in 1934 and, by the late 1930s, the cattle business was a way of life for many Seminole. In 1936, the US government supplied cattle to the Florida Seminoles with an understanding that the tribes would repay for the livestock in the coming years.

=== Cattle trustees ===
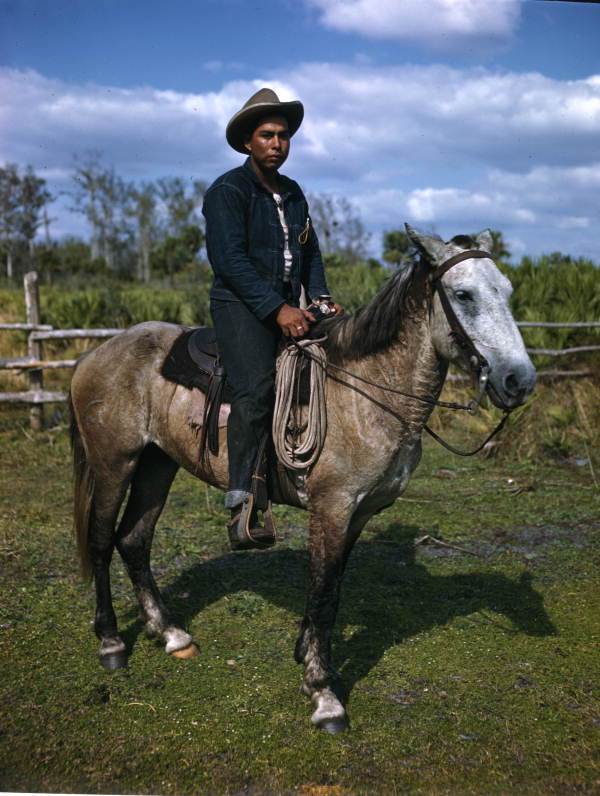
Seminole cattleman, Brighton Reservation, Florida, 1949

With the introduction of cattle to Brighton, the Seminoles were introduced to democratic ideas and tribal organization. The trust agreement established by the Commissioner of Indian Affairs, on September 12, 1939, required that the tribe elect three trustees to transact the business of the cattle program. The first "election" was largely guided by the Florida Agricultural Extension Agent, Fred Montsdeoca, and a local missionary. They promoted men who knew English and were good at White-Native cooperation, as opposed to allowing the tribe to select those most skilled in animal husbandry. Montsdeoca was extremely influential in making decisions regarding the cattle program and, next to the Indian Affairs official at the reservation, was the most important local White man for the Seminole.

Given their success at Brighton, in 1941, the Seminole acquired 150 head of cattle from Florida for the Big Cypress Reservation. By 1944, the Big Cypress Seminole wanted their own trustees and drafted an agreement with the government. Approved by the BIA commissioner on August 8, 1945, this agreement called for the establishment of the Brighton Agricultural and Livestock Enterprise and the Big Cypress Agricultural and Livestock Enterprise, each with their own three trustee cattle managers. The tribal trustees would be appointed, with each of the cattle trustee groups and the BIA agent appointing a tribal trustee. The three appointees on each reservation would also serve as tribal representatives. In essence, this requirement ensured that those adept at navigating between the Native American and non-Native worlds would gain the positions. According to Covington, men who were adept at developing consensus decisions and had converted to Christianity were most likely to be selected.

Although such tribal organization was relatively weak, the tribe used it as a basis for their team to file a land claim with the Indian Claims Commission, seeking compensation for lands taken by the federal government.

=== Land claims ===
In October 1948, the two livestock associations met with the Bureau of Indian Affairs superintendent to discuss pursuing a land claim against the U.S. Government through the newly formed Indian Claims Commission. They contacted Jacksonville attorney Roger J. Waybright, who initially was reluctant to take the case because the tribe had limited funding and the government dictated the amounts the attorneys could charge. Waybright was soon persuaded of the merits of the case and agreed to represent the tribe, signing a contract with his partner John O. Jackson on October 15, 1949. The 12 representatives who made the claim were the six trustees for the livestock associations and the 6 tribal representatives: Josie Billie, Jimmy Cypress, John Cypress, Junior Cypress, John Henry Gopher, Little Charlie Micco, Bill Osceola, Frank Shore, Jack Smith, Morgan Smith, Ben Tommie, and Sammy Tommie.

The claim was filed August 14, 1950, and represented land taken under the Treaty of Moultrie Creek in 1823, land taken under the Treaty of Payne's Landing in 1832, land taken in the Macomb Treaty of 1839, and land taken in 1944 for the Everglades National Park —– in all totaling nearly $48,000,000. In July 1951 the Seminole Nation of Oklahoma had also filed a petition before the Indian Claims Commission for claims involving their removal to Oklahoma and substantially the same land takings under Moultrie and Payne's Landing as the Florida Seminoles. Because of the overlapping of claims, the commission split the Florida claim into two cases, one sharing the Oklahoma claims in the treaties and the other, dealing with Florida's sole claim to land taken for the Everglades National Park.

Government delays; tribal reorganization, which caused Waybright to resign from the case; resignation of the female replacement for Waybright, Effie Knowles, who felt the tribe would be happier with male representation; the hiring of Roy Struble of Miami and Charles Bragman of Washington, DC; and the death of attorney John Jackson all contributed to the claim dragging into the 1960s. Then in 1962, the Miccosukee Tribe of Indians of Florida organized their tribe and gained federal recognition. They sought to intervene in the case in 1968, but were not allowed. Finally on May 13, 1970, the Claims Commission awarded $12,262,780, which was promptly appealed by both the Oklahoma and Florida Seminoles. In 1975, in a compromise settlement to prevent further delays, the two groups agreed to $16,000,000 as a final settlement, but were required to have general meetings with their tribes to confirm the amount.

In January 1976, the Florida Seminole were presented with the terms of settlement; it was translated into both the Mikasuki language and Muscogee language. Only seven tribemembers opposed accepting the agreement. In March 1976, the unorganized Traditionals in Florida filed an injunction to stop the award. On March 11, 1977, the Traditionals' complaint was dismissed. On April 20, 1977, the Macomb claim was disallowed, but an additional $50,000 was awarded for land in the Everglades. With those final decisions the awards were completed, but it took another fourteen years before the funds were distributed. The Claims Commission gave no direction as to how the judgment was to be split between the tribes of Oklahoma and Florida Seminoles, the Miccosukee and Traditionals.

The groups had to negotiate as to how the settlement would be apportioned, leading to the most contact among them in a century. During this period, the money was put in trust and earning interest. In 1990, the groups finally agreed to the Seminole Nation of Oklahoma receiving three-quarters of the settlement, based on early population records from 1906 to 1914, when members had blood quantum; and the Florida Seminole in total to receive one-quarter, based on reconstructed early 20th-century censuses. At the time of the settlement, the two Florida tribes and Traditionals had a higher percentage of full-bloods due to their endogamous marriage practices. They also had blood quantum requirements for tribal membership. By 1990, the total value of the trust had reached $46 million.

=== Threats of termination ===
In 1953, the Seminole were informed they were on the congressional list for termination of their tribal status and federal benefits, under the federal Indian termination policy to reduce costs and the determination that some tribes no longer needed any special relationship with the federal government. But termination would result in their eviction from the three existing reservations. Few of the Seminole at the time had gained formal education or graduated from high school, and they worried about being able to organize as a tribe in order to deal with the government.

The federal government persisted in classifying all the 918 Native Americans in the Florida agency area as Seminole, although the 305 Miccosukee and Traditionals closer to the Tamiami Trail did not identify with the reservation Seminole. They had asserted their independence from the reservation group since the 1920s. The Seminole appealed to have federal supervision continued so they could better prepare to manage their affairs.

The superintendent of the Seminole Agency in Florida asked tribal leaders to elect representatives from the reservations to have people at hearings: Dania (now Hollywood) was represented by Sam Tommie and Laura Mae Osceola; Brighton by Billy Osceola and Toby Johns; Big Cypress by Josie Billie and Jimmie Cypress; and the Trail people by Henry Cypress and Curtis Osceola, as the founding representatives. Mvskoke and Mikasuki language interpreters were appointed. Although the Traditionals or Trail people wanted to continue with their Tribal Council, the Seminole continued to develop an alternative form of government.

They went to Washington to testify to Congress, and solicited help from the women's groups who had formed to help the Seminole, such as The Friends of the Seminoles Florida Foundation, Inc., the Seminole Indian Association, Indian Welfare, and the Florida Federation of Women's Clubs. After that their officers also testified for the Seminole. The women had developed organizations to aid the Seminole; for instance, they helped support children to go to boarding schools, lobbied to get Seminole admitted to local public schools, which were racially segregated and classified the Seminole as among "colored" to attend with African Americans; and loaned money to men trying to buy homes.

The Seminole consulted with other tribes and experts to help them develop their government structure. They wrote a constitution and corporate charter, modeled on the Indian Reorganization Act of 1934. The vote was opened in 1957 to the 448 reservation Seminole and any Trail Indians who wanted to participate; the Seminole approved the constitution and corporate charter on August 21, 1957. The Seminole Tribe of Florida received federal recognition later that year.

This process had heightened the differences among the groups. The Trail peoples, who were Mikasuki-language speakers, formed their own government, receiving state recognition in 1957 and federal recognition as the Miccosukee Tribe of Indians of Florida in 1962. Some Traditionals refused to affiliate with either tribe, as they wanted to avoid relations with the federal government. The Miccosukee had reservation land taken into trust for them by the federal government. In addition, the two tribes made a long-term lease arrangement in 1983 with the state of Florida for access and use of nearly 200,000 acres of wetlands. This access greatly expanded their ability to maintain traditional fishing and hunting practices.

== Governance and leadership ==
The Seminole Tribe of Florida is led by an elected tribal council with representatives from each of its reservations. It elects a chairman and vice-chairman as leaders. The tribal headquarters are located in Hollywood, Florida.

=== Notable leaders ===
In 1975 Howard Tommie was re-elected as chairman to a second term by a wide margin. He led the Tribe through 1979 in a number of important initiatives that created a new direction for the people, with the assertion of sovereignty, significant revenue generation, and accelerated economic development. He urged acceptance of the US land claims settlement in 1976; the Florida and Oklahoma Seminole negotiated for more than a decade before reaching their final agreement in 1990 as to distribution of trust funds. He initiated negotiations with the state of Florida over water rights at the Seminole reservations, winning legal standing and protecting their resources.

Jim Billie, who was re-elected in 2011 with 58.4% of the council vote, after previously serving from 1979 to 2001, led the tribe through a dramatic expansion of operations, with development of new programs and facilities as it invested the revenues generated from gaming and related entertainment.

== Economic development ==
Learning from operations on the Colville reservation in Washington state, Chairman Tommie directed the establishment of a tax-free cigarette shop on the Hollywood Reservation, where the tribe started to generate more substantial income. Next, they pursued a high-stakes bingo operation on their reservation, which also started to generate substantial revenues.

=== Bingo, casino gaming, hotels ===
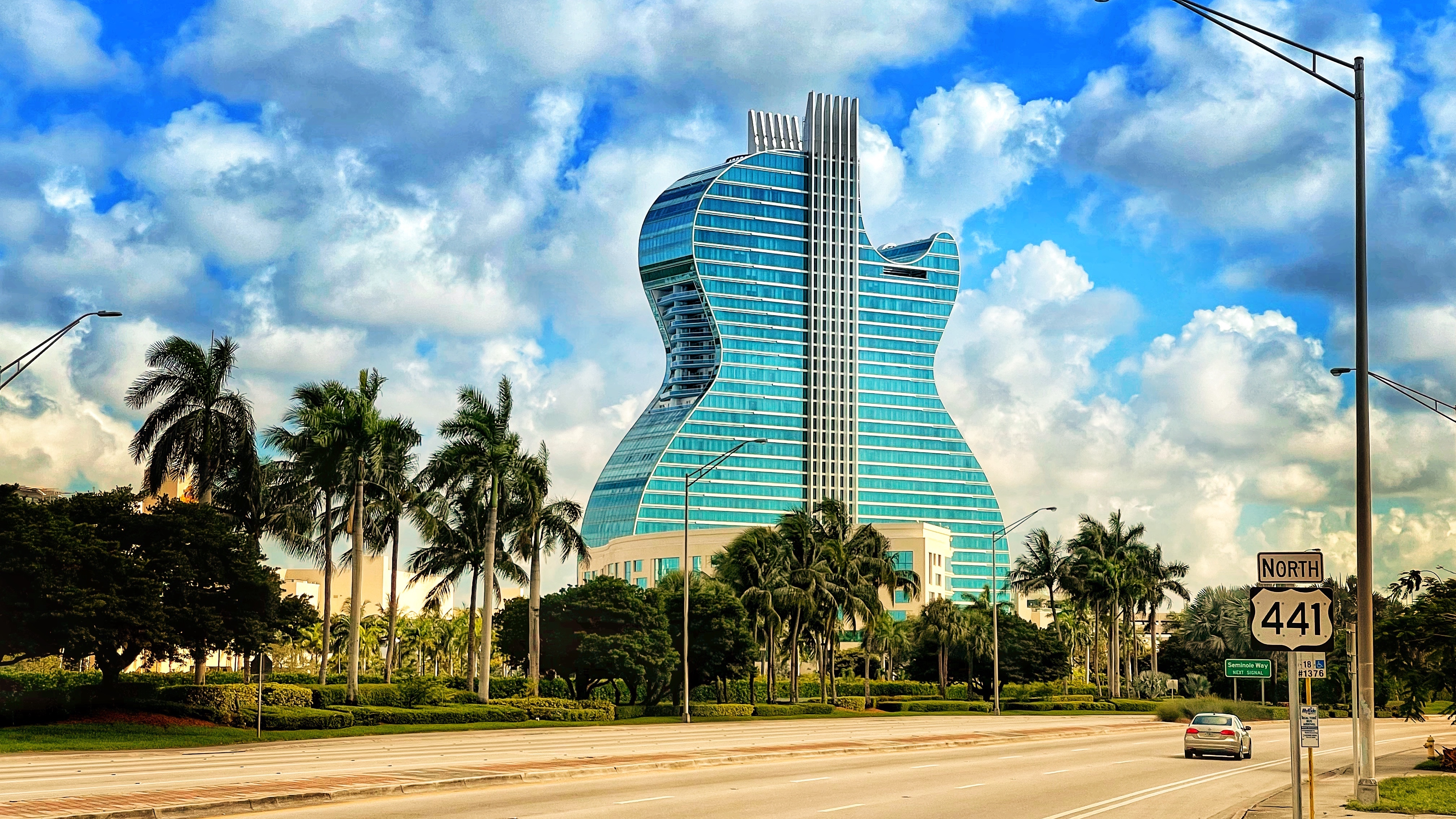
The Seminole Hard Rock Hotel & Casino Hollywood

Jim Billie furthered the tribe's 1979 high-stakes bingo plan. Surviving multiple court challenges, the first major Indian gaming establishment in the United States was opened in 1981 by the Seminole. Subsequent changes in federal and state laws have paved the way for dozens of other tribes to increase their revenues through development of gambling casinos, resorts, and related hotels and retail outlets. All generate revenue as well for the states in which they are located, under compacts regulated by the Indian Gaming Regulatory Act of 1988.

The Seminole tribe has six reservations. They have developed more extensive hotels and related resorts for gaming on some of their reservations. In 2007, the Tribe bought the Hard Rock Cafe franchise for $965 million, including 124 Hard Rock Cafes, four Hard Rock Hotels, two Hard Rock Hotels and Casino-Hotels, two Hard Rock Live concert venues, and stakes in three unbranded hotels. Since then, they established the Hard Rock Cafe brand in their hotels and casinos. They now have a total of six casinos.

=== Online sports wagering ===
In 2021, Florida Governor Ron DeSantis signed a deal with the tribe to operate online sports betting. However, on November 23, 2021, D.C. District Court Judge Dabney L. Friedrich held that the compact violated Federal Law, specifically the Indian Gaming Regulatory Act (IGRA). At the heart of the matter was a Seminole plan to offer sports betting state-wide using servers housed on tribal lands. The compact violated IGRA because any state-sanctioned gambling must occur on tribal lands, unless state law allows online wagering from any location in the state. Since Florida law does not permit such activity, the agreement between Governor DeSantis and the tribe was declared void.

The judge further ordered the state of Florida to reinstate the 2010 compact previously agreed to by Seminole tribe. The tribe subsequently appealed the court's ruling on November 24, 2021. On December 3, 2021, the District of Columbia appellate court denied the appeal because they failed to demonstrate any irreparable harm resulting from the loss of its state-wide sports betting operation. The Department of Justice - which failed to follow the law when it initially approved the compact - also filed its appeal in late January 2022. Online sports wagering resumed on November 7, 2023, for previous users of the Hard Rock Bet app.

=== Other industries ===
Other significant parts of their economy are based on production of the citrus groves and cattle farming on the Brighton and Big Cypress reservations, and forestry. Beginning with a small group of cattle brought from the West in the 1930s, the Seminole Tribe has developed the 12th-largest cattle operation in the country. It is located primarily on the Big Cypress and Brighton reservations. In a related development, since 2008 the Seminole Tribe has marketed its beef under the brand, Seminole Beef. They are featuring it in their Hard Rock Cafe and hotels, and intend to market it to other Native American tribes, military installations, restaurants, and grocery stores throughout the country.

Tourism, both as related to the casinos and in terms of attracting people to the reservations for hunting, fishing, and guided tours, is also a part of their economy.

=== Revenue and employment ===
According to a tribal audit, in 2005 the tribe took in $1.1 billion in revenue. They pay a dividend to tribal members on a monthly basis from a portion of the income to the tribe. In February 2012, the Tampa Bay Times reported that the Seminole Tribe employed a total of 12,000 people at its headquarters and six casino operations.

== Citizenship ==
In the early part of the 20th century, the Seminole were still mostly full-bloods and had prohibitions against members marrying outside the tribe. In a 1999 interview, Betty Mae Tiger Jumper, chairwoman of the tribe from 1967 to 1971, said that in the late 1920s, Seminole medicine men had threatened to kill her and her brother, then young children, because they were of mixed heritage with a White father. She heard that other people of mixed heritage had been killed. Her great-uncle moved her family to the Dania reservation for safety.

Similarly, former chairman Jim Billie, who also had a White father, recounted that, as an infant, he was threatened in 1944 by tribal men because he was of mixed ancestry; his mother and Betty Mae Tiger, then a young woman, saved his life.

The tribe has since become more open to intermarriage. It also permits non-tribal spouses (including White or Black) to live on the reservations, unlike in earlier times. It requires tribal citizens to have a documented blood quantum of at least one-quarter Seminole ancestry. Enrolled citizens must be directly related to an individual listed on the 1957 Tribal Roll, the Base Roll of the Seminole Tribe of Florida.

As of 2000 there were around 2,000 enrolled citizens in the tribe, with over 1,300 living on the reservations. The Tribe includes members with Black ancestry, including 50 living on Fort Pierce Reservation. Almost all slaves among the Seminole in Florida were removed to Oklahoma, where their descendants are citizens of the Seminole Nation of Oklahoma and are organized into Freedmen's Bands.

== Reservations ==
The Seminole Tribe currently has six reservations:

- Big Cypress Reservation, the largest territory, including 81.972 sq mi (212.306 km^{2})
- Brighton Reservation, 57.090 sq mi (147.862 km^{2})
- Hollywood Reservation, 497 acres (2.01 km^{2})
- Immokalee Reservation, in Immokalee, Collier County, 594.45 acres (2.4057 km^{2})
- Tampa Reservation, in Hillsborough County, 38.67 acres (0.156 km²)
- Fort Pierce Reservation, a 50 acres (0.20 km^{2}) site in St. Lucie County, taken into trust for the tribe in 1995 by the U.S. Department of Interior. The tribe has constructed a modern housing development, known as Chupco's Landing, and a community center for members.

Additionally, the tribe has purchased a 796-acre (322 ha) tract of land at the edge of the Green Swamp north of Lakeland, Florida, known as the Lakeland Trust Lands, which it intends to turn into a 151-home tribal residential development with facilities for residents' social, cultural, and educational needs. Bidding to construct the first phase of the development ended in October 2018.

Location of Big Cypress Reservation

Location of Brighton Reservation

Location of Hollywood Reservation

Location of Immokalee Reservation

Location of Tampa Reservation

Location of Fort Pierce Reservation

Location of Lakeland Trust Lands

== Language ==
Most members of the Tribe are bilingual, speaking the Mikasuki language (also spoken by the Miccosukee Tribe) and English. The language has been referred to as a descendant of Hitchiti, a dialect of Hitchiti, and another term for Hitchiti. In the 1970s, all members of the Big Cypress Reservation and most Florida Seminole spoke Mikasuki. Some Florida Seminole communities, notably those on the Brighton Reservation, speak the Florida Seminole Creek dialect of the Mvskoke language. Use of both Muskogean languages has declined among younger people.

== Culture ==
The Seminole continue to observe traditional practices such as the Green Corn Dance. They have two ceremonial grounds within the boundaries of the Big Cypress National Preserve.

In addition, they have created some new celebrations: the Big Shootout at Big Cypress, celebrated since 1997. A few years ago, they added an historical re-enactment to the annual Big Shootout, in which re-enactors take the part of Seminole, Black Seminole and US forces.

In 1956, Betty Mae Tiger Jumper (later to be elected as chairwoman of the tribe) and Alice Osceola established the first tribal newspaper, the Seminole News, which sold for 10 cents a copy. It was dropped after a while, but in 1972 the Alligator Times was established. In 1982, it was renamed the Seminole Tribune, as it continues today. Betty Mae Tiger Jumper became the editor-in-chief. As the tribal storyteller, she contributed oral history and articles about Seminole culture. In 1989, the monthly Seminole Tribune became the first Native American newspaper to win a Robert F. Kennedy Journalism Award and was nominated for a Pulitzer Prize. A member of the Native American Journalists Association, it earned five awards from that organization in 1997.

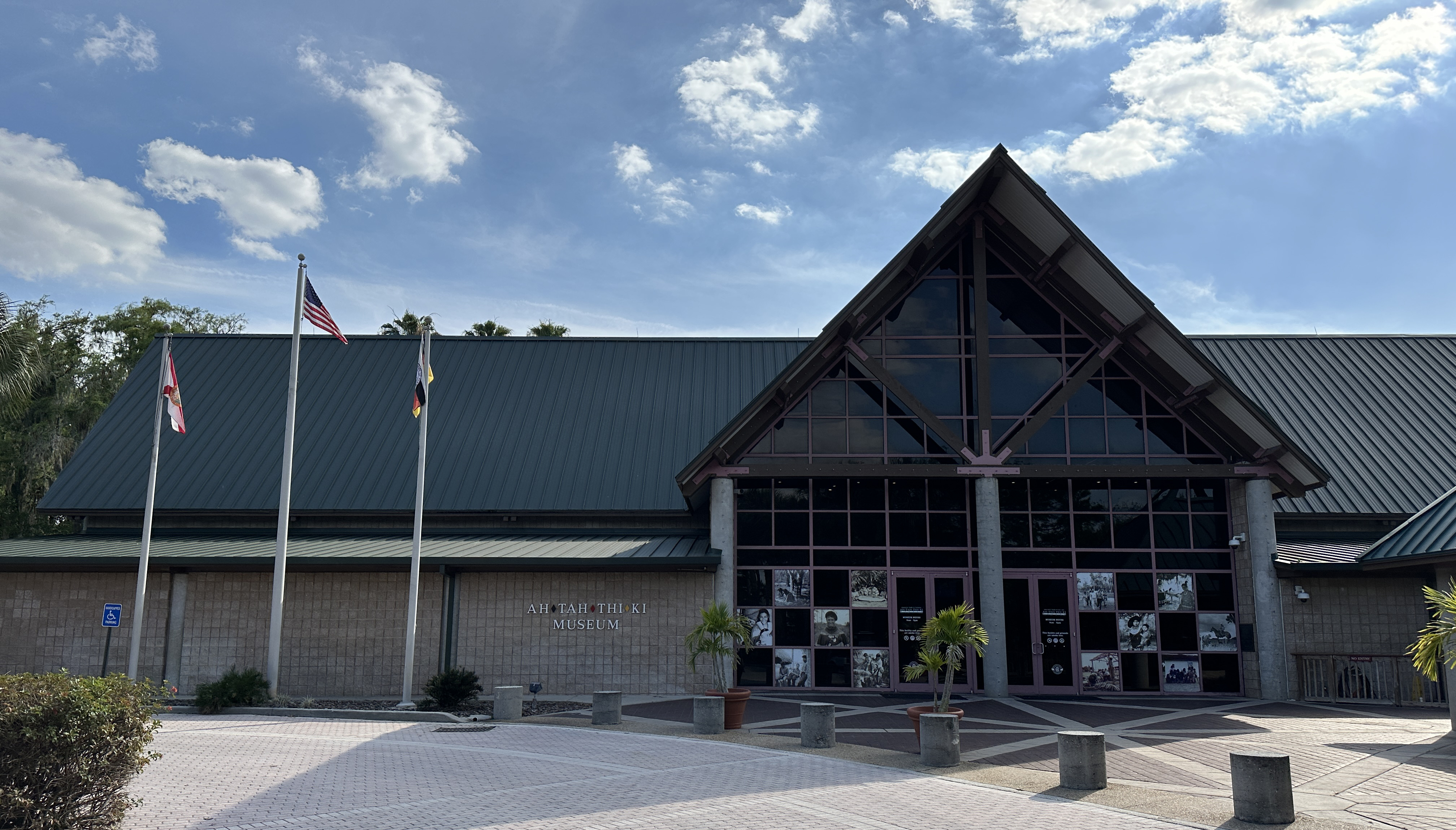
Ah-Tah-Thi-Ki Museum

=== Libraries ===
The Seminole tribal libraries include Billy Osceola Memorial Library in Brighton, Willie Frank Memorial Library in Big Cypress, Dorothy Scott Osceola Memorial Library in Hollywood, and Diane Yzaguirre Memorial Library in Immokalee. The libraries are public, and emphasize material related to the Seminole Tribe and Florida. The libraries feature more than 23,000 titles, periodicals, videos, CD ROMS, photo archives, and tapes. It also includes four decades of news articles related to the Seminole Tribe including an archive of the Seminole Tribune. The Tribal Memorabilia Collection at Ah-Tah-Thi-Ki Seminole Indian Museum is a continually growing collection of many kinds of objects that represent activities and events of the Seminole Tribe of Florida for more than 20 years. The libraries are visited yearly by more than 20,000 people and feature summer programs. Tribal and nontribal individuals use the library as a research center.

The idea of a tribal library originated in the 1940s at the Brighton Day School by William Boehmer and his wife with a book collection at the school. This system was improved on in 1985 with the help of Director of Education Winnifred Tiger and her assistant Patricia Jagiel. A professional librarian by the name of Norman H. Tribbet was hired along with additional staff. The Libraries' collections were updated along with their furnishings. Recently, the library has made efforts to modernize by updating and automating its systems. Their card catalogues have been automated and an Electric Library has been established where patrons can view thousands of books, magazines, and radio and television transcripts. The Dorothy Scott Osceola Memorial Library located at the Hollywood Reservation was temporarily relocated to other facilities during construction. Both this and the Billy Osceola Memorial Library were built in the late 1990s. After construction, the new building located at the Hollywood Reservation contained all Education programs. The addition at the Brighton Reservation doubled the size of the old library. All services were available at both sites during construction.

In 2021, the libraries received a grant from the Institute of Museum and Library Services in collaboration with the Ah-Tah-Thi-Ki Seminole Indian Museum to decolonize historic narratives and make a historic newspaper collection more accessible to the museum's community.

== Florida State University ==
Florida State University in Tallahassee uses the Seminole name and imagery for its athletics programs, the Florida State Seminoles. The name was adopted in 1947 after a fan vote; reportedly the new college football team preferred it so much that they stuffed the ballot box in its favor. Since 1978, a student portraying Osceola has been the official symbol at football games.

In the 1980s and 1990s, when mascots based on Native Americans were viewed as controversial, and considered by some to be racially problematic, many Native Americans and supporters protested their use. Florida State consulted with the Seminole Tribe of Florida, emphasizing that their use of the names and Osceola were not intended to be demeaning. Several representatives of the Seminole Tribe, including Chairman James E. Billie and Council Member Max Osceola, have given FSU their blessing to use Osceola and Seminole imagery. However, the matter remains controversial for other Florida Seminoles, as well as members of the Seminole Tribe of Oklahoma. In 2005, FSU was among the schools potentially facing NCAA sanctions for using "abusive and hostile " Native American mascots and names; after much deliberation, the NCAA gave FSU an exemption, citing the university's relationship with the Seminole Tribe of Florida as a major factor. Today, both FSU and the Tribe publicly praise their mutually agreeable relationship.

In 1996, Carla Gopher was the first member of the Seminole tribe to graduate from FSU.

== Tribal chairmen since reorganization ==
- 1957–1966: Billy Osceola, inaugural holder.
- 1967–1971: Betty Mae Tiger Jumper, first and only chairwoman of the tribe, editor-in-chief of the Seminole Tribune, tribal communications director, and the last matriarch of the Snake clan. Jumper spoke English, Mikasuki, and Muskogee.
- 1971–1979: Howard Tommie, political leader and two-term chairman of Seminole Tribal Council who initiated programs in the 1970s, including accepting the U.S. land claim settlement; successfully negotiated with the State of Florida for water rights for the Seminole reservations, and establishment of tax-free smoke shops and high-stakes bingo as revenue generators. Tommie speaks English, Mikasuki, and Muskogee.
- 1979–2003: Jim Billie, suspended in 2001, officially removed in 2003. Billie chaired during an expansion of Indian gaming and increase in tribal wealth and economic development.
- 2003–2011: Mitchell Cypress
- 2011–2016: Jim Billie, re-elected and again removed by Seminole Tribal Council in a unanimous vote (4–0) on account of "various issues with policies and procedures of the Chairman's office."
- 2016–present: Marcellus Osceola Jr.

== Notable Florida Seminole ==
- Abiaka, medicine chief and war chief of the Miccosukee during the Seminole Wars who successfully defied attempts by the Jackson administration to extract native tribes from the Southeastern United States to present-day Oklahoma.
- Jim Billie, longest-serving chief.
- Louise Gopher, first Seminole Tribe of Florida college graduate.
- Betty Mae Tiger Jumper, first female chief.
- Dr. Tomasina Chupco, Ed.D, youngest Seminole to receive a Doctorate.
- Cheyenne Kippenberger, first Seminole woman to be crowned Miss Indian World.
- Micanopy, principal chief from 1825, through the Second Seminole War, until his death in 1849 in Indian Territory.
- Osceola, born William Powell Jr., war chief during the Seminole Wars
- Jim Shore, first Florida Seminole to become a lawyer, now General Counsel of the Tribe, took a major role in land claims negotiations in the late 20th century
- Desoto Tiger, trapper, first Seminole murder victim whose White killer was convicted of murder, although no time was served.
- Susie Jim Billie, traditional maker of medicine and grand matriarch of the Panther clan in her region
