= Ah-Tah-Thi-Ki Seminole Indian Museum =

Seminole history museum in Hendry County, Florida

Ah-Tah-Thi-Ki
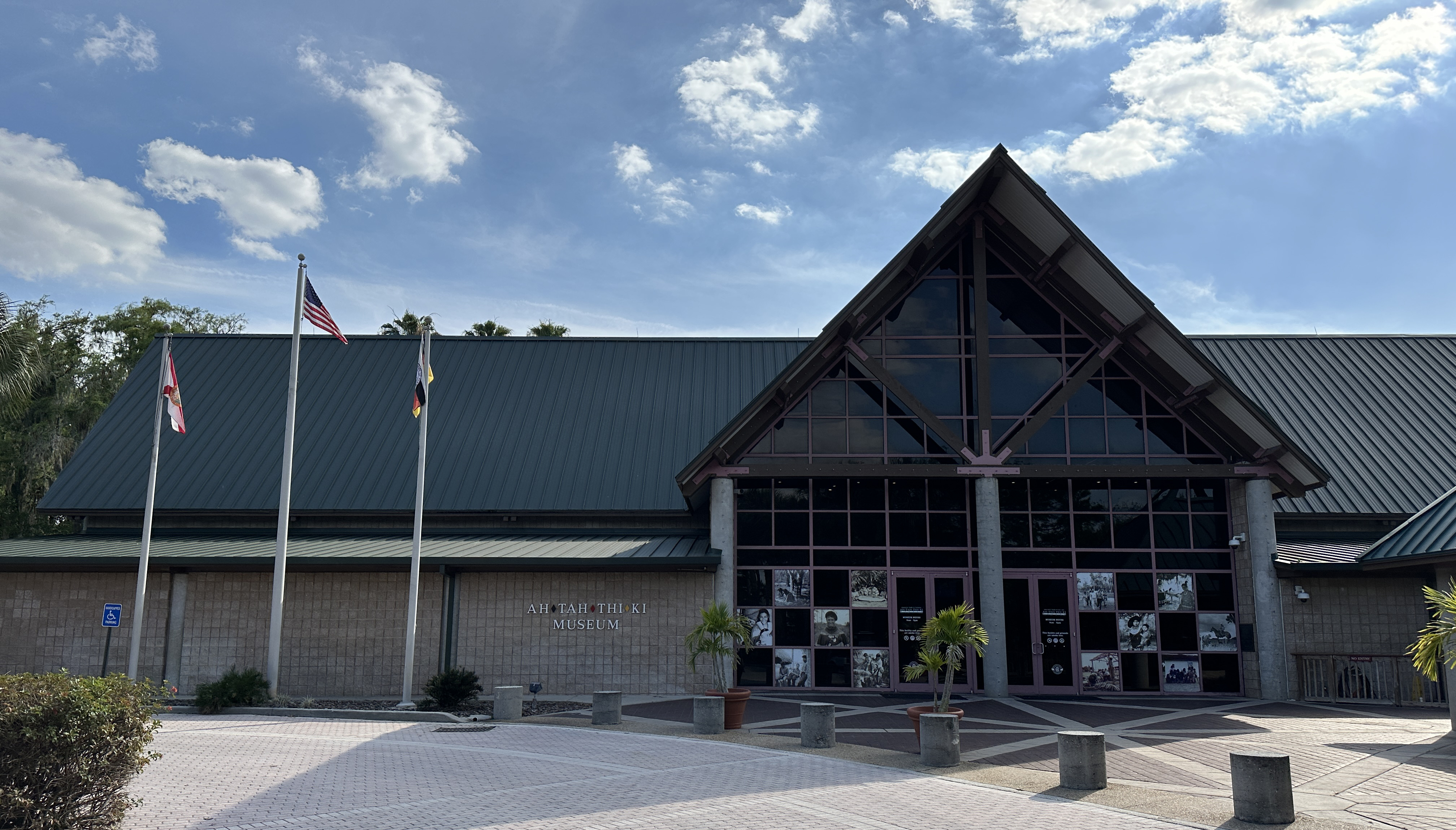
- Ah-Tah-Thi-Ki Museum
- Established: 1997
- Location: 34725 West Boundary Road; Big Cypress Reservation in Hendry County, Florida
- Coordinates: 26.2942°N 80.9692°W
- Accreditation: American Association of Museums
- Owner: Seminole Tribe of Florida
- Website: www.ahtahthiki.com

Ah-Tah-Thi-Ki is a museum of Seminole culture and history, located on the Big Cypress Reservation in Hendry County, Florida. The museum is owned and operated by the Seminole Tribe of Florida. The museum itself was named in a Seminole language phrase: Ah-Tah-Thi-Ki, which means "a place to learn, a place to remember".

Location of where the Ah-Tah-Thi-Ki Seminole Museum

The museum opened in 1997. It has been designated a Smithsonian Institution Affiliate. The Museum was accredited by the American Association of Museums in 2009 and it was the first tribally owned museum to receive this title.

== Archives ==
The Ah-Tah-Thi-Ki Seminole Indian Museum Oral History Program preserves Seminole history, memory, and culture by recording the spoken word. The oral history collection includes interviews conducted in Miccosukee and Mvskoke language.

These interviews can be translated into English but only when it is approved and accepted by the Seminole Tribal citizens. This collection includes a variety of VHS, DVD, CD, audio cassette tapes, DAT tapes, reel-to-reel, BETA, and other types of media documentation.

The museum maintains the Seminole Indian Library and Archives in order to preserve and make accessible Seminole and Native American history for use by scholars and the general public. Holdings include:

- government documents dating from the early 19th century to mid-20th century covering 60 Native American tribes; within these documents, there is information regarding the interactions between the United States government and different Native tribes
- newspaper collection that includes information relating to the Indian removal, Seminole wars, and the relationships between the Indians and whites
- The Ethel Cutler Freeman Collection which was a mixture of photographs, travel diaries, and manuscripts that ranged from 1939 to 1967
- The Boehmer Photographs Collection
- The Brown Family Letters Collection: letters that were written by two individuals who lived during the Seminole wars and described their experience with it
- various tribal memorabilia including objects that represent activities and events from the Seminole Tribe of Florida

The library of the Ah-Tah-Thi-Ki Seminole Museum has 375 linear feet of shelves. Individuals, including researchers, can use these items in the library, but these cannot be borrowed or accessed outside the library's domain.

== Conservation program ==
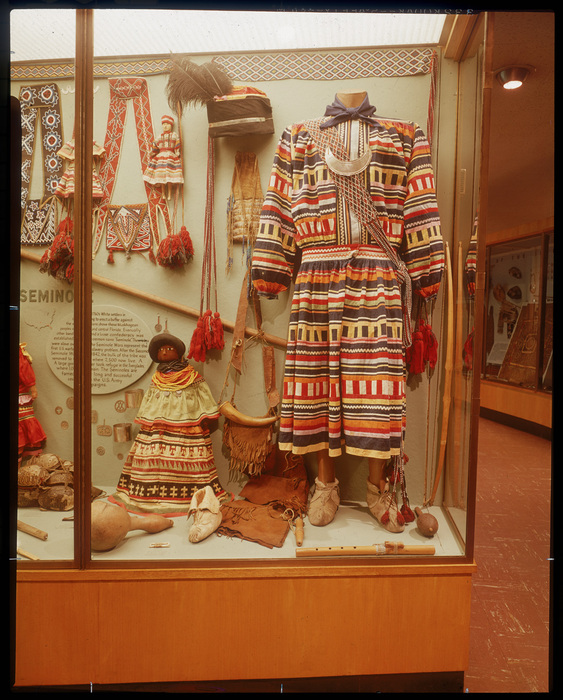
Exhibition of Seminole clothing, dolls, and accessories, National Museum of the American Indian. These textiles would be the types of artifacts that conservation would care for.

The Seminole museum has a conservation program. The purpose of the conservation program is to examine, document, and treat any artifact that belongs to the Seminole heritage and culture. The conservation efforts are a process that requires lots of consideration and care, and these efforts are to ensure that the artifact will remain intact for as long as possible, while still being integrated into the Ah-Tah-Thi-Ki museum as a useful resource.

== Collections ==
=== Permanent collection ===
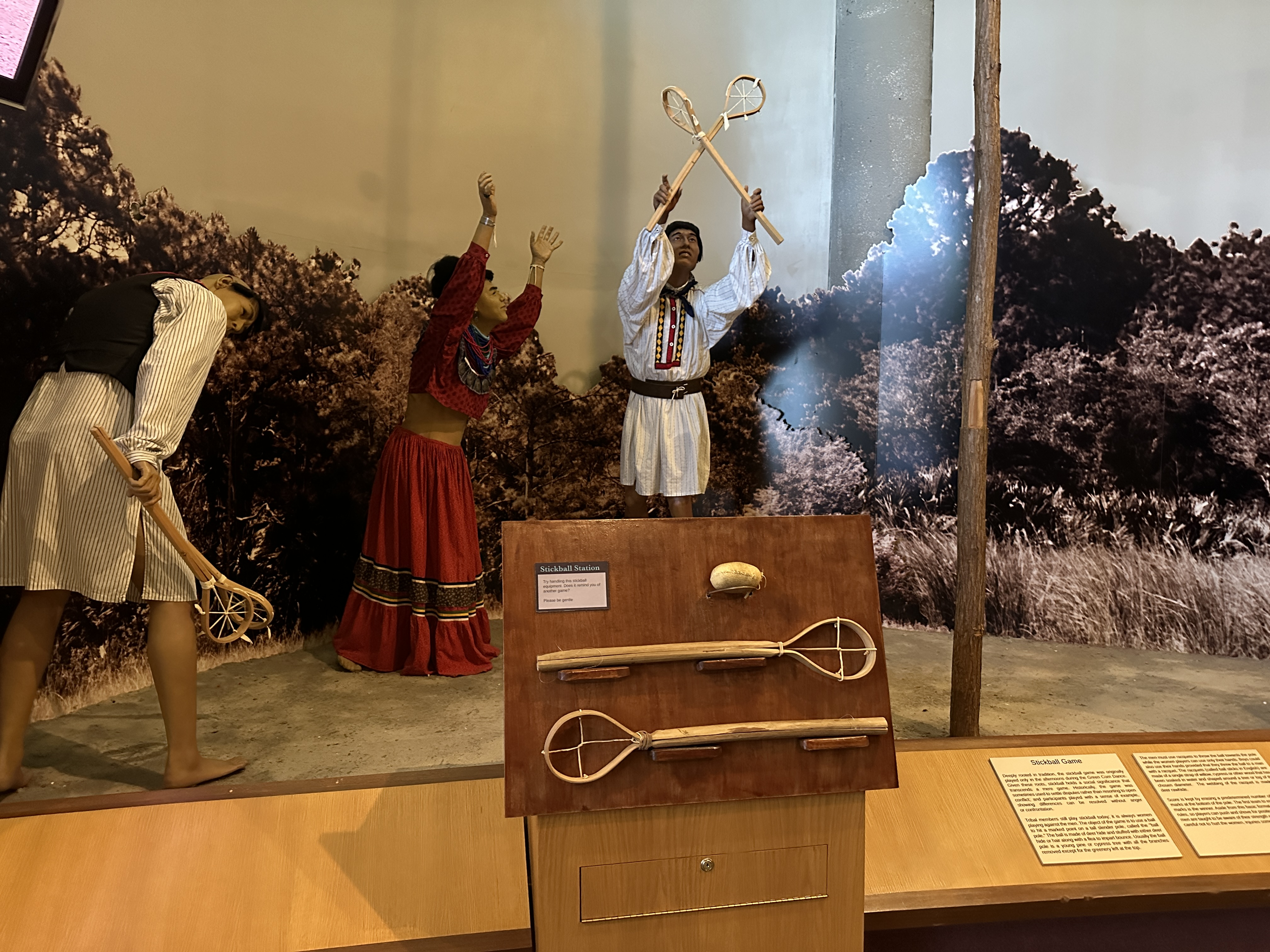
Exhibit on Indigenous North American stickball, a sport similar to modern day lacrosse.

The museum hosts a collection of nearly 200,000 items, and rotates what items are on display and which are held in storage. These items include patchwork clothing, dolls, baskets, beadwork, sculptures, paintings, and more. Each exhibit within the museum has a theme, such as rituals and ceremonies, daily life, and artwork. Throughout the museum are interactive portions that allow visitors to get a better sense of the topic and artifacts they are learning about. In addition to the displays, there is a fifteen-minute video that is played in an auditorium just beyond the entrance to the museum. This video details the history of the tribe and the museum. Additionally, it provides context for what visitors will see in the rest of the museum, and provides information as to why the museum is located where it is, why its development was deemed necessary, and what purpose it serves.

==== Oral history collection ====
The Ah-Tah-Thi-Ki Museum hosts an Oral History Program, with the goal of preserving "Seminole history, memory, and culture by recording Tribal members telling their own story." These interviews and recordings are only available to Seminole Tribal Members.

=== Online collection ===
The museum contains an online collection database. Through this database, one can have remote access to a variety of documents including archives and random images related to the Seminole Tribe and other tribes. This database can be searched by category (i.e. photos, objects, archives, etc.), keyword, or advanced based on subject, title, or other criteria.

== Education ==
=== Education Division ===
The Seminole Museum has an Education Division. The museum offers a range number of curricula programming that helps Seminole Trial members and non-tribal members learn about and engage with Seminole stories, history, and culture. This specific division includes tours and programs that support students (and other interested individuals) in learning and understanding the Seminole peoples' culture and history. The division is not just limited to onsite tours and programs- it also has online accessible educational resources that teachers and students in the classroom can utilize.

=== American Indian Arts Celebration ===
The Ah-Tah-Thi-Ki Museum hosts the American Indian Arts Celebration (AIAC), where visitors can "enjoy traditional and contemporary arts and crafts, dance, music, food, special presentations, wildlife shows, Native vendors," and more.

== Publications ==
The museum publishes a quarterly newsletter, Ah-Tah-Thi-Ki Quarterly, which is available to members of the museum. However, the museum does upload the annual report edition of the newsletter to the website, where you can read about what big events have happened at the museum in the last year, how they have engaged with the community, and what they have been working on and the progress they made.

== Boardwalk ==
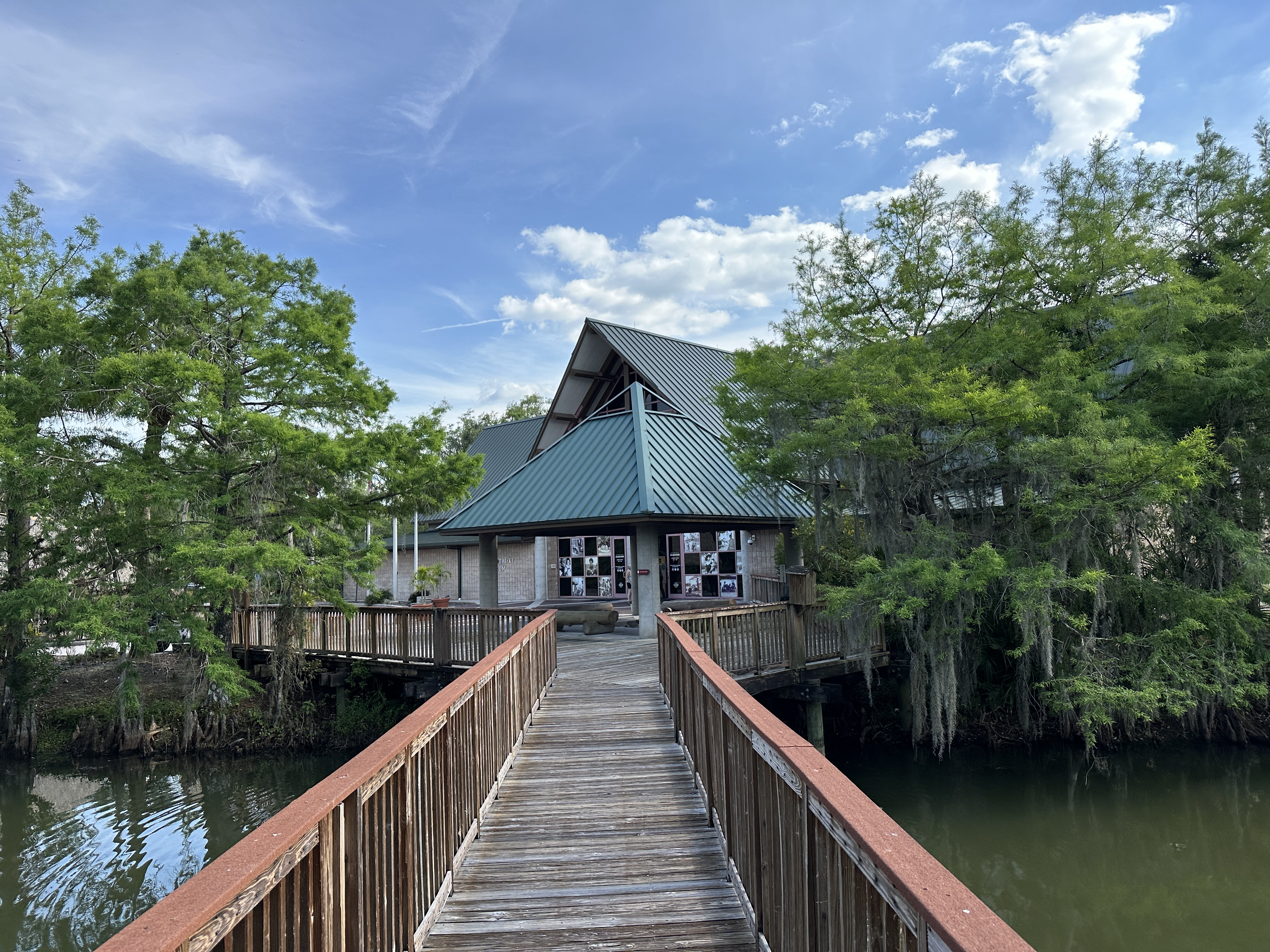
Boardwalk to the entrance of the Ah-Tah-Thi-Ki Museum

Beyond the museum's main building, there is a mile-long boardwalk through a 60-acre cypress dome, as well as the Seminole Village, which is a modern version of the older Seminole tourist camps. The boardwalk has signs periodically that discuss the different plants and animals found in the cypress dome. The signs discuss what the plant or animal was, its name in the Maskókî and Mikisúkî languages, and what the Seminole Tribe used it for. These signs connect tribal use and tradition with the natural world around visitors. There are signs by the Seminole Village that have thought-provoking questions accompanied by information on events that contextualize them.

== History ==
The Ah-Tah-Thi-Ki Museum was finished in the year 1989, but it was not until August 21, 1997, that people were able to visit the museum. This opening day was a special day because it helped commemorate the 40th anniversary of the federal recognition of the Seminole Tribe of Florida. The Museum has undergone different renovations and directors since its opening. In 2005, the museum added a small satellite location within the Seminole Paradise area of Seminole Hard Rock Hotel and Casino in Hollywood- this location was then closed in 2009. One of the first executive directors of the museum was Billy L. Cypress. Mr. Cypress was a member of the Seminole Tribe of Florida and of the Bear Clan. He was also a US Army veteran and college graduate with an English master's degree and post-graduate work in History. Mr. Billy L. Cypress died in 2004, and the next director was Tina M. Osceola who was in that position until June 2011. The most current executive director of the museum is Gordon 'Ollie" Wareham- the nephew of the late Billy L. Cypress. The efforts of these individuals and the changes throughout the museum have helped the cultural institution prosper.

== Seminole Tribe of Florida ==
The Seminole Tribe of Florida maintains the museum.

Seminole people were established in Florida by the 18th century, but after many conflicts and wars, they were forced to relocate away from Florida. These relocated groups became two individual groups, which are the Seminole Nation of Oklahoma and the Miccosukee Tribe of Indians of Florida. A small group of about 300-700 Seminole people resisted the relocation and remained in Florida. This small group of Seminole people continued with their ancestral legacy by practicing their cultural traditions and relying on matriarchal clans, and after much anticipation, in 1957, the Seminole Tribe was finally recognized federally as the Seminole Tribe of Florida.

When the Spanish arrived in Florida, they met the Miccosukee people, which were the ancestors of the Seminole Tribe. Initially, the Seminole tribe continued with their way of living by trading (with other tribes and colonists) and practicing their traditions, but eventually, the United States would start encroaching onto their land, igniting the first disputes between Native people and the settlers. When Andrew Jackson became the seventh president, he signed into law a policy that would force all Indians that were living East of the Mississippi river to move West. The Native people tried to fight for their homes, and many were forced to move, but a few people followed a Native leader: Abiaki. Abiaki, who was also known as Sam Jones, was a Mikasuki tribe member. He was a medicine man and his care and guidance for his tribe earned him respect and recognition from others. The American soldiers nicknamed Abiaki "The Devil" because he was a great leader, strategist, and spy along with being a healer (medicine man). Abiaki avoided negotiation with the Americans because he strongly opposed the relocation of his people away from their land. After the wars and a great loss of native people, Abiaki led the remaining two hundred Seminole Indians into the deep wetlands of Florida. This native group survived the persecution that was occurring at that time, and today, they strive as their own community with more than five thousand tribal members. These movements led way to the creation of the Ah-Tah-Thi-Ki Seminole Museum which today continues to keep Seminole traditions and history alive for others.
