= Susie Billie =

Seminole medicine woman

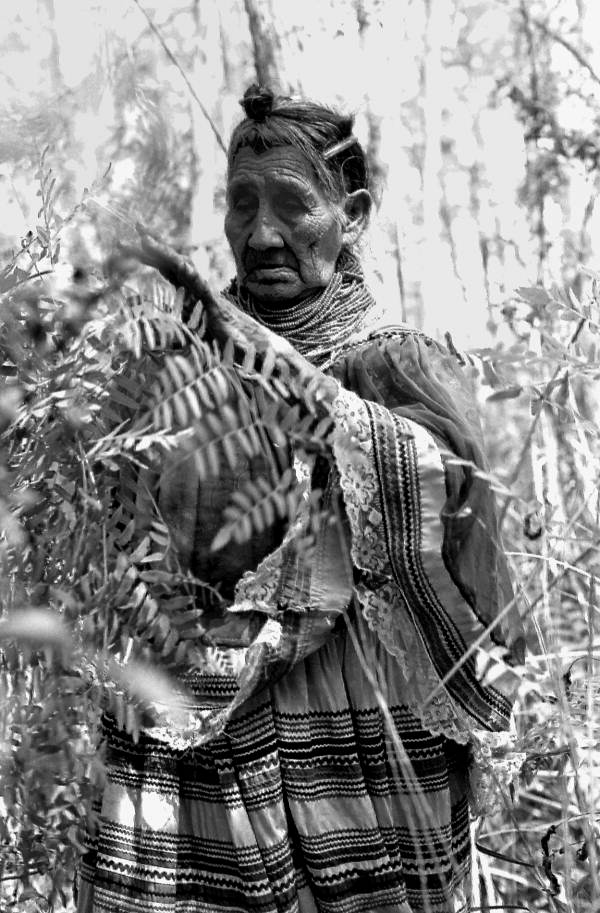
- Born: 1900; Collier County, Florida, US
- Died: 2003 (aged 102–103); Big Cypress Indian Reservation
- Other names: Susie Jim Billie
- Known for: Medicinal herbs
- Children: Agnes Cypress
- Relatives: Buffalo Jim, Sonny Billie
- Awards: 1985 Florida Folk Heritage Award

Susie Jim Billie (1900–2003) was a Seminole traditional maker of medicine and grand matriarch of the Panther clan in her region. She was born at the turn of the last century in Collier County, Florida in the United States, and resided on the Big Cypress Reservation, where she practiced traditional healing arts for her community. Billie received most of her training in folk medicine from her grandfather and uncle, who were medicine men of the tribe. She knew not only the herbal remedies for physical ailments, but the songs, chants, and ritual expressions that lent power to cures as well.

She was part of a family of medicine men and women. She taught her nephew, Sonny Billie, about traditional healing plants and herbs and her brother, Buffalo Jim, was a Mikasuki medicine man. She was renowned for her wisdom of plants and songs and healing rituals.

== Recognition ==
In 1984, Billie was interviewed as part of the Seminole Video Project from Florida Folklife Program and WFSU -TV. The interview was published as part of the "Four Corners of the Earth Documentary".

In 1985 Susie Jim Billie received the Florida Folk Heritage Award as a Medicine Woman and authority on Tribal heritage in White Springs Florida.

She participated twice as a master artist in the Florida Folklife Apprenticeship Program, passing her knowledge on to her daughter Agnes Cypress and to Mary Johns.

She is quoted heavily as part of Harry Kersey Jr.'s book The Florida Seminoles and the New Deal, 1933–1942.
