= Ahfachkee School =

Ahfachkee Day School

Location
- 31200 Josie Billie Highway; Clewiston, Florida 33440; United States; 26°19′02″N 80°59′16.3″W

Information
- Type: Public
- NCES School ID: 590009200041
- Teaching staff: 37 (FTE)
- Grades: PreK to 12
- Enrollment: 147 (2021–22)
- Student to teacher ratio: 3.97
- Website: ahfachkeeschool.seminoleeao.com

Ahfachkee School, also known as Ahfachkee Day School, is a tribal K–12 school in unincorporated Hendry County, Florida, on the Big Cypress Reservation, with a Clewiston postal address. It is affiliated with the Bureau of Indian Education (BIE).

As of 2007 about 80% of the funding comes from the Seminole tribe and 20% comes from the BIE.

The word "Ahfachkee" means "happy".

== History ==
In 1970 the school had grades 1–5 and at the time it was operated by the Bureau of Indian Affairs (BIA). According to the government employees, the school was needed because the 45 miles (72 km) distance to Hendry County School District-operated public schools in Clewiston was significant.

== Curriculum and programming ==
The school requires its students to take cultural classes in cooking, making textiles, and in agriculture, in addition to regular academic courses.

In 1969 graduate students of Florida Atlantic University helped students create their own textbooks and collectively improve each other's English reading skills.

== Operations ==
In 1970 students on the reservation were not required to attend school, and as a result school absenteeism was common.

== Campus ==
In 1970 the school had a cafeteria and three classrooms.

== Student body ==
In 1970 it had 47 students.

In 2007 it had 150 students.

== Academic achievement ==
In 1970 Kent Pollock of the Palm Beach Post stated that the school's students had poor academic results.
