= Marcellus Osceola Jr. =

Seminole Tribal Council Chairman

Marcellus W. Osceola Jr.

7th Tribal Council Chairman of the Seminole Tribe of Florida
- Incumbent
- Assumed office January 9, 2017
- Deputy: Mitchell Cypress
- Preceded by: James E. Billie

Marcellus William Osceola Jr. (born in 1972) is the current and 7th Tribal Council Chairman of the Seminole Tribe of Florida. Osceola won a special election in 2016 to replace James Billie, who was ousted following a recall petition and was re-elected to a full term in 2019.

Osceola is the grandson of Bill Osceola, the tribe's first Tribal Council Chairman, serving from 1957 to 1967.

Osceola first ran unsuccessfully for a seat on the board of directors of the Seminole Tribe of Florida Inc., which manages the tribe's non-gaming business interests, in 2003 and was finally elected in 2009 on his third try. In 2011, he was elected as the Hollywood District representative to the Tribal Council.

An entrepreneur, Osceola ran a limousine company, lawn company, and seafood company prior to becoming chairman. He lives on the Hollywood Seminole Reservation.

In 2019, Osceola informed Florida Gov. Ron DeSantis that the tribe would end annual casino payments to the state due to a long-running dispute over other gambling activities in the state.
