= Brighton Reservation =

Seminole Indian Reservation in Florida, United States

Coordinates: 27°04′46″N 81°04′11″W

- Indian reservation
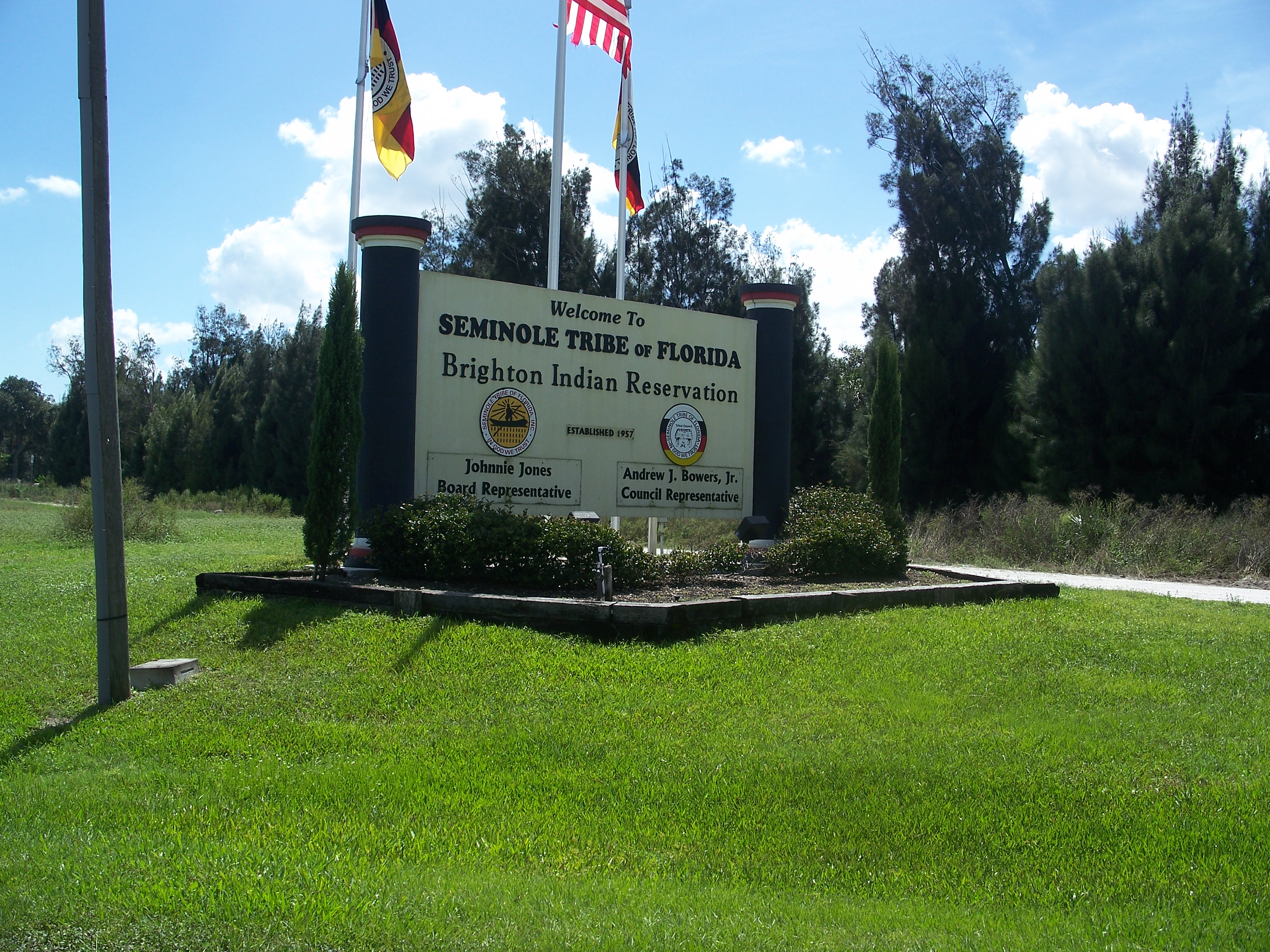
- Entrance to reservation

- Location of Brighton Seminole Indian Reservation
- Tribe: Seminole
- Country: United States
- State: Florida
- County: Glades

Area
  - Total: 146 km^{2} (56 sq mi)
- Website: official webpage

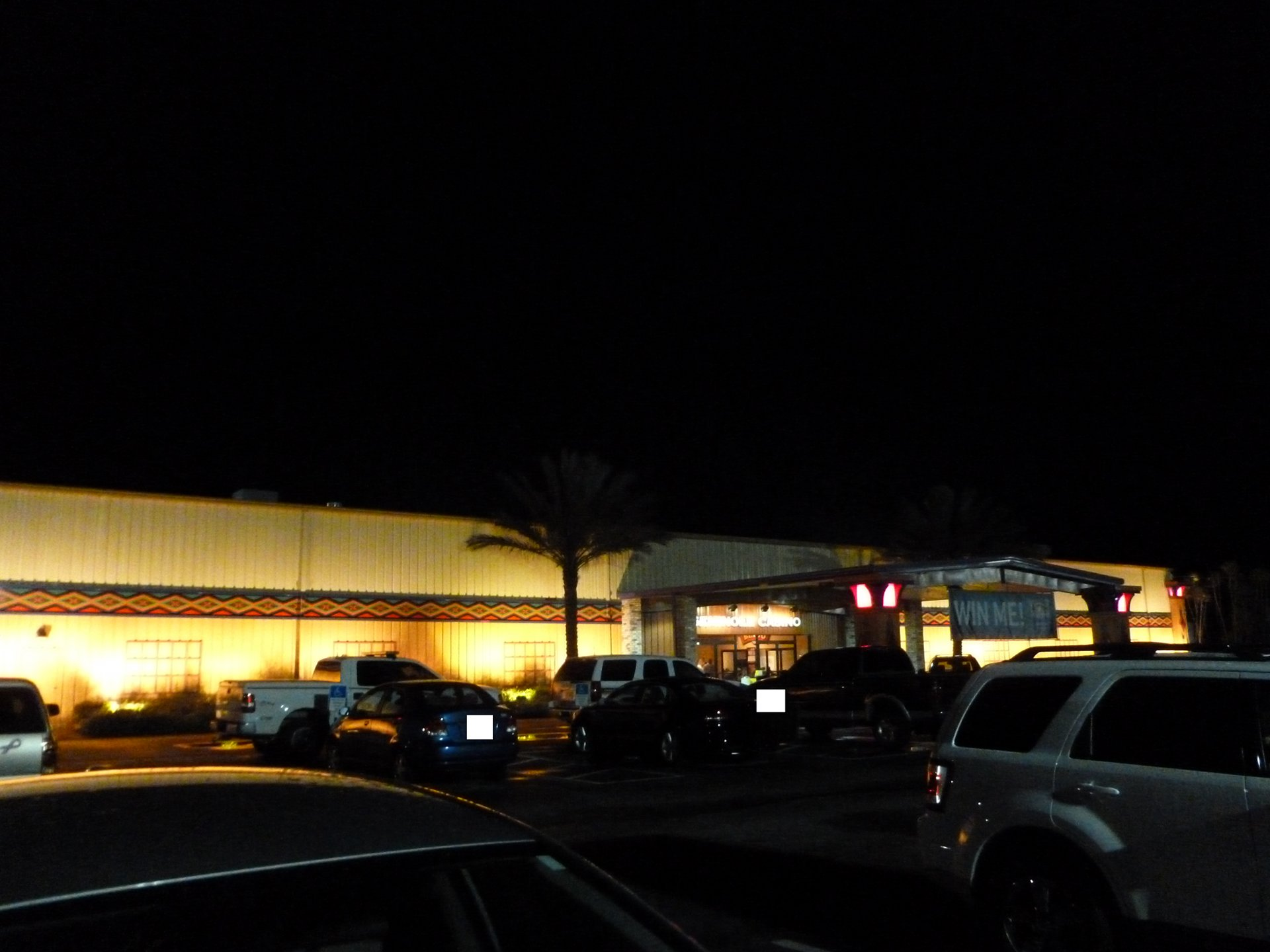
Seminole Casino in Brighton

Brighton Reservation is an Indian reservation of the Seminole Tribe of Florida, located in northeast Glades County near the northwest shore of Lake Okeechobee. It is one of six reservations held in trust by the federal government for this tribe. The reservation has a land area of approximately 146 square kilometers or 36,000 acres and a 2000 census resident population of 566 persons.

The Florida guide referred to a "Seminole Village" in 1939, south of the town of Brighton, on a 35,660-acre reservation:

Here approximately 100 Indians are employed on CCC projects in road building, fencing, water development, and revegetation. All this group are Cow Creek, or Muskogee, differing in language from the Big Cypress Indians of the west coast, who are Mikasuki. Reservation Indians farm the center of cleared hammocks and herd some 800 head of Hereford and Angus cattle on a subsistence basis. Families live in groups of palm-thatched chuckoos, 10 feet by 12 feet, containing raised sleeping platforms covered with mosquito netting. One chuckoo serves as the family dining room, another as the kitchen. Both children and adults receive instruction in the village school, which is equipped with modern facilities, including a community workroom and shop, men's and women's showers, and a laundry.

— Federal Writers' Project, "Part III: The Florida Loop", Florida: A Guide to the Southernmost State (1947)

== Language ==
Some residents of the reservation speak the Muscogee language (or Creek), which is different from the Mikasuki language of other Seminoles and the Miccosukee tribe. Fewer than 200 people on the reservation speak Muscogee, which is the largest number of speakers in Florida and outside of Oklahoma. The Muscogee language is considered "definitely endangered" by UNESCO.

== Economic Development ==
The Seminole Tribe of Florida operates the Brighton Seminole Casino here, a 27,000-square-foot casino with 375-slot and gaming machines, a seven-table poker room, and high-stake bingo seats, with full-service restaurant and lounge.

To serve the Seminole cattle business, "The Red Barn" was built in 1941 with help from the Civilian Conservation Corps. Hurricane Wilma damaged the roof, which was replaced in 2005.
