= Clay MacCauley =

American minister and missionary (1843–1925)

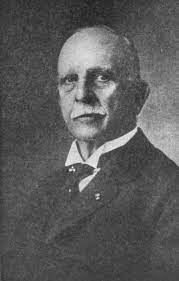
- Photo of Clay MacCauley in his old age
- Born: 1843; Chambersburg, Pennsylvania, US
- Died: 1925 (aged 81–82); California, US
- Education: Northwestern Theological Seminary

Clay MacCauley (1843–1925) was an American Civil War veteran, Unitarian minister, pioneering American missionary in Japan, author of several books, head of the Senshin Sakuin School for advanced learning in Japan, and organizing leader of the American Association of Tokyo. Clay also made lasting impacts as a Unitarian minister all around the United States, including Detroit, Washington, DC, and New York.

== Early life and education ==
MacCauley was born in Chambersburg, Pennsylvania, in 1843, the only child of Isaac H. MacCauley and Elizabeth Maxwell. He was raised in a strict Calvinist Presbyterian home. Education was also important to the MacCauley family; Clay was well educated at the Chambersburg Academy and the Moravian School. In 1859 he enrolled in Dickinson College as a sophomore, but left in 1860 after hearing Abraham Lincoln speak about patriotism and attempted to enlist in the military. MacCauley was unable to enlist because he was underage. In 1861, he transferred to Princeton University where he studied religion and philosophy. MacCauley interrupted his studies in 1862 to fight in the American Civil War. In 1863, he returned to Princeton and graduated in 1864.

In 1864, MacCauley enrolled in Western Theological Seminary, but left to join his parents in Chicago, where he enrolled in the Theological Seminary of the Northwest and graduated in 1867.

In 1873, he studied philosophy and theology at Heidelberg and Leipzig.

== Civil War ==
In 1862, MacCauley enlisted with the 126th Pennsylvania Regiment and fought with them in the First Battle of Rappahannock Station and the Battle of Fredericksburg. On February 24, 1863, he was promoted to the rank of second lieutenant. MacCauley participated in the Battle of Chancellorsville, joining the battle on May 3. He was captured in the battle and interned at Libby Prison in Richmond, Virginia.

After spending two weeks at Libby Prison, MacCauley was freed as part of a prisoner exchange. He returned to Princeton and completed his studies in 1864, after which he returned to the army and served as part of the United States Christian Commission which provided care for the wounded and distributed religious literature. He continued to work with the organization until the end of the Civil War.

== Religious career ==
To become a pastor, Clay MacCauley attended Northwestern Theological Seminary to study theology. He started to have doubts about a few of the rigid Calvinist principles he had grown up with. He questioned several Presbyterian beliefs rather than his belief in God. In the end, the Presbytery of Chicago decided to grant Clay MacCauley a preaching license. He received a license on probation and practiced preaching for a while in Morrison, Illinois. When MacCauley's beliefs on specific subjects, such as the atonement, changed, he was subsequently denied ordination. Then, MacCauley embraced the liberal branch of Unitarianism.

He visited the entire nation and gave sermons in numerous cities. Prior to being ordained as a Unitarian minister in Rochester, New York, MacCauley spent six months preaching in Detroit. Moreover, MacCauley gave sermons in Washington, D.C. MacCauley preached to numerous senators, officials, and even Spencer Fullerton Baird, a fellow Dickinsonian, while he was living in Washington, D.C. In 1867, Clay MacCauley married Annie Cleveland Deane. After Annie died in 1887, MacCauley did not remarry. MacCauley's wife played a key role in introducing him to Unitarianism. In Maine, Annie had a connection to a Unitarian church. C.C. Everett, the pastor of that congregation, introduced MacCauley to the Unitarians in Chicago.

Clay MacCauley had traveled extensively. For the Smithsonian Institute's Bureau of American Ethnology, he devoted a significant amount of time to researching the Seminole Indians in Florida. Spencer Fullerton Baird served as the Smithsonian Institution's secretary at the time. To study philosophy, Clay Macauley went to Germany. He drew heavily on this experience to write a number of philosophical books.

== Japan Mission ==
The American Unitarian Association opened a branch in Tokyo, Japan, in 1889. One of the mission's representatives for the Unitarian faith, Clay MacCauley, was dispatched to Tokyo. At this time, Western Christian missionaries were starting to gain popularity in the East. A key objective of the Unitarian mission was education. The Senshin Sakuin School for Advanced Learning was led by Clay MacCauley. The study of religion, ethics, and social science from a scientific and philosophical perspective was the school's main focus. Instead of promoting one faith over another, the school wanted to encourage "open inquiry". The institution employed teachers from a range of religious traditions. The liberal beliefs and intellectualism of Clay Macauley are embodied in this institution. In contrast to other missionary activities at the time, the Unitarian movement in Japan was unique. Its goal was not to force Unitarianism on the Japanese people. Its objective was to advance religious instruction and study. The Unitarian mission aimed to foster the expansion of spiritual and ethical life in Japan in a similar manner to how Japan was strengthening its position as an economic superpower. From 1889 through 1900, Clay MacCauley remained in Japan. MacCauley lived in the US until 1909, at which point he left again for Japan, where he remained until 1919. Clay MacCauley served as the lone American member of the Unitarian mission in Japan for a considerable amount of time. In 1912, during his second mission period in Japan, he organized the American Association of Japan and served on its governance council.

=== Leadership roles ===
- Governing Council, American Association of Japan (1912)
- President of the Asiatic Society of Japan (1910–16).
- Vice president of the International Press Association[Tokyo] (1915-1916)
- President of the American Peace Society of Japan (1916-1919)

== Death and legacy ==
The foundation of MacCauley's life was formed by his mission in Japan. Japanese history and culture captivated him. He developed fluency in Japanese and authored a book on the subject. Japan has a memorial for Clay MacCauley. Upon his return to the United States, MacCauley frequently discussed and wrote about Japan and made an effort to inform Americans about the country. Clay MacCauley retired in 1919 in California. In 1925, he died.

=== Honors ===
- Japanese Imperial Honors
  - Order of the Rising Sun, 1909
  - Order of the Sacred Treasure, 1918
- Red Cross Service Badge, 1920

== Bibliography ==
- The Seminole Indians of Florida: With Original Illustrations (1884), republished by Tradition Classics in 2012, Madison and Adams Press in 2018
  - Contained in Native Americans: 22 Books on History, Mythology, Culture & Linguistic Studies: History of the Great Tribes, Military History, Language, Customs & Legends of Cherokee, Iroquois, Sioux, Navajo, Zuñi, Apache, Seminole and Eskimo (2018) e-artnow
- An Introductory Course in Japanese (1896), Kelly & Walsh
  - posthumous new edition and title Outline of Japanese Grammar, Department of Oriental Languages, University of California (1938)
  - additional edition published by P. D. and Ione Perkins (1942)
- Christianity in History (1891), republished by WENTWORTH Press 2016
- Japanese Literature (1898), Japan Mail Office, republished by Creative Media Partners, LLC in 2015, Fb&c Ltd in 2017 and 2018
- A Straightforward Tale (1899), Anti-Imperialist League, republished by Forgotten Press in 2018, Creative Media Partners, LLC in 2021
- The Hohenzollern Dynasty: Motive and Movement (1916)
- Krause's League for Human Right and Thereby World Peace (1917), The Fukuin Printing Company Ltd
- The Heusken Memorial: An Old Story Retold (1917)
- Looking Before and After: Some War-time Essays (1919), Kelly & Walsh

=== Published addresses ===
- The Fruits of Imperialism: Addresses Delivered Before the Massachusetts Reform Club, June 6, 1902 (1902), G.H. Ellis Company, Printers
