= Chickee =

Type of tent used by certain American Indian tribes

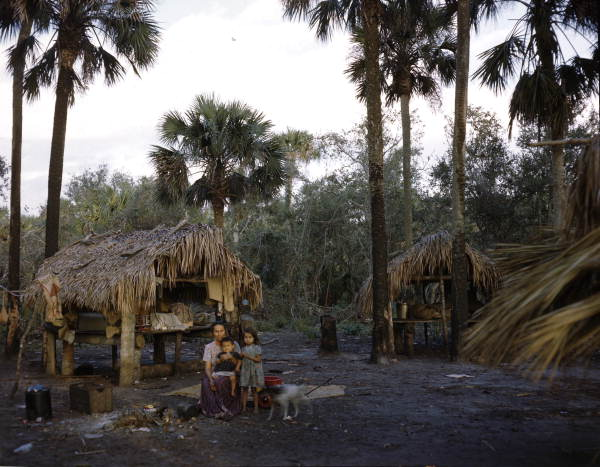
A mother and children at a camp on the Brighton Reservation in Glades County, Florida, 1949

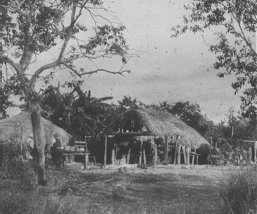
A camp with a sleep chickee, cooking chickee, and eating chickee

Chikee or Chickee (Creek: cuko, Mikasuki: chikít, transl. "house") is a shelter supported by posts, with a raised floor, a thatched roof and open sides. Chickees are also known as chickee huts, stilt houses, or platform dwellings. The chickee style of architecture—palmetto thatch over a bald cypress log frame—was adopted by Seminoles during the Second (1835–1842) and Third (1855–1858) Seminole Wars as U.S. troops pushed them deeper into the Everglades and surrounding territory. Before the Second Seminole War, the Seminoles had lived in log cabins. Similar structures were used by the tribes in south Florida when the Spanish first arrived in the 16th century. Each chickee had a specific purpose and together they were organized within a camp-type community. Chickees were used for cooking, sleeping, and eating.

== Modern use ==
Chickees continue to be used by Native American villages of the Miccosukee in the Everglades. Some upscale homes in southern Florida feature chickee-inspired buildings as garden or poolside structures. A few restaurants in Florida still use this indigenous design to attract visitors.

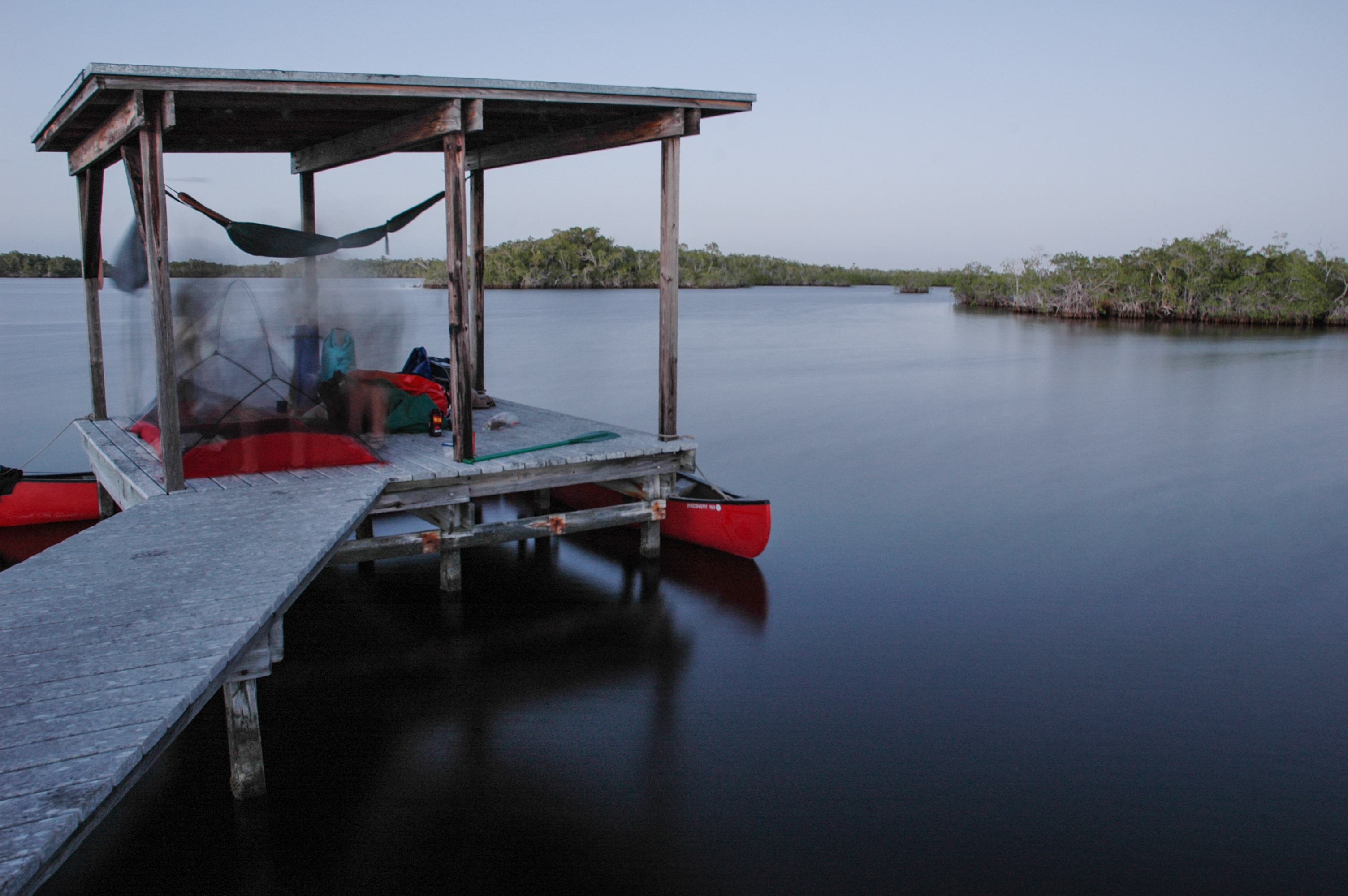
Campers set up tents on a chickee in the Everglades National Park backcountry

Chickees are also used in backcountry areas of Everglades National Park including along the Everglades Wilderness Waterway where mangroves or wetlands prevent camping on dry land. Made and maintained primarily for backcountry campers, the wooden structures stand several feet above the water and can usually accommodate four to five campers. These structures have portable restrooms. Some "double chickees" are linked by a walkway and are for eight to 10 people. There are about eight to ten chickees in a village. Chickees are very helpful, especially in the rain. Similar structures, while not referred to as chickees, are present further north in the Okefenokee National Wildlife Refuge in Folkston, Georgia.

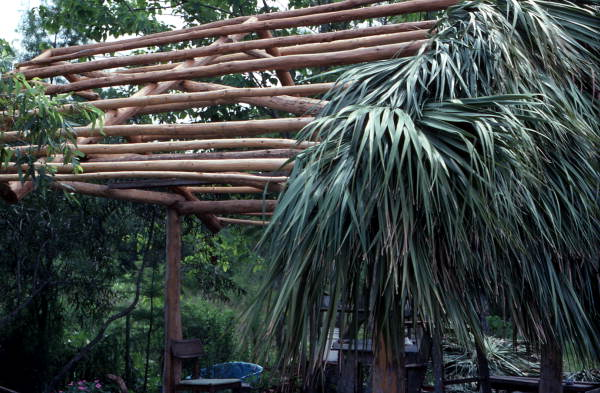
A partially built chickee showing thatching process on the Big Cypress Reservation in South Florida

== See also ==
- Palapa – a structure with thatched roof and open sides in Mexico
