= Betty Mae Tiger Jumper =

Chief of the Seminole Tribe of Florida (1923–2011)

- Potackee
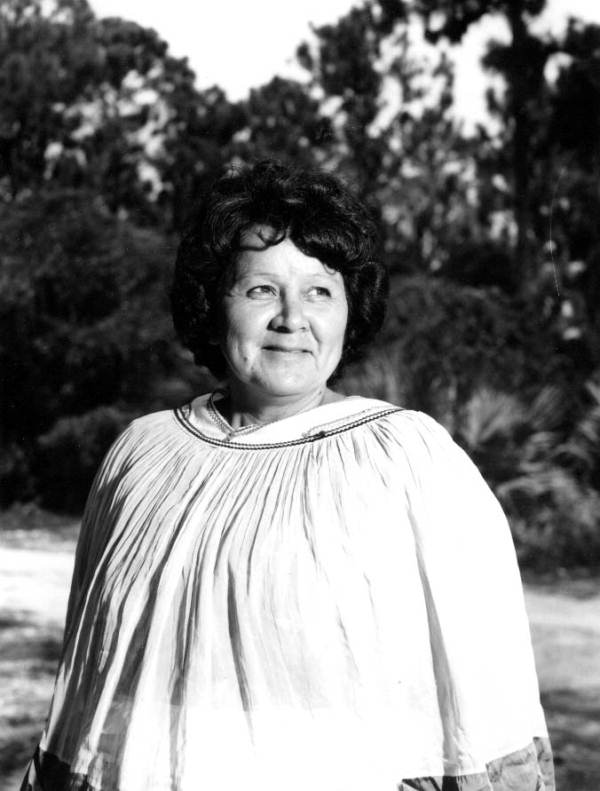

2nd Tribal Council Chairman of the Seminole Tribe of Florida
- In office 1967–1971
- Preceded by: Bill Osceola
- Succeeded by: Howard Tommie

Personal details
- Born: April 27, 1923 Indiantown, Florida
- Died: January 14, 2011 (aged 87)
- Resting place: New Seminole Cemetery
- Spouse: Moses Jumper

Betty Mae Tiger Jumper, also known as Potackee (April 27, 1923 – January 14, 2011) (Seminole), was the first and so far the only female chairperson of the Seminole Tribe of Florida. A nurse, she co-founded the tribe's first newspaper in 1956, the Seminole News, later replaced by The Seminole Tribune, for which she served as editor, winning a Lifetime Achievement Award from the Native American Journalists Association. In 2001 she published her memoir, entitled A Seminole Legend.

Tiger was the first Florida Seminole to learn to read and write English, and the first to graduate from high school and a nursing program. In addition to serving as editor of the newspaper, she was Communications Director for the tribe.

== Early life and education ==
Born Betty Mae Tiger on April 27, 1923, in a Seminole camp near Indiantown, Florida, she was the daughter of Ada Tiger, a Seminole woman of the Snake clan, and a French trapper, Abe Partan. Her grandmother Mary Tiger picked her Seminole name of Potackee. Under the Seminole matrilineal kinship system, Betty Mae was given her mother's surname.

The tribe so discouraged intermarriage with whites that sometimes they left mixed-race children in the Everglades to die. When Betty Mae was five, some Seminole medicine men threatened to put her and her younger brother to death, because their father was white. Her great-uncle resisted the men and moved the family to the Dania reservation in Broward County, where the government protected the children. At the time, her mother had to leave nearly 500 head of cattle; she sold some and offered others to the tribe for people who needed food.

Betty Mae's first languages were Mikasuki and Creek, as relatives spoke both. At night she often listened as older members of the tribe told stories passed down from their ancestors. "The stories taught you how to live," she said. She would later record the stories for future generations.

Tiger decided she had to learn how to read and write. In the segregated school system of Florida, neither the white nor the black schools would accept Seminole children. Tiger decided to go to a federal Indian boarding school, and enrolled at one in Cherokee, North Carolina, along with her cousin Mary and younger brother.

She started learning English at age 14. She became the first formally educated Seminole of her tribe, as well as the first to read and write English; she graduated from high school in 1945. Betty Tiger enrolled in a nursing program at the Kiowa Indian Hospital in Oklahoma, which she completed the following year. The Seminole then were still very traditional, and many would only accept care from Medicine Men. Her family had roles as medicine people: her mother, uncles and great-uncle Jimmy. Unlike the Medicine Men, her mother was willing also to accept white doctors and hospitals, whatever would help sick people.

== Marriage and family ==
After finishing the nursing program, Tiger returned to Florida, where she did field training. She married Moses Jumper, and they had a son Moses and two daughters, who died young. After that, they adopted two Seminole children, Boettner Roger and Scarlet.

== Career ==
Betty Tiger Jumper worked as a nurse for 40 years to improve health care in the Seminole community, initially traveling a large circuit to the various small communities of the areas that became Big Cypress, Brighton and Hollywood reservations. "As the people came out of the swamps", as she said, she and another nurse inoculated many children with vaccinations for the first time. She and her mother, who was a midwife, would work to persuade women to go to the hospital when needed, as they began to adapt to the new world.

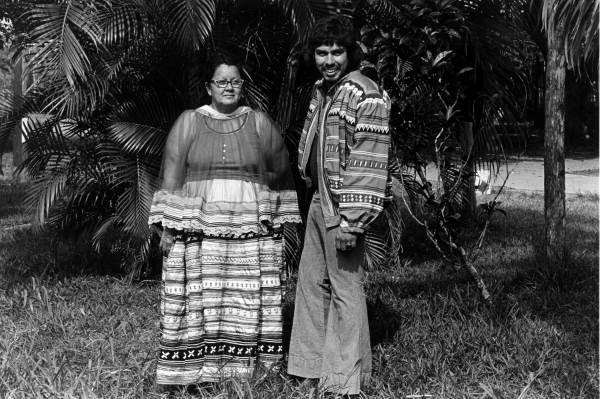
Jumper and future Seminole Tribe of Florida Chairman James E. Billie in 1973

In 1956, Tiger Jumper was co-founder of a tribal newsletter, called the Seminole News. It closed a short time after others took it over.

In 1967 Betty Mae Tiger Jumper was elected as the first female chairwoman, or chief, of the Seminole tribe, a decade after it gained federal recognition. She founded the United South and Eastern Tribes (USET), a group to run health and education programs for its members; it also became a powerful lobby with the states and Congress. In 1970, she was one of two women appointed by President Richard M. Nixon to the National Congress on Indian Opportunity. She served on the council for a total of 16 years.

Thanks to her leadership, the Seminole Tribe went from near bankruptcy in 1967 to having $500,000 when she left office in 1971. "I had three goals in my life," Mrs. Jumper said in 1999. "To finish school, to take nurse's training and come back and work among my people, and to write three books." She met those goals and many more.

In the 1970s, the Alligator News was founded as the tribal newspaper. After it was renamed as The Seminole Tribune, Tiger-Jumper served as editor for several years and also became Communication Director for the Tribe. She wrote many articles about tribal traditions and culture. By 1999, the paper had four Seminoles working on it and five or six whites, and was being distributed across the country and internationally. Tiger-Jumper was awarded the first Lifetime Achievement Award by the Native American Journalists Association.

== Books ==
- And With the Wagon - Came God's Word
- Legends of the Seminoles, illustrated by Guy La Bree (children's book, 1994)
- with Patsy West, A Seminole Legend (2001)

She narrated a video, The Corn Lady, telling a Seminole traditional story.

== Later years ==
By the time she published her memoir in 2001, A Seminole Legend, Tiger-Jumper also had created her own website. The last surviving matriarch of the Snake clan, she died peacefully in her sleep on January 14, 2011.

== Legacy and honors ==
- In 1989, the monthly Seminole Tribune was the first Native American newspaper to win a Robert F. Kennedy Journalism Award. That year, it was also nominated for a Pulitzer Prize.
- In 1994, she was inducted into the Florida Women's Hall of Fame.
- In 1997 she received the first Lifetime Achievement Award ever presented by the Native American Journalists Association.
- In 1997, the Seminole Tribune earned five awards from the Native American Journalists Association.
- In 1997, she was named "Woman of the Year" by the Florida Commission on the Status of Women.
- She received an honorary Doctorate of Humane Letters from Florida State University.
- In 2019, a historical marker honoring Jumper was erected in Stuart, Florida.
- She received a Florida Department of State Folklife Heritage Award

== See also ==
- List of Native American politicians
- Native American women in politics
