= Bill Osceola =

Seminole leader in Florida, USA (1919–1995)

- Seminole Bill Osceola building his new home at the Dania Indian Reservation November 1956, by photographer Johnson.

1st President of the Seminole Tribe of Florida
- In office 1957–1967

Personal details
- Born: June 30, 1919 Everglades, Broward County, Florida
- Died: April 16, 1995 (aged 75) Hollywood, Florida
- Resting place: Seminole Cemetery West
- Spouse: Charlotte Tommie

Bill Osceola (June 30, 1919 – April 16, 1995) was the first president of the Seminole Tribe of Florida. When the federal government marked his tribe for termination, Osceola came up with the idea of creating a rodeo as a tourist attraction to raise funds. The rodeo earned enough money to pay for tribal representatives to lobby against termination and formally organize as a tribe.

== Early life ==
Bill Osceola was born June 30, 1919 in the Everglades in Broward County, Florida to Jimmy and Mary Motlow-Osceola. His native language was Miccosukee, a Muskogean language. He had no formal education and did not know how to read or write, though he was good with numbers and had an excellent memory. Florida's segregated education laws prohibited the Seminole from attending public schools until the 1960s. He was raised on the Tamiami Trail and moved to the Dania Reservation in 1943.

In 1943, a young pastor, Stanley Smith arrived on the Dania Reservation to assist the Southern Baptist Church leadership. Smith was dynamic and inspired many local Seminole to join the congregation. In 1946, a group of five Seminole youths, including Osceola's cousin, Billy Osceola who became the first tribal chairman of the Seminole Tribe of Florida, attended Florida Bible Institute in Lakeland, Florida and returned as lay ministers causing a schism between the Southern Baptists and Smith's followers. Osceola became ordained as a deacon in 1945 and a minister in 1950. When Smith's group split from the Southern Baptists, Osceola established the Mekusukey Independent Baptist Church in Hollywood, and later that same year established a church at Big Cypress. Later, he established mission churches on the Brighton Reservation and at Tamiami Trail. Bill and Billy often shared pastoral duties, though they were from different Baptist organizations and both Independent and Southern Baptists had congregations on all three Seminole reservations—Dania, Big Cypress and Brighton.

To earn a living, Bill raised cattle (around 300 head) on the Big Cypress Reservation and was a heavy equipment operator.

== Tribal organization ==
In 1953, the Seminole were advised they were on the Congressional list for tribal termination and loss of federal benefits, under the federal Indian termination policy. Being proposed for termination galvanized the tribe into action. On October 9, 1953, an emergency meeting was called at the agency headquarters on the Dania Reservation. There were two issues to be considered: (1) convincing the government that the tribe was not ready to take over management of its own affairs and (2) convincing the government that all Native people living in Florida were not Seminole.

In 1954 on March 1 and 2, designated tribal members testified at a Joint Hearing before the Subcommittees of the Committees on Interior and Insular Affairs of the 83rd Congress. On April 4, 1955, the tribe created a board of directors and appointed Bill Osceola as chairman. The goal was to form a tribal organization before the Clewiston hearings which would begin in two days. On April 6 and 7 of the same year, hearings were held and the tribe requested the continuance of federal government supervision for the next 25 years and separation of the Seminoles from the Miccosukee tribe and Traditional Indians.

Lacking the necessary funds to make repeated trips to Washington, DC and Tallahassee, Florida to argue their case, in 1956, Osceola came up with a plan to build a rodeo arena on the Dania Reservation as a tourist attraction. Because many Seminoles worked on the ranches of South Florida or had ranches of their own and were known as excellent cattlemen and horsemen, Osceola thought the rodeo would be a natural moneymaker. He convinced cattlemen in Brighton to commit cattle and got lumber donations from people in Broward County. Opening day at the Rodeo saw 500 spectators and proceeds were used to organize the tribe and gain federal recognition. The rodeo that Osceola began in an effort to save his tribe was christened on February 7, 1997 as the Bill Osceola Memorial Rodeo, to honor his memory.

By March 26, 1957 a committee, under the chairmanship of Bill Osceola had been formed to draft a constitution and corporate charter. The Constitutional Committee members were: Billy Osceola and John Henry Gopher (Brighton), Bill Osceola and Jack Willie (Dania), Jimmie O. Osceola and Frank J. Billie (Big Cypress), and Larry Mike Osceola (Trail, but not of the Trail faction). Once the documents were prepared meetings were held on each reservation to discuss them with the tribespeople. The constitution and bylaws were accepted by tribal vote on August 21, 1957 by a vote of 241 for and 5 against.

The first officers elected in 1957 for the Seminole tribe were Billy Osceola, Tribal Chairman; Betty Mae Jumper, vice chairman; Laura Mae Osceola, secretary; and the non-Indian wife of an agency employee as treasurer. These officers selected their business officers: Frank Billie, president and Bill Osceola, vice president; however, Billy resigned and Bill Osceola served as first president.

== Personal life ==
Bill married Charlotte Tommie (June 17, 1921 – January 8, 1999) with whom he had four children and adopted two daughters: Priscilla Osceola Sayen (November 24, 1941 – June 2, 2014), Marcellus Osceola (October 22, 1945 - ), and Raymond Osceola (September 8, 1949 – November 12, 2005); Yvonne Osceola Cortney, Judybill Osceola, and Cynthia Osceola.

Bill Osceola died April 16, 1995 in Hollywood, Florida and was buried at Seminole Cemetery West.

His grandson Marcellus Osceola Jr. was elected tribal chairman in 2016 and re-elected in 2019.
