= Florida Folk Festival =

Festival in Hamilton County, Florida, USA

Florida Folk Festival is a long-running annual folk music festival in Hamilton County, Florida. It began in 1953. Thelma Boltin was an organizer for the festival.

The festival has also featured presentations in the Mikasuki language.
