= Big Cypress Reservation =

Coordinates: 26°17′39″N 80°58′09″W

- Reservation
- Location of Big Cypress Reservation in red.
- Country: United States
- State: Florida
- County: Hendry County, Broward County

Government
  - Governing body: Seminole Tribe of Florida

Area
  - Total: 81.972 sq mi (212.306 km^{2})

Population (2010)
  - Total: 591
- Time zone: UTC-5 (EST)
  - Summer (DST): UTC-4 (EDT)
- Website: official website

The Big Cypress Reservation is one of the six Indian reservations of the Seminole Tribe of Florida. It is located in southeastern Hendry County and northwestern Broward County, in southern Florida, United States. Its location is on the Atlantic coastal plain. This reservation lies south of Lake Okeechobee and just north of Alligator Alley. It is governed by the Seminole Tribe of Florida's Tribal Council, and is the largest of the five Seminole reservations in the state. Facilities on the reservation include the tribal museum and a major entertainment and rodeo complex.

The land area is 81.972 sq mi (212.306 km^{2}), including the 12th-largest cattle operation in the country. A resident population of 591 persons was reported in the 2010 census. The reservation is also called Big Cypress Seminole Indian Reservation or Big Cypress Indian Reservation. It lies adjacent to the north side of the largest section of the Miccosukee Indian Reservation in western Broward County.

== Climate ==
Climate data for Big Cypress, Florida, 1991–2020 normals, extremes 2002–present
Month	Jan	Feb	Mar	Apr	May	Jun	Jul	Aug	Sep	Oct	Nov	Dec	Year
Record high °F (°C)	89 (32)	93 (34)	95 (35)	99 (37)	97 (36)	99 (37)	99 (37)	99 (37)	97 (36)	97 (36)	93 (34)	89 (32)	99 (37)
Mean maximum °F (°C)	84.8 (29.3)	87.6 (30.9)	89.7 (32.1)	93.7 (34.3)	95.3 (35.2)	97.1 (36.2)	96.7 (35.9)	96.9 (36.1)	95.1 (35.1)	92.3 (33.5)	88.1 (31.2)	85.7 (29.8)	97.8 (36.6)
Mean daily maximum °F (°C)	74.5 (23.6)	77.8 (25.4)	80.9 (27.2)	85.4 (29.7)	89.1 (31.7)	91.2 (32.9)	92.3 (33.5)	92.0 (33.3)	90.0 (32.2)	86.2 (30.1)	80.6 (27.0)	76.7 (24.8)	84.7 (29.3)
Daily mean °F (°C)	63.3 (17.4)	66.1 (18.9)	68.8 (20.4)	73.0 (22.8)	77.5 (25.3)	81.3 (27.4)	82.6 (28.1)	82.9 (28.3)	81.4 (27.4)	77.1 (25.1)	70.5 (21.4)	66.1 (18.9)	74.2 (23.4)
Mean daily minimum °F (°C)	52.0 (11.1)	54.5 (12.5)	56.7 (13.7)	60.5 (15.8)	65.9 (18.8)	71.3 (21.8)	72.9 (22.7)	73.8 (23.2)	72.8 (22.7)	67.9 (19.9)	60.5 (15.8)	55.4 (13.0)	63.7 (17.6)
Mean minimum °F (°C)	35.0 (1.7)	38.3 (3.5)	41.2 (5.1)	48.6 (9.2)	56.8 (13.8)	66.9 (19.4)	69.5 (20.8)	71.1 (21.7)	69.3 (20.7)	56.3 (13.5)	45.1 (7.3)	41.8 (5.4)	32.9 (0.5)
Record low °F (°C)	27 (−3)	31 (−1)	34 (1)	42 (6)	50 (10)	57 (14)	65 (18)	69 (21)	63 (17)	44 (7)	38 (3)	27 (−3)	27 (−3)
Average precipitation inches (mm)	2.63 (67)	2.32 (59)	2.82 (72)	2.88 (73)	5.09 (129)	10.09 (256)	8.79 (223)	9.08 (231)	6.73 (171)	3.56 (90)	2.08 (53)	1.90 (48)	57.97 (1,472)
Average precipitation days (≥ 0.01 in)	5.5	6.0	5.4	5.6	9.1	17.3	17.4	18.6	16.5	9.4	6.1	7.0	123.9
Source: NOAA (mean maxima/minima 2006–2020)

== Tourism and entertainment ==
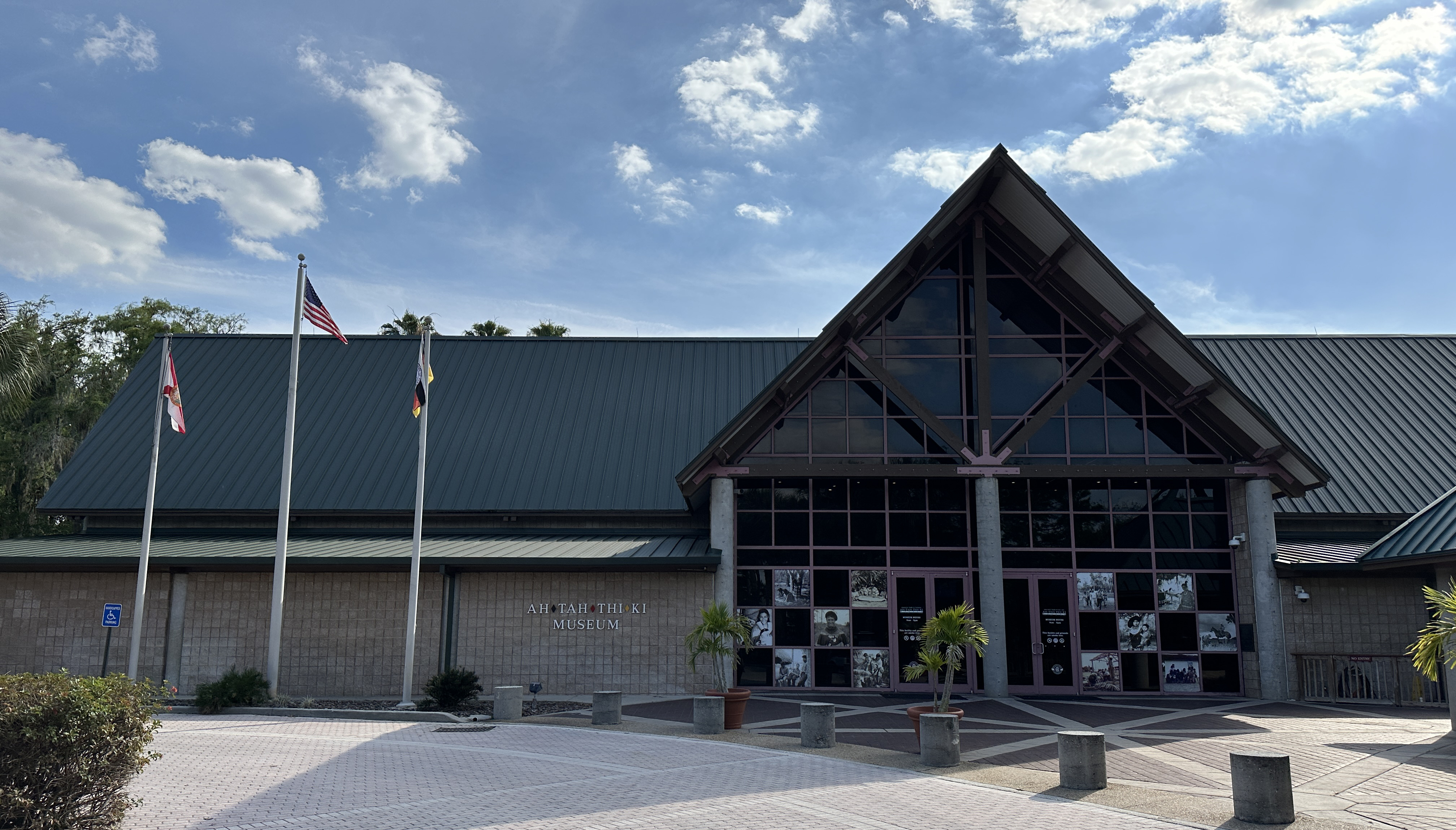
Ah-Tah-Thi-Ki Museum

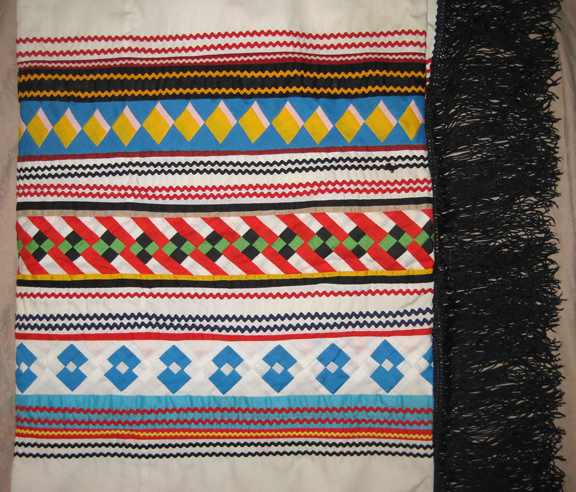
Seminole patchwork shawl made by Susie Cypress from Big Cypress Indian Reservation, ca. 1980s

Big Cypress National Preserve is adjacent to the reservation.

The American rock band Phish held their millennium concert at the reservation from December 30, 1999, to January 1, 2000. With 85,000 people in attendance, it was the earliest and largest sold-out millennium concert. Phish performed three sets of music on the 30th, an afternoon set on the 31st, and an unprecedented "Midnight To Dawn" set, which ran from 11:50pm until sunrise on January 1, 2000.

The entertainment complex is surrounded by 350 acres for outdoor events, in addition to a newly renovated rodeo arena with seating for 3,000 people. Stables have stalls for 86 horses.

The tribe constructed the Ah-Tah-Thi-Ki Seminole Indian Museum, which opened in 1997. In 2005 it was the first tribal museum to receive accreditation from the American Association of Museums (AAM), and is a Smithsonian Institution Affiliate.

== Education ==
The tribal school, affiliated with the Bureau of Indian Education, is the Ahfachkee School.

For residents of Hendry County, the local school district is Hendry County School District.

For residents of Broward County, the local school district is Broward County School District.
