= Hitchiti =

Indigenous people along the Chattahoochee River

Hecete (Creek)

Total population
- Extinct as a tribe

Regions with significant populations
- Georgia, United States

Languages
- Hitchiti

Religion
- Traditional tribal religion

Related ethnic groups
- Muscogee, Mikasuki, Seminole

Hitchiti (/hɪ.ˈtʃɪ.ti/, hih-CHIH-tee; Creek: Hecete) was a tribal town in what is now the Southeast United States. It was one of several towns whose people spoke the Hitchiti language. It was first known as part of the Apalachicola Province, an association of tribal towns along the Chattahoochee River. Shortly after 1690, the towns of Apalachicola Province moved to the central part of present-day Georgia, with Hitchiti joining most of those towns along Ochese Creek (now named the Ocmulgee River). In 1715, most of the towns on Ochese Creek, including Hitchiti, moved back to the Chattahoochee River, where the town remained until its people were forced to move to Indian Territory as part of the Trail of Tears.

== Name ==
The Spanish recorded the name of the town as "Achito", "Ahachito", "Euchitto", and, possibly, "Ayfitichi", while it was known to the English as "Echete", "Echeetes", and "Hitchiti". According to Gatschet and Swanton, "Hitchiti" was derived from Atcik-ha′ta or Ahi′tcita. Hitchiti was only one of several tribal towns whose members primarily spoke the Hitchiti language. Other Hitchiti-speaking towns included Apalachicola, Oconee, Osuchi, and Ocmulque, and possibly Chiacahuti, Talipaste, Ylapi, Tacusa, and Sabacola. The people of those towns were collectively referred to as "Hitchiti".

== Early history ==
The tribal town of Hitchiti first appeared in Spanish reports (as Ahachito) in 1675 as part of the Apalachicola Province along the Chattahoochee River. In the first half of the 17th century, a number of towns were situated along 160 kilometres (100 mi) of the Chattahoochee River in Alabama and Georgia, from the south of the falls at present-day Columbus to Barbour County, Alabama. Archaeological evidence indicates that the material culture of the 17th century lower Chattahoochee region had developed in place over several centuries. The ancestors of at least some of the people in the area may have been there as early as 12,000 years ago. A variant of the Lamar regional culture, with influences from the Fort Walton culture to the south, developed in the towns along the Chattahoochee between 1300 and 1400.

A major change in ceramic types at sites along the Chattahoochee occurred between 1550 and 1650. There is also evidence of a large drop in the population in the area. The de Soto expedition in the 1540s did not enter the Chattahoochee Valley, but appears to have caused many deaths there due to epidemics of European and African diseases introduced by the Spaniards. Some archaeologists state that only two population centers survived along the Chattahoochee in the late 16th century, situated on opposite sides of the river south of the falls at Columbus. Both sites had large platform mounds, and may have served as ceremonial centers. While some archaeologists believe that some sites along the Chattahoochee remained stable population centers, and became sites of later population expansion, other archaeologists believe that there were significant influxes of other people into the Chattahoochee Valley, changing the material culture of the area.

Muscogee language-speaking people from the Coosa and Tallapoosa areas in Alabama may have moved into the Chattahoochee valley during the middle part of the 17th century. Folklore of the Lower Towns of the Muscogee Confederacy supports an interpretation of Muscogee-speaking immigrants joining a Hitchiti-speaking resident population, with the Chattahoochee River area including both Hitchiti- and Muscogee-speaking towns by the later 16th century. Speakers of the Koasati language, Apalachee people, and people known as Chisca or Yuchi also settled in the Chattahoochee towns in the later 17th century.

John Worth placed the town of Hitchiti on the eastern (Georgia) side of the Chattahoochee River in the late 17th century, possibly at archaeological site 9Ce1 (Note: Under the Smithsonian trinomial system for indexing archaeological sites, the first numeral indicates the state, in this case, Georgia, while the following two letters indicate the county, in this case, Chattahoochee County.) in Chattahoochee County, Georgia. That site was just south of the Muscogee-speaking towns of Coweta, Cusseta, and Kolomi.

== On Ochese Creek ==
Late in the 17th century all of the towns on the Chattahoochee River moved to central Georgia, primarily to what the English then called Ochese Creek, now called the Ocmulgee River. One map from 1715 showed a town with the name "Ewches" near present-day Macon, Georgia. Another map showed a town called "Echeetes" in the same area. "Ewches" may have been a mis-transcription of "Ochisi", (Note: Ichisi was a town in the Ocute chiefdom when the de Soto Expedition passed through the area. The Spanish referred to some of the people living in central Georgia as "Uchisi".) "Yuchi", or "Echeetes", but "Echeetes" is understood to be "Hitchiti". Worth identifies "Ewches" with archaeological site 9Bi22, and "Echeetes" with the cluster of sites 9Bi7, 9Bi8, and 9Bi9, all in Bibb County, Georgia. After the Yemassee War in 1715, almost all of the towns formerly from Apalachicola Province moved back to the Chattahoochee River.

== Return to Chattahoochee River ==
Hitchiti was one of the towns of the old Apalachicola Province that returned to the Chattahoochee River after the Yemassee War. Diego Peña traveled to the towns on the Chattahoochee River in 1716 on a mission from the governor of Spanish Florida. He reported Achito (Hitchiti) to be located between the towns of Apalachicola and Okmulgue, and to have 54 "warriors". Two leaders from the town of Hitchiti were among the Muscogee Confederacy chiefs who met Georgia Governor James Oglethorpe in Savannah in 1733. The next year, in 1734, Ysques, casique of Achito (Hitchiti), together with the casiques of Coweto, Cussetta and Apalachicola, traveled to St. Augustine to explore the revival of an alliance with the Spanish. The town of Hitchiti may have moved to different sites along the Chattahoochee River after 1715. Site 1Ru70, in Russell County, Alabama, may have been occupied by people of Hitchiti in the 1740s.

Benjamin Hawkins, United States Indian agent assigned to the Muscogee (Creek) Confederacy, visited the Hitchiti in 1799. Hawkins noted that the town of Hitchiti possessed "a narrow strip of good land" bordering on the river approximately four miles south of Chiaha (Chehaw). Hawkins reported that the people of Hitchiti were poor and "indolent", but friendly to whites. He also reported that there had been no substantiated charges of horse-stealing made against them. On the other hand, Gatschet reported that the Hitchiti had a reputation of being honest and industrious.

Hawkins found "Hitchetee" on the Chattahoochee River between "Paláchoocle" (Apalachicola) to the south and "Ceauhau" (Chiahah) to the north with Oseoochee just to the north of it. Archaeological site 9Sw50 (in Stewart County, Georgia) is named "Hitchiti". It is "an extensive village midden" on the east side of the Chattahoochee near the mouth of Hitchitee Creek, which has been identified as the site of Hitchiti in the later 18th century. Site 9Ce59 (in Chattahoochee County, Georgia) is a possible satellite settlement across Hitchitee Creek from the main Hitchiti site.

At the end of the 18th century, Hitchiti had several satellite settlements (talofas), including Hitcheetoochee (Little Hitchiti), located on the Flint River, and Tuttallosee (Fowltown), located on the headwaters of Tuttalloseehatchee (Fowltown Creek), about 20 miles west of Hitcheetoochee. Tuttallosee, with a population of about 50 circa 1800, had recently built its own square ground, possibly indicating that it was becoming a tribal town separate from Hitchiti. Cheauhoochee, about ten miles south of Hitchiti on Ihagi Creek west of the Chattahoochee River may also have been a satellite settlement of Hitchiti. (Note: Cheauhoochee was associated with Cheauhau (Chiaha) 1-1/2 miles west of Hitchiti on Auhegee creek, which was known as Hitchiti Creek at its juncture with the Chattahooche, and is now named Ihagee Creek. The Cottonton archaeological site (1Ru69) 0.9 west of that location might be associated with Cheauhoochee.) Swanton also listed Hihaje as a satellite settlement of Hitchiti, but did not identify a location.

== Population ==
Records of the population of the Hitchiti are scarce. Estimates provided by Swanton are that in 1738 there were 60 males in the tribal town; in 1750 only 15; 50 in 1760; 40 in 1761; and 90 in 1772. Sixty years later, in 1832, the entire population, males and females, was estimated at 381.

A census of the towns of the Muscogee (Creek) Confederacy, known as the Parsons and Abbott Roll, was taken in 1833. The towns of Hitchiti and Hihaje are listed in that census.

In 1937, the tribal town of "Hichiti", located northeast of Henryetta, Oklahoma was reported to no longer be maintaining a sacred fire. The former members of Hichiti became associated with the tribal town of Kasihta, which still maintained a square ground near Okmulgee, Oklahoma. Hitchita, Oklahoma is named after Hichiti.

== Sources ==
- Bolton, Herbert Eugene (1964). Bannon, John Francis (ed.). Bolton and the Spanish Borderlands. University of Oklahoma Press. p. 138. ISBN 0-8061-0612-3.
- Ethridge, Robbie (2003). Creek Country: The Creek Indians and Their World. Chapel Hill, North Carolina: The University of North Carolina Press. ISBN 0-8078-2827-0.
- Foster, H. Thomas II (2007). Archaeology of the Lower Muskogee Creek Indians, 1715-1836. The University of Alabama Press. ISBN 978-0-8173-1239-8.
- Gatschet, Albert (1884). A Migration Legend of the Creek Indians. Philadelphia: D. G. Brinton – via Internet Archive.
- Hahn, Steven C. (2004). The Invention of the Creek Nation, 1670–1763. University of Nebraska Press. ISBN 0-8032-2414-1.
- Hann, John H. (2006). The Native American World Beyond Apalachee. University Press of Florida. ISBN 978-0-8130-2982-5.
- Hill, James L. (2022). Creek Internationalism in an Age of Revolution, 1763–1818 (Hardback ed.). University of Nebraska Press. ISBN 978-1-49621518-5.
- Knight, Vernon James Jr.; Mistovich, Tim S. (August 31, 1984), Walter F. George Lake Archeological Survey of Fee Owned Lands Alabama and Georgia (Report to U.S. Army Corps of Engineers), Report of Investigations 42, Office of Archaeological Research, pp. 111–112
- Worth, John E. (2000). "The Lower Creeks: Origin and History" (PDF). In McEwan (ed.). Indians of the Greater Southeast: Historical Archaeology and Ethnohistory (Bonnie G. ed.). University of Florida Press. pp. 265–298. ISBN 9-780-8130-2086-0.
- Swanton, John R. (2003) [1952]. The Indian Tribes of North America. Smithsonian Institution Bureau of American Ethnology Bulletin. Vol. 145 (Reprint ed.). Genealogical Publishing Company. ISBN 978-0-8063-1730-4.
