= Buffalo Tiger =

William Buffalo Tiger (Heenehatche; March 6, 1920 – January 6, 2015 in Kendall, Florida) was a political leader of the Miccosukee Nation based in the Everglades area of Florida. He served as the first elected tribal chairman from 1962 to 1985, and before that was head of the General Council from 1957 and a chief. His activism led to political organization of the Miccosukee and their gaining federal recognition in 1962 as an independent Native American tribe. They wrote a constitution to govern their people.

In 1959 Buffalo Tiger led a delegation to Cuba and secured formal diplomatic recognition from the government of Fidel Castro of the Miccosukee. In 1962 the US Government recognized the tribe. Under his leadership, the tribe in 1971 was the first to take over responsibility to operate its social and educational programs, as was later encouraged by the Indian Self-Determination Act of 1975. Buffalo Tiger and the tribe have used their sovereignty to preserve their culture and traditions in their homeland.

With historian Harry A. Kersey, he wrote an autobiography, Buffalo Tiger: A Life in the Everglades (2008). From the late 1980s he ran an airboat tour company in the Florida Everglades.

== Early life and education ==
William Buffalo Tiger was born Heenehatche in 1920 to Tiger Tiger and his wife in a traditional Miccosukee village in the Florida Everglades. They lived in a "chickee," a house built raised from ground level. As a member of the Miccosukee his first language was Mikasuki, one of the Muskogee languages. He grew up immersed in the traditional customs of the people. In the early 20th century, the Miccosukee were considered part of the Seminole, and the people maintained their relative isolation from the majority community by living within the Everglades.

When the Tamiami Trail was built through the Everglades in the 1920s and 1930s, it cut through Seminole and Miccosukee land. The road brought tourism to the region, which provided some jobs and a market for Miccosukee crafts, but also encroached on their culture. Many of the Seminole lived closer to European-American settlements and adapted more to the majority culture. In the 1940s, the Seminole began to move into designated Indian reservations, but the Miccosukee stayed outside.

== Chief of Miccosukee ==
In the 1950s, the Seminole were faced with new challenges; in 1953 the federal government proposed to terminate them as a tribe, which meant a reduction in certain benefits and, more tragically, neglect from the United States to honor their sovereignty.

The majority of Seminole in Florida organized to gather their political power, and in 1957 were federally recognized as the Seminole Tribe of Florida. The process of gaining such recognition had pointed up cultural differences between the groups. Another dividing issue was making claims in the 1950s for land taken by the federal government in the 19th century; the Seminole of Oklahoma and Florida wanted to gain compensation for lands lost, but the Miccosukee and Traditionals did not want to give up their claim to have the land returned.

At this time, the Seminole and Miccosukee formally separated. Led by Buffalo Tiger, the Miccosukee gained state recognition separately in 1957, and federal recognition in 1962. The Traditionals or Independents did not affiliate with either tribe.

The Miccosukee preserved their more traditional ways and kept some distance from the majority culture. As a young man working as a housepainter, Buffalo Tiger had learned English. He began to represent his tribe in dealings with the European Americans. The modern world encroached on the Miccosukee and the Everglades, areas of which were developed, and he became an energetic and outspoken leader of the community.

Buffalo Tiger was chief of the Miccosukee in 1957; he was elected as the first tribal chairman after its adoption of a constitution, and served as chairman for decades. To create publicity about the tribe's effort to gain federal recognition, in 1959 Buffalo Tiger requested recognition of the Miccosukee from several nations; only Cuba responded. He, Homer Osceola of the tribal council, and Morton Silver traveled to Cuba in 1959 and met with premier Fidel Castro of the new revolutionary government.

He worked with state and federal officials to implement reforms and to protect the community’s cultural and natural resources. Under Chief Buffalo Tiger's leadership, in May 1971 the Miccosukee signed a contract with the federal Bureau of Indian Affairs to take over operation of the "comprehensive social and educational programs formerly run by agency bureaucrats. He had worked closely with the tribe's attorney, S. Bobo Dean, who represented it in negotiations in Washington, DC. The Miccosukee were the first tribe to take such control, taking advantage of President Richard M. Nixon's 1970 initiative of Indian self-determination prior to passage of legislation in 1975 to support this.

Their several parcels of lands are known collectively as the Miccosukee Indian Reservation. Under a separate lease arrangement with the state water conservation district achieved in 1983, they have access and fishing and hunting rights in 200,000 acres of wetlands.

Chief Buffalo Tiger served on the Florida Governor's Council on Indian Affairs, established in 1974 as an advisory body to the state's chief executive. He and the chief of the Seminole served as co-chairs of the group, two-thirds of whose members were appointed by the two federally recognized tribes in the state.

Buffalo Tiger helped bring modernity to his people, including control of their programs, economic development, and improvements to medicine and education. At the same time, Buffalo Tiger supported efforts to preserve the culture; the Miccosukee Indian Village Museum was founded in 1983. He was opposed by some traditionalists because of failure to gain more land under tribal control and finally voted out of office in 1985.

== Later years ==
Since the late 1980s, Buffalo Tiger developed a business to take tourists on airboats through the Everglades. He used these occasions to educate people about the total ecology of the area and build support for its preservation, such as a planned airport. He opposed the construction of I-75 through the Everglades, a major freeway which was completed in 1993. He had developed a tourist business, Buffalo Tiger's Airboat Tour, for the Everglades. Family members took over operation of the business in the 21st century.

== Personal life ==
Buffalo Tiger was married three times, each time to a non-Miccosukee woman. He lived in Miami. Among his five children are two sons from his first marriage, both of whom are active as Miccosukee. One has worked as an engineer with General Motors in Detroit, and Stephen Tiger has led a rock group, Tiger Tiger, which has released several CDs.

== Legacy and honors ==
- His autobiography, Buffalo Tiger: A Life in the Everglades (2008), written with historian Harry A. Kersey, Jr., won the Samuel Proctor Oral History Award and the James J. Horgan Book Award.
