= Isabel Aretz =

Argentine–Venezuelan researcher, writer, ethnomusicologist and composer (1909–2005)

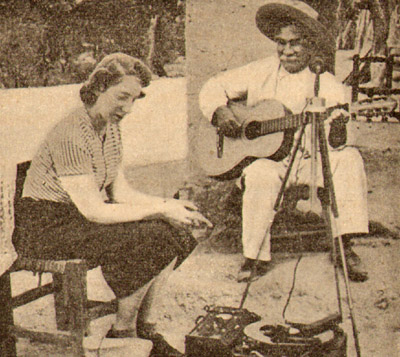
Isabel Aretz

Isabel Aretz (14 April 1909 – 2 June 2005) was an Argentine–Venezuelan researcher, writer, ethnomusicologist and composer.

== Early years ==
Isabel Aretz was born in Buenos Aires. She was educated at the National Conservatory of Music and Performing Arts, studying pedagogy, piano with Rafael González and harmony, counterpoint and composition with Althos Palma. She earned a doctorate in music from the Catholic University of Argentina in 1968.

== Career ==
After completing her initial studies, Aretz became a senior lecturer at the National Conservatory and began work as an ethnomusic researcher and composer. In 1937 her orchestral work Punto premiered at the Teatro Cervantes. In the next decade, she collected and recorded traditional music, traveling in Argentina, Paraguay, Uruguay, Chile, Bolivia and Peru. In 1947 she married Venezuelan musician and writer Luis Felipe Ramón y Rivera.

She was asked that same year to organize the music section of the Folklore Research Service established in Venezuela, and she continued her research on folk music there. The Escuela Nacional de Danzas de Argentina appointed her a professor of ethnomusicology in 1950. She was the first person at the school to hold the position.

In 1966 she was awarded a Guggenheim Fellowship to record native melodies in Mexico, Colombia, Ecuador and Central America.

Aretz founded the American Institute of Ethnomusicology and Folklore (INIDEF) in Venezuela and chaired the institution from 1990 and 1995. She became a professor of ethnomusicology at the School of Arts, Central University of Venezuela, and at Indiana University in the United States. She was also a guest lecturer at other universities in Mexico and Colombia.

Aretz published a number of journal articles and about twenty-five books on American folklore, plus an autobiography. After her husband died in 1992, she was appointed a member of the Academy of Arts and Sciences in Argentina, and she returned to San Isidro to live and work until her death in June 2005.

== Awards and honors ==
- Order of Andrés Bello of the Government of Venezuela
- Premio Nacional de Música "José Angel Lamas"
- First Prize for Musicology by the National Endowment for the Arts
- Emeritus, Argentina Academy of Music in 1999
- Master Teacher, Catholic University of Valparaiso in 2000
- Gabriela Mistral International Prize of Arts and Music, awarded by the Organization of American States (OAS), Washington, USA
- Robert Stevenson International Musicological Award for research in ethnomusicology, Washington, USA

== Works ==
Aretz composed works for orchestra, symphonies, symphonic plays and choral works, and piano and harpsichord suites. Selected works include:

- Puneñas, premiered at the Teatro Cervantes in Buenos Aires.
- Páramo, ballet premiered at the Aula Magna of the Universidad Central de Venezuela.
- Jew's harp, premiered at the International Festival of Mérida, Venezuela.
- Yekuana, premiered at the Aula Magna of the Universidad Central de Venezuela.
- Argentina to death, orchestra work after a poem by César Fernández Moreno, premiered at the Teatro Humboldt, Caracas.
- Kwaltaya, ethnodrama premiered at the Teatro Municipal, Caracas, Venezuela.
- Constellation spectral, symphony premiered by the Orquesta Sinfónica Municipal.
- Father Liberator, symphonic and choral work, premiered at the American Music Festival at the John F. Center Kennedy Center for the Performing Arts in Washington.
- Cries of a city released in Concert Mark May, New York.
- Cosmos man works for piano and tape released in Christ and St. Stephen's Church in New York.
