= Casique =

Casique is a surname. Notable people with the surname include:

- Joel Casique (1958–2010), Venezuelan artist
- Pedro Casique (born 2001), Peruvian footballer
