= Useche =

Useche is a surname. Notable people with the surname include:

- Andrés Useche (born 1977), Colombian American writer, film director, graphic artist, singer-songwriter, and activist
- Delmán Useche (born 1950), Venezuelan footballer
- Marco Antonio Rivera Useche (1895–1990), Venezuelan musician and composer
