= Miccosukee =

Native American tribe in Florida, U.S.

Miccosukee Tribe of Indians
Mikisúki

Total population
- 640 enrolled citizens

Regions with significant populations
- Florida, U.S.

Languages
- Mikasuki, English

Religion
- Indigenous religion, Christianity

Related ethnic groups
- Seminole (Seminole Nation of Oklahoma and Seminole Tribe of Florida), Muscogee Nation

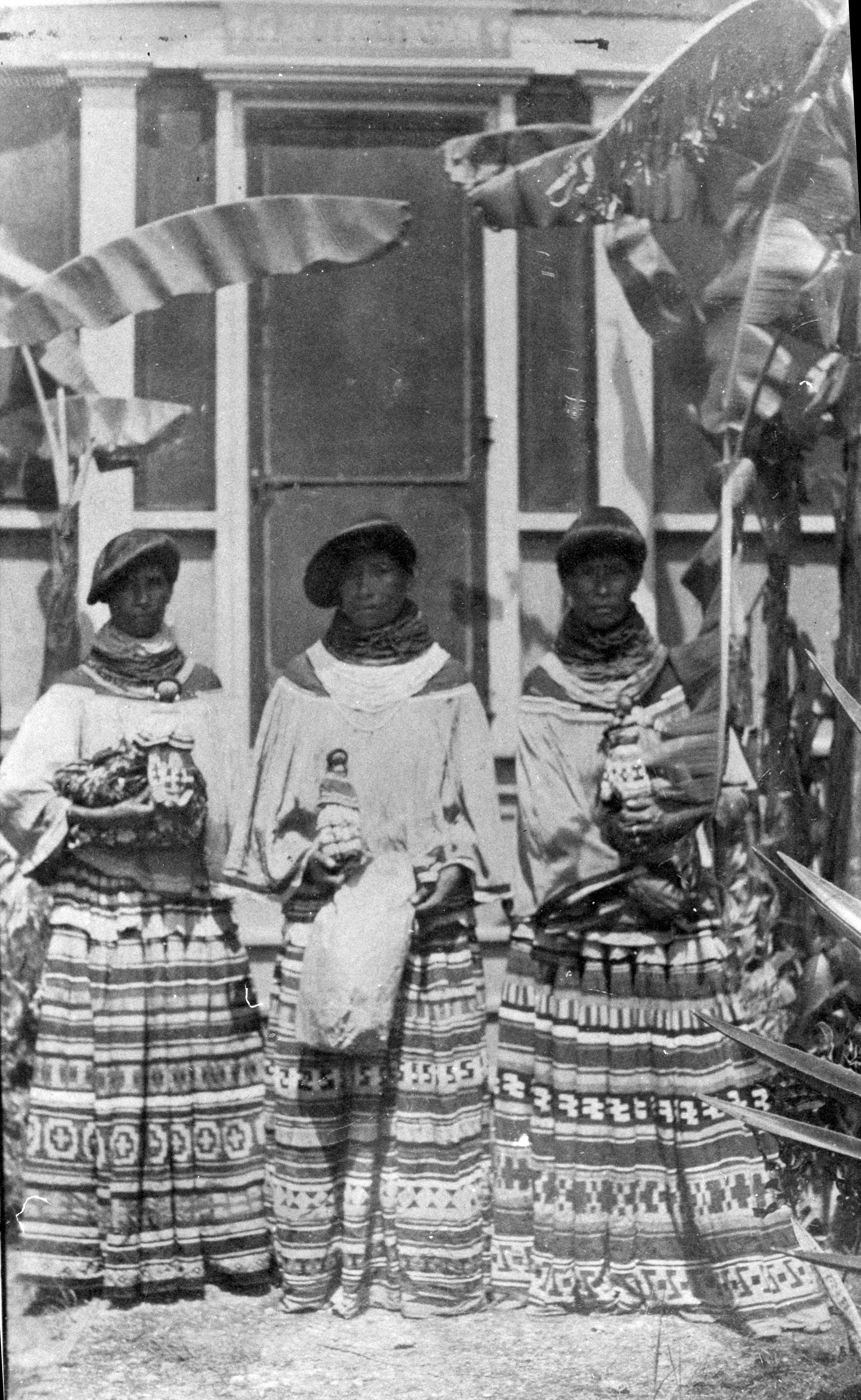
Miccosukee sisters in Everglades City, Florida in 1945

The Miccosukee Tribe of Indians (/ˌmɪkəˈsuki/, MIH-kə-SOO-kee; autonym: Mikisúki) is a federally recognized Native American tribe in the U.S. state of Florida. They are Indigenous peoples of the Southeastern Woodlands and related to the Seminole Tribe of Florida, the Seminole Nation of Oklahoma, and the Muscogee Nation.

The Miccosukee, along with the Florida Seminole, speak the Mikasuki language, also spelled Miccosukee. The language has been referred to as a descendant of Hitchiti, (Note: Pronounced /ˈhɪʧəˌti/.) a dialect of Hitchiti, and as another term for Hitchiti.

By the late 18th century, the British recorded the name Miccosukee, or Mikasuki, as designating a Hitchiti-speaking group centered on the town of Miccosukee, a tribal town affiliated with the Creek Confederacy. The town spanned sections of present-day Alabama, South Georgia, and North Florida. Under pressure from European encroachment into their territory during the 18th century, the Miccosukee underwent a period of increasingly frequent migration to Spanish Florida.

The Miccosukee were displaced during the Seminole Wars (1817–1858), a series of three military conflicts between the United States and the Seminole people. During this period, many Seminoles were forced to relocate west of the Mississippi River to Indian Territory, forming the Seminole Nation of Oklahoma. A group of 200 or fewer Seminoles would stay in Florida.

Descendants of those who remained in Florida were concentrated in the central and southern parts of the state. In the 1920s and 1930s, many Miccosukee established communities along the Tamiami Trail, a roadway completed in 1928 that ran through the Everglades and connected the cities of Tampa and Miami. The Trail Indians, as they were called, generally kept more traditional practices. They were less interested in establishing formal relations with the federal government than the Cow Creek Seminoles to the north, who started moving to reservations around the same time.

In 1953, the Florida Seminoles were identified for termination of federal status. The Seminole Tribe of Florida organized and gained federal recognition in 1957. Due to political differences, the Miccosukee formed a separate group and gained federal recognition in 1962. The Traditionals, or Independents, are Indians living in Florida who are unaffiliated with either tribe. The Traditionals predominantly live in Big Cypress Swamp.

== History ==
The Miccosukees were a group that moved between present-day Georgia and North Florida, with an extended range for hunting, fishing, and trading expeditions stretching from the Appalachian Mountains to the Florida Keys. By the late 18th century, Miccosukee-speaking villages had been built in the Everglades. According to scholarship published in collaboration with tribal elders, multiple groups of Indians joined together to form the core group that became the Miccosukee Tribe in northern Florida; these groups included elements of the Oconee, Hitchiti, Eufala, and Appalachicola tribal towns in southern Georgia and northern Florida.

=== 19th century ===
Under continuing encroachment from European, and later, American, settlers, many Miccosukee ancestors from different locations found themselves in North Florida by the early 18th century.

The Miccosukee broke from the Muscogee Confederacy in Northern Florida after the First Seminole War of 1817 and 1818.

In 1765, a group of Native Americans in Florida known as the "Alatchaway" (Alachua), a Muscogee-speaking group led by Cowkeeper (Ahaya) that was a precursor of the modern Florida Seminoles, rejected a meeting between the British and the Creeks at Picolata, the site of a Spanish fort about 13 miles west of St. Augustine in northeastern Florida. Cowkeeper and his band of Indians negotiated their own agreement with the British in a separate meeting. The spring of 1787 marked the first time that a group specifically known as Seminoles attended the Lower Creeks' annual meeting. In the 1796 Treaty of Colerain, the Creek Confederacy agreed that all Creeks in Georgia and Florida would return runaway slaves to their white American owners, an agreement that the Native Americans in Florida disputed because the Creeks did not speak for those living in Florida. Prior to 1812, the Creek national council was denying treaty annuities to the Tribes in Florida.

The Indigenous people in Florida were had separated from the Muscogee by 1818 at the latest, following Andrew Jackson's invasion of Florida. The Miccosukees eventually joined with the Seminoles in defending their Florida homeland against encroaching white settlers during the 1820s. Despite the need for such an informal alliance, the Miccosukees maintained their separate identity within the tribes of Florida. During this time, the U.S. government and white settlers in Florida often viewed the Miccosukee Indians and the Seminole Indians as a single entity. About 2,000 Upper Creeks, known as Red Sticks, militant Muscogee-speaking Indians, joined the tribes in Florida after being defeated in the Creek War of 1813-1814.

By the late 1830s, the dominant Indigenous language spoken in Florida was Mikasuki or other variants of Hitchiti. Muscogee was the dominant language within the Creek Confederacy, but Hitchiti had traveled with those who settled permanently in Florida and became the primary tongue, despite Muscogee often serving as the lingua franca throughout present-day Florida, Georgia, and Alabama whenever Indigenous people interacted with white people. For a time during the 19th century, the Miccosukee were part of the developing Seminole identity in Florida. This identity formed in the early 19th century in Florida through a process of ethnogenesis. The Miccosukees and the Seminoles, however, not only continued to see themselves as separate entities within Florida but also saw themselves as wholly separate from the Creek Confederacy that continued to negotiate with Europeans and claimed influence over Alabama, Georgia, and North Florida.

Following this influx of people in the early 19th century, documented Indians in Florida numbered about 5,000. This entry of Muscogee-speaking Indians into Florida had the additional effect of pushing many Hitchiti-speaking (Miccosukee) people farther south.

As early as 1827, and possibly earlier, Mikasuki-speaking Native Americans had a permanent presence in the Everglades.

Although East and West Florida were under Spanish control at this time (1783-1821), U.S. forces under Andrew Jackson invaded Florida in 1817 under the pretext of retaliation for Indian raids against settlers in Georgia. The true reasons for invasion included pursuit of runaway slaves and the realization that Spain was too politically and militarily weak to protect Florida. In addition to the destruction of Negro Fort on the Apalachicola River by American forces in 1816, these events were the initial conflicts in the First Seminole War.

Florida became a U.S. territory in 1821, and the American government soon increased pressure for removal against all Indians living in Florida. This was the period of numerous treaties between the U.S. and various bands of Indians living in Florida as white settlers increasingly pushed for more available land, and the government in Washington, D.C. sought to support those who wished to take advantage of settling the new territory. Treaties such as the Treaty of Moultrie Creek (1823) and the Treaty of Payne's Landing (1833) were agreements that attempted to aggregate the Native Americans in Florida into isolated tracts of land, first in central Florida, and later in southwestern and southeastern Florida. Despite the appearance of numerous agreements between the tribes of Florida and the U.S. government, these negotiations were never balanced between the parties involved because of the presence of the U.S. military at these negotiations and difficulties in translation and understanding. There also was never true representation of all of the Native Americans in Florida because the groups of men who represented the Indians during treaty negotiations did not represent all of the bands living in Florida at that time.

Following the Indian Removal Act of 1830, the U.S. relocated several thousand Seminole and hundreds of Black Seminoles, who lived in close association as allies, west to the Indian Territory (present-day Oklahoma). The U.S. government still believed that the Florida Seminoles were a part of the Creek Confederacy, and the American agents involved in relocation attempted to place the Florida Indians with land under the Creek administration. Eventually, the Florida Seminoles in Oklahoma gained their own reservation and federal recognition as the Seminole Nation of Oklahoma.

Those who remained in Florida fought against U.S. forces during the second and third Seminole Wars. Both of these conflicts resulted in groups of Indians being relocated to Indian Territory. The Second Seminole War began in 1835 after the Indians of Florida retaliated for repeated abuses by white settlers in Florida, including theft, violence, and illegal entry into Indian lands. One of the longest, most expensive, and most deadly conflicts between Native Americans and the U.S. military, the Second Seminole War is a nearly forgotten conflict that had an extraordinary impact on southeastern U.S. history, American military tactics, and modern development of the U.S. Navy. The Indians of Florida conducted a guerrilla-style war against a numerically superior and technologically advanced enemy. The result of the war was many more Indigenous people dead or deported but a U.S. failure at complete removal of Indians from Florida. By 1842, perhaps 300 Native Americans remained in Florida; more than 4,000 were forcibly relocated to Indian Territory between 1835 and 1842. The Miccosukee chief Ar-pi-uck-i, also known as Sam Jones (Abiaki, Abiaka), proved an effective leader during the Second Seminole War; his strategy of hiding the tribe on tree islands, or hammocks, in the Big Cypress Swamp and the Everglades ensured that the ancestors of present-day Miccosukees and Seminoles remained in Florida.

The Third Seminole War began in 1855 after a small band of Indians led by Billy Bowlegs (Holatta Micco) attacked American encampments in response to repeated harassment and destruction of property by U.S. military forces. The result of this conflict was the removal of Billy Bowlegs's band for Oklahoma, having accepted a monetary settlement. The sole remaining Indians in Florida in 1858 were those sheltering in the swamp and wetlands in the south.

By 1858, perhaps 200 ancestors of the modern Miccosukee and Seminole Tribes remained in Florida. They survived by moving into central and southern Florida to take advantage of the topography of Big Cypress and the Everglades, which was largely unknown to the remainder of the U.S. The American Civil War during the 1860s meant that the U.S. let the Indigenous people in Florida live their lives as they saw fit as American military attention focused elsewhere.

=== 20th century ===
From the end of the Third Seminole War in 1858 until the 1920s, the Indigenous people in Florida lived their lives in Big Cypress and the Everglades, intentionally isolated from interactions with white Floridians except for the occasional meeting for trade. Groups of Native Americans tended to gather in bigger camps until 1900, and then they began to separate into smaller groups in the face of increased development in Central and South Florida. The isolation of camps in South Florida began to end in the late 1920s with the construction of the Tamiami Trail (U.S. 41).

Construction of the Tamiami Trail as the route between Tampa and Miami concluded in 1928. This brought new forms of traffic through Big Cypress and the Everglades. Not long before the completion of the Trail, Florida outlawed hunting for alligator and fur-bearing animals. With traffic in the region increasing, various drainage and canal projects throughout Florida changing the water levels around the tree islands, and declining opportunities for economic stability, Indians began to relocate to sites along the Trail. Over a dozen camps, or villages, moved closer to the Trail between 1928 and 1938. From these sites, Miccosukee people sought to improve their economic situation by offering airboat tours of the Everglades, Indigenous artworks for sale, and other goods and services to tourists traveling across the state. Still viewed by many as Seminole Indians during this time, the Miccosukees who moved to live along the Trail also became known as the Trail Indians.

The distinction between "Miccosukee" and "Seminole" began to grow as the former believed the latter were more willing to assimilate to the majority culture by moving onto designated Indian reservations in Florida starting in the 1930s and 1940s. The federal and state governments persisted in treating the Indians of Florida as a unified people, eventually including a third group, known as Independents or Traditionals, who did not affiliate with either the Miccosukee or the Seminole groups. One issue that further divided the tribes in Florida was a small group of Seminoles filing with the Indian Claims Commission in 1950 to claim compensation for lands taken by the U.S. government. Many of the Miccosukees contended that they never reached an official peace with the U.S., and they wanted their land returned rather than financial compensation. The U.S. settlement of the claims with the Miccosukee and Seminole of Florida, as well as the Seminole Nation of Oklahoma, finally concluded in 1976; division of shares among the tribes took until 1990 to settle.

Divisions between the Miccosukees and Seminoles peaked during the 1950s. Under the federal government's program of termination of recognition, it proposed terminating the U.S. recognition of the Florida Seminoles in 1953. The Miccosukee response was the Buckskin Declaration in 1954, which a Miccosukee delegation personally delivered to one of president Dwight D. Eisenhower's aides. The declaration stated that the Trail Indians wanted nothing from the U.S. government; the Indians only wanted to be able to live their lives on the land as they always had. Meanwhile, the reservation Indians in Florida became known as the Seminole Tribe of Florida after they developed a constitution and corporate charter to organize a government; they achieved federal recognition in 1957.

The land claims and termination controversies heightened the distinction for the Miccosukee living near the Tamiami Trail. Unable to gain similar federal recognition of their own right to sovereignty, a group of Miccosukees, led by the young councilmember Buffalo Tiger (Heenehatche), visited Cuba in July 1959 during the brand-new Castro regime's celebration of the 26th of July Movement in Havana. The nation congratulated Castro in his success in the Cuban revolution, and Castro responded by offering to “formally recognize” the Miccosukee as a sovereign nation. This strategy was successful for the Miccosukees, as the U.S. government began negotiations upon the group's return to Florida. The Trail Indians gained federal recognition of their sovereignty in 1962 as the Miccosukee Tribe of Indians of Florida. Buffalo Tiger became the first chairman of the Miccosukee Tribe, and he continued to lead as chairman of the Miccosukee Business Council until 1985.

The Miccosukee Tribe continued to pursue increased tribal sovereignty. On May 4, 1971, the Miccosukee Corporation assumed operational responsibility for all of the programs formerly administered by the Bureau of Indian Affairs. These programs included healthcare, law enforcement, and education, among others. The Miccosukee Tribe was the first Native American tribe in the U.S. to achieve this distinction by taking advantage of the Richard Nixon administration's stated preference in 1970 for self-determination among Indigenous tribes. This preference for self-determination was later enshrined as the Indian Self-Determination and Education Assistance Act of 1975.

=== 21st century ===
The tribe today occupies several reservations in southern Florida, collectively known as the Miccosukee Indian Reservations. The most populous area is known as the Miccosukee Reserved Area (MRA) or the Tamiami Trail Reservation, located about 40 miles (64 kilometers) west of Miami. The largest land section is an 87,000-acre (352 square kilometers) reservation on the northern border of Everglades National Park, known as the Alligator Alley Reservation, which includes 20,000 acres (81 square kilometers) of developable land, much of which the Miccosukee Tribe uses for a cattle grazing lease, and nearly 55,000 acres (223 square kilometers) of wetlands. The Miccosukee Tribe provides use permits for non-Natives to use some of the wetlands for hunting camps. The tribe also controls about 200,000 acres (810 square kilometers) of wetlands, most under a perpetual lease made in 1983 with the State of Florida and located in the South Florida Water Management District's Water Conservation Area 3A South. Miccosukees may use "this land for the purpose of hunting, fishing, frogging, and subsistence agriculture to carry on the traditional Miccosukee way of life."

In 1990, the tribe opened Miccosukee Indian Bingo & Gaming to generate revenue for tribal citizens and facilitate developing new opportunities for tribal citizens. Following the great success of the bingo hall, the tribe opened the 302-room Miccosukee Resort & Gaming Facility, now called the Miccosukee Casino & Resort, in 1999, which includes gaming facilities, entertainment venues, bingo, and numerous restaurants and other amenities. The revenue from this enterprise has supported economic development and improvements to education and welfare.

Most Miccosukees today reside in the modern housing on the MRA along a single road known as Old Tamiami Trail or an extension to the west known as Loop Road. Some tribal citizens live farther west along Tamiami Trail in traditional clan camps in Big Cypress, Fakahatchee Strand Preserve State Park, and Collier-Seminole State Park. Some Miccosukees live in suburban Miami. Old Tamiami Trail is the center of tribal activities in the 21st century, and it contains all of the essential needs for the tribe, including residences, the school, the police department, the health clinic, recreational amenities, and the tribe's administration building.

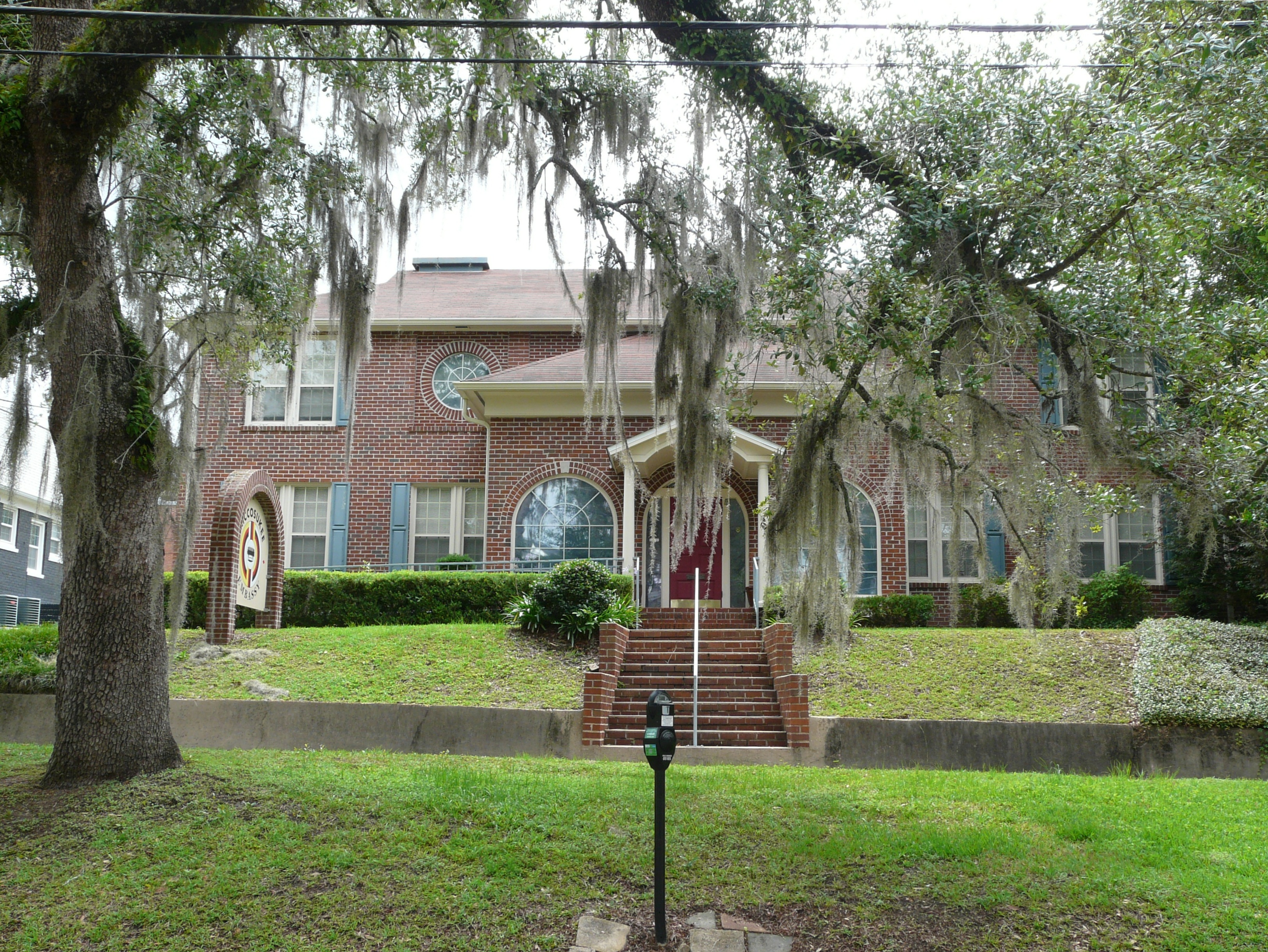
Miccosukee embassy in Tallahassee

In 2024, the Miccosukee tribe opened an embassy in the Florida state capital of Tallahassee, intending to help foster government-to-government communications and assist in representation of the tribe's interests in Florida governmental affairs.

== Citizenship ==
The 1962 Constitution of the Miccosukee Tribe of Indians of Florida initially emphasized admitting tribal citizens of at least half-Miccosukee ancestry.

The tribe has a matrilineal system of kinship and inheritance. Children are considered to be born into their mother's clan, from which they gain their status in the tribe. In this system, the mother's older brother is highly important in raising her children, more than the biological father, especially for boys. The uncle introduces the boys to the men's groups of the clan and tribe.

== Government ==
The Miccosukees have a written constitution, and all adult tribal citizens are part of the General Council, which manages the tribal services. The General Council elects officers to run the Business Council, which is led by a chairman. This system is "a combination of traditional tribal government and modern management." As of 2023, the current chairman is Talbert Cypress. The rest of the Business Council are Lucas K. Osceola, Kenneth H. Cypress, William J. Osceola, and Petties Osceola, Jr., serving respectively as Assistant Chairman, Treasurer, Secretary, and Lawmaker. Curtis E. Osceola serves the Tribe as the current chief of staff. Government administration is further divided into departments including Land Resources, Water Resources, and Fish & Wildlife.

The Miccosukee Tribe operates its own police and court system. It also has a clinic, day care center, senior center, and Community Action Agency. The tribe's educational system spans from a Head Start preschool program through senior high school. Adult, vocational, and higher education programs are also available.

== Business interests ==
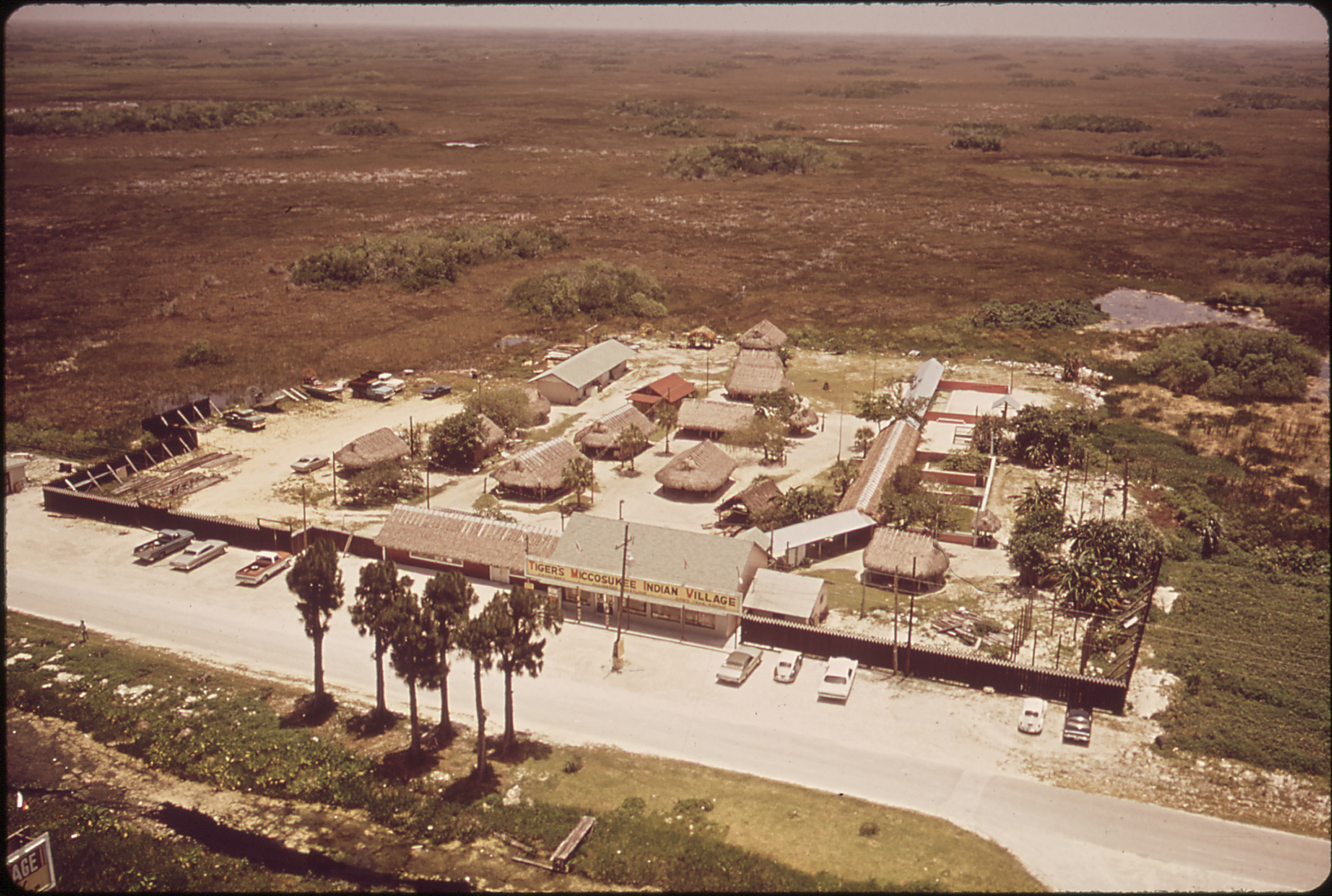
Miccosukee Indian Village on Tamiami Trail in 1972

The Miccosukee Tribe operates a gift shop, general store, service station, and the Miccosukee Indian Village Museum on the Tamiami Trail Reservation along U.S. 41. In addition to the Miccosukee Resort & Gaming hotel in Miami-Dade County, Florida, now known as the Miccosukee Casino & Resort, at the northwest corner of U.S. 41 and Krome Avenue, the Miccosukee Tribe also operates the Tobacco Shop on the southwest corner. The tribe owns and operates a gas station and service plaza on the Alligator Alley Reservation located on I-75, with a gas station casino of 8,500 square feet and 150 slot machines scheduled to open in November 2023.

Past Miccosukee business interests have included sports sponsorship, extended to several teams in NASCAR, primarily Phoenix Racing and Billy Ballew Motorsports. These include the 2009 Aaron's 499 winning Sprint Cup Series car driven by Brad Keselowski, a Camping World truck driven by Kyle Busch, and a Nationwide car driven by Mike Bliss. The Miccosukee relationship with NASCAR dates to 2002, and it ended prior to the start of the 2010 season.

== Museum ==
The Miccosukee Indian Village Museum opened in 1983. The museum offers to its visitors a variety of artistic expressions such as native paintings, hand crafts, and photographs. Additionally, it is possible to find some artifacts such as cooking utensils that are also on display. The Museum is located at 41 Tamiami Trail, Miami, Florida, 33131.

== Education ==
The Miccosukee Indian School is the tribal school. The Bureau of Indian Affairs established the school in 1962, and the tribe took over administration operations in 1971. The Miccosukee educational system offers a Head Start Preschool Program and kindergarten through 12 grade classes as well as vocational and other higher education programs.

== Notable Miccosukee ==
- Kinhagee, (c. 1750 – c. 1819), the last chief of the Creek of Miccosukee, Florida, who was defeated in battle in 1818 by U.S. forces commanded by General Andrew Jackson. Later Kinhagee's people migrated south, maintaining their local village name Miccosukee as the name of the tribe.
- Capechimico, Miccosukee war chief, First Seminole War.
- Miccopotokee, Miccosukee leader, Second Seminole War.
- Thlocklo Tustenuggee (Tiger Tail), (d. 1843) Miccosukee leader, Second Seminole War.
- Ar-pi-uck-i (Abiaki, Abiaka, Sam Jones; c. 1781 – c. 1864), Miccosukee war chief and medicine man, Second Seminole War.
- The Prophet (Otulke-thloco), Miccosukee war chief, Second Seminole War.
- Ingraham Billy, Miccosukee medicine man.
- William McKinley Osceola, Miccosukee Trail Indian.
- Buffalo Tiger (Heenehatche), (1920–2015), first chairman of the Miccosukee Tribe of Indians of Florida, led initiatives for self-determination
