= Marco Antonio Rivera Useche =

Venezuelan musician and composer (1895–1990)

- Born: 19 June 1895; San Cristóbal, Táchira, Venezuela
- Died: 15 July 1990 (aged 95)
- Occupations: Musician; composer
- Years active: 1912–1968
- Style: Classical
- Spouse: Juanita Moreno Morales (m. 1937)
- Children: 5
- Relatives: Luis Felipe Ramón y Rivera (cousin)

Marco Antonio Rivera Useche (19 June 1895, San Cristóbal – 15 July 1990) was a Venezuelan musician and composer.

== Education ==
Rivera was of humble origins. After completing primary education, he began to work, eventually practicing the trades of carpentry, jewelry, heraldry and shoemaking. In 1910, he began studying music with the Italian master Nicolas Constantino Chicaroni (Bitonto, Italy, 1857 – San Cristóbal, 1927), who had arrived in San Cristóbal in the company of other Italian musicians to be incorporated into the Táchira State Band, including Angelo Mottola (1881–1966), author of the state Hymn of Anzoátegui.

== Career ==
From 1912, Rivera became a full member of the Táchira State band, and from 1913, he started to receive a salary of 100 Venezuelan bolívars per month. In 1916, he was exiled for a short period to Colombia for a confrontation with the president of the state, Eustace Gomez, cousin to the president of Venezuela, Juan Vicente Gómez. On his return, he began to study English with a German professor named Sildner.

He again went into exile in Colombia in 1919 but continued his musical studies there. He returned to Venezuela to join a band in Maracaibo with the misfortune that Eustace Gomez was present at the premiere of the band, who had him arrested along with other Táchira musicians. He was taken to San Cristóbal and imprisoned for two years.

During his confinement, he began composing his first waltz, and on his release in 1921, he moved back to Maracaibo where he contracted malaria. While in Maracaibo, and through an American friend, he studied orchestration and harmony by correspondence in an American school. He returned to San Cristóbal in 1924, where he dedicated himself to the composition of waltzes, foxtrots and bambucos. In 1927, on the death of Nicolas Constantine, who also directed the Infantil de la Iglesia band, the pastor Maldonado made Rivera responsible for the management of this band. He also took charge of the Táchira Band from 1929.

== Personal life ==
He married Juanita Moreno Morales in 1937, with whom he had five children.

== Legacy ==
Rivera was co-founder of the Táchira School of Music, directed by his cousin Luis Felipe Ramón y Rivera. Among his extensive work is the San Cristóbal State hymn. In 1934, he founded the state Chamber Orchestra. He was among the founders of the Atheneum Reading Room of Táchira, an initiative of Charles Rangel Lamus. Following a trip to America to attend a meeting of bands, he conceived the idea of changing the band into on the Symphonic Concert Band; this he achieved in 1966. In 1968, he retired from the position of band director and retired to San Pedro del Río.

Rivera left a long list of musical production in various genres, including bambuco, waltz, foxtrot, fantasies for concert, contra dance, the galerón, hymns, intermezzo, joropo, overtures and marches. Today, the Official Concert Band of Táchira is named after him.
