= Miccosukee Indian School =

K-12 tribal school in unincorporated Miami-Dade County, Florida

Coordinates: 25.7603°N 80.7953°W

Information
- Established: c.1963
- Enrollment: 106 (1998)
- Language: English; Mikasuki

Miccosukee Indian School is a K-12 tribal school in unincorporated Miami-Dade County, Florida, with a Miami postal address. It is affiliated with the Bureau of Indian Education (BIE). It is located along the Tamiami Trail.

It serves the Miccosukee Indian Reservation of the Miccosukee Tribe of Indians of Florida, federally recognized since 1962.

== History ==
In 1963 the Bureau of Indian Affairs (BIA) established the school. The Miccosukee tribe took control of the school in 1971, making it the first school which the BIA contracted with but did not own. The school established a board with seven people, as per the Indian Self-Determination Act. The tribe had not signed any treaties with the federal government at that point, so it was able to have more of a say in how the school board was developed.

In 1984 the Florida Senate offered the school $60,000 to assist the school in helping its students prepare for admission to Florida universities if they chose. For instance, the school began to offer instruction on computers and on foreign languages.

Its current campus was scheduled to open in 1999, with a cost of $9 million generated from casino revenues.

== Curriculum ==
In 1984 the school had no computer instruction. Its language courses were limited to English and Miccosukee, with no other foreign language instruction. In 1984 the school sought to implement reforms to meet Florida's new course recommendations for university readiness, although it is not required to follow Florida law on education.

In 2015, the U.S. government gave the school permission to use a different definition of Adequate Yearly Progress within the Elementary and Secondary Education Act so that they could better meet their students' needs.

== Student discipline ==
The board in 1971 ruled that members of the tribe were not obligated to attend the school. School absenteeism was noted as an issue in 1983.

== Athletics ==
The Florida High School Athletic Association (FHSAA) expelled the school after the students failed to appear for a scheduled game. Reportedly the van driver left his duties after a dispute with his wife, who was one of the athletes. The school community was not interested in staying in the league, and did not rejoin for a period.

In 1981 the school hired Ron Miller as an athletic coach from Liberty City, Miami, allowing it to develop team sports. That year the principal, Jacques Wilson, stated that after students initially reacted negatively to Miller, an African American, he gained their respect. The school by 1983 rejoined the FHSAA under Miller.

== Student body ==
In 1983 the school, had about 30 students, serving grades 7-12. In 1998, it had 106 students. For the 2023-2024 school year, there were 165 students.
