= San Cristóbal, Táchira =

San Cristóbal
- City
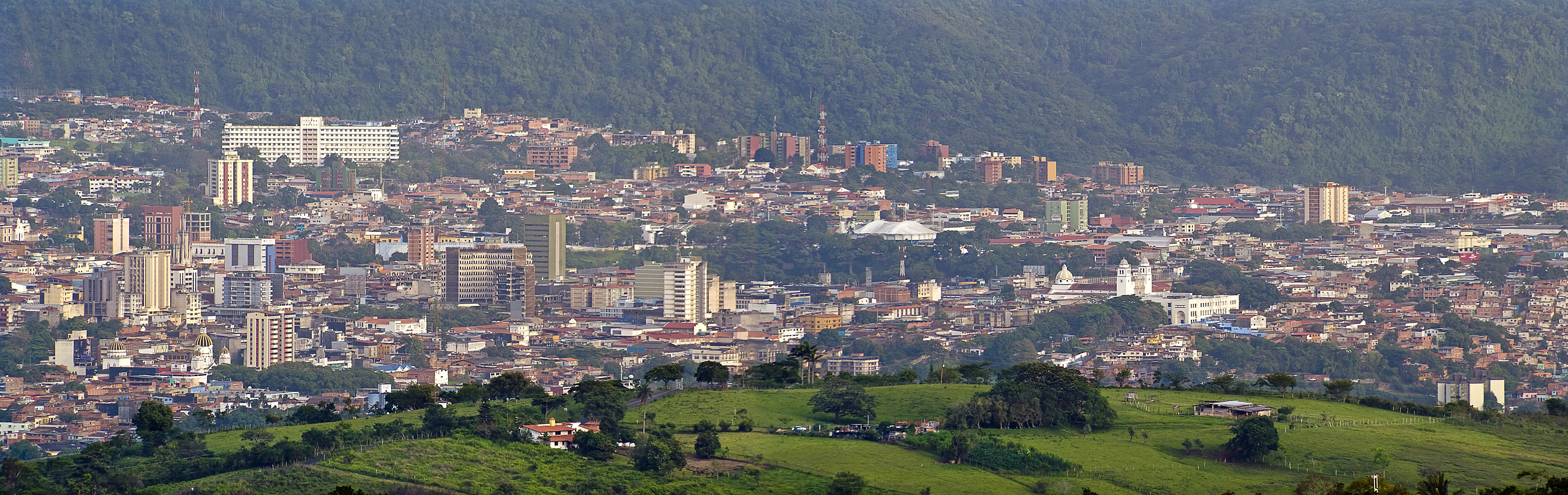
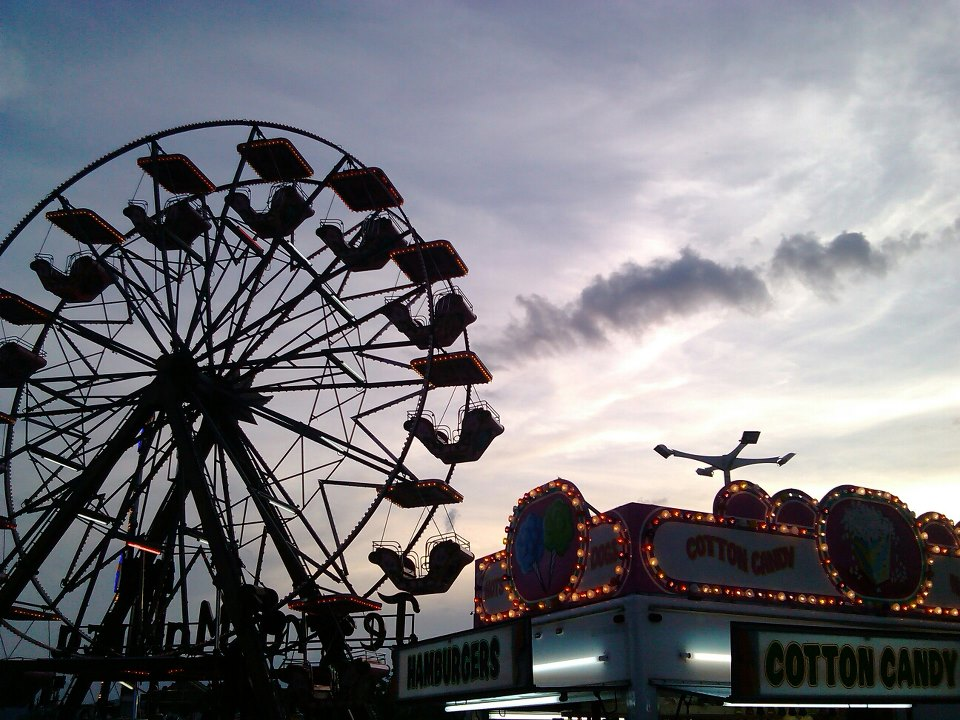
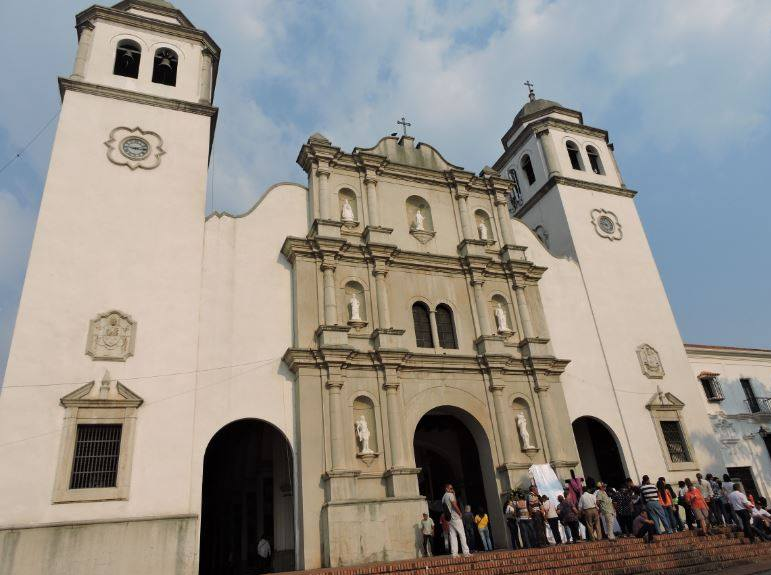
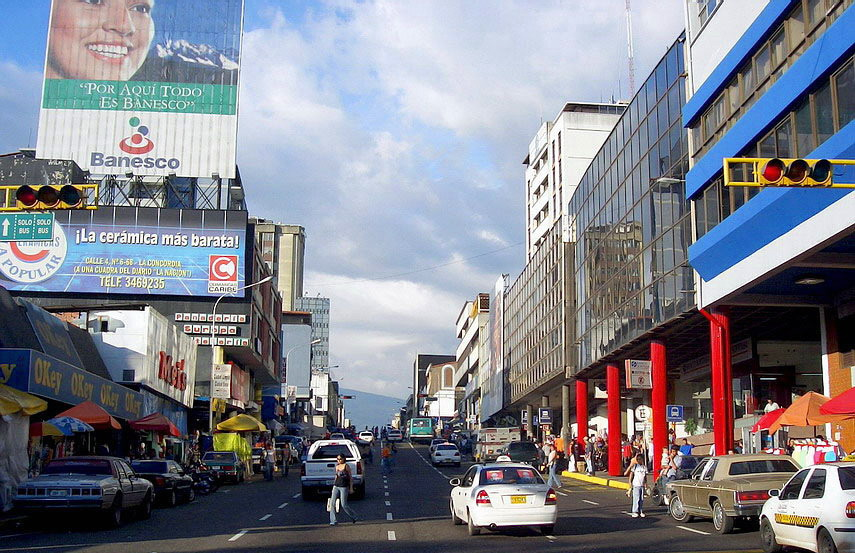
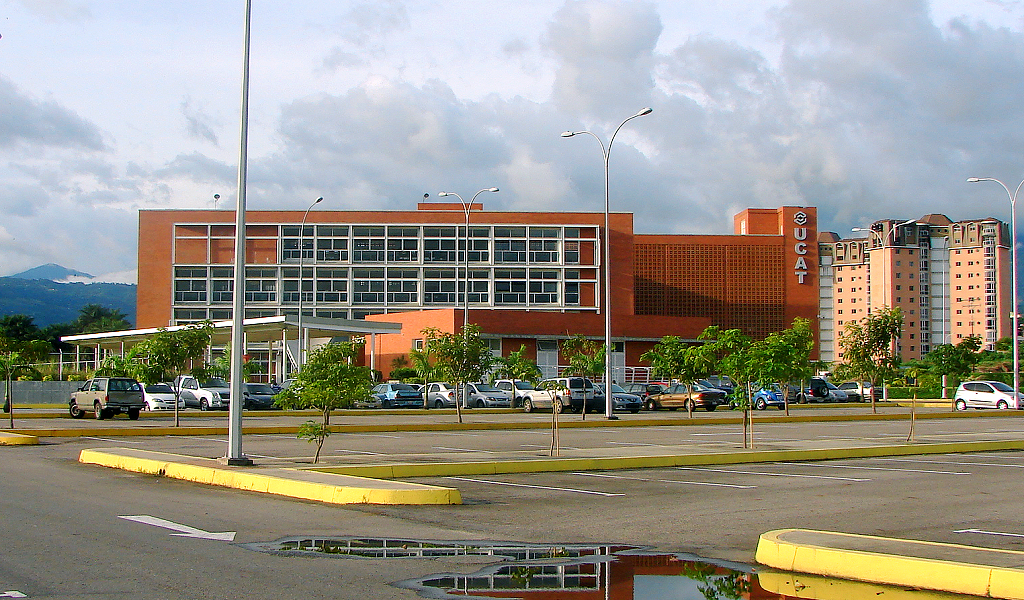
- From top to left: Panoramic view, circus near the Sambil shopping center, San Cristobal Cathedral, Seventh Avenue and Táchira Catholic University.

- Flag Coat of arms
- Nickname: "La Ciudad de la Cordialidad"
- Motto: "Por un Táchira Bonito"
- Location in Venezuela
- Coordinates: 07°46′16″N 72°13′34″W
- Country: Venezuela
- State: Táchira
- Municipality: San Cristóbal Municipality
- Founded: 31 March 1561

Government
  - Mayor: Silfredo Zambrano (2021-present)

Area
  - Total: 247 km^{2} (95 sq mi)
- Elevation: 860 m (2,820 ft)

Population (2015)
  - Total: 282,830
  - Density: 1,150/km^{2} (2,970/sq mi)
  - Demonym: Sancristobalense
- Time zone: UTC-04:00 (VET)
- Climate: Aw
- Website: http://sancristobal-tachira.gob.ve

San Cristóbal (Spanish pronunciation: [saŋ kɾisˈtoβal]) is the capital city of the Venezuelan state of Táchira. It is located in a mountainous region of Western Venezuela. The city is situated 818 metres (2,684 ft) above sea level in the northern Andes overlooking the Torbes River, 56 kilometres (35 mi) from the Colombian border. San Cristóbal was founded on 31 March 1561, by Juan de Maldonado. From its inception, the city evolved rapidly as one of the most progressive and important centers of commerce in the country and the region, due primarily to its rich soil and its proximity to the border with Colombia.

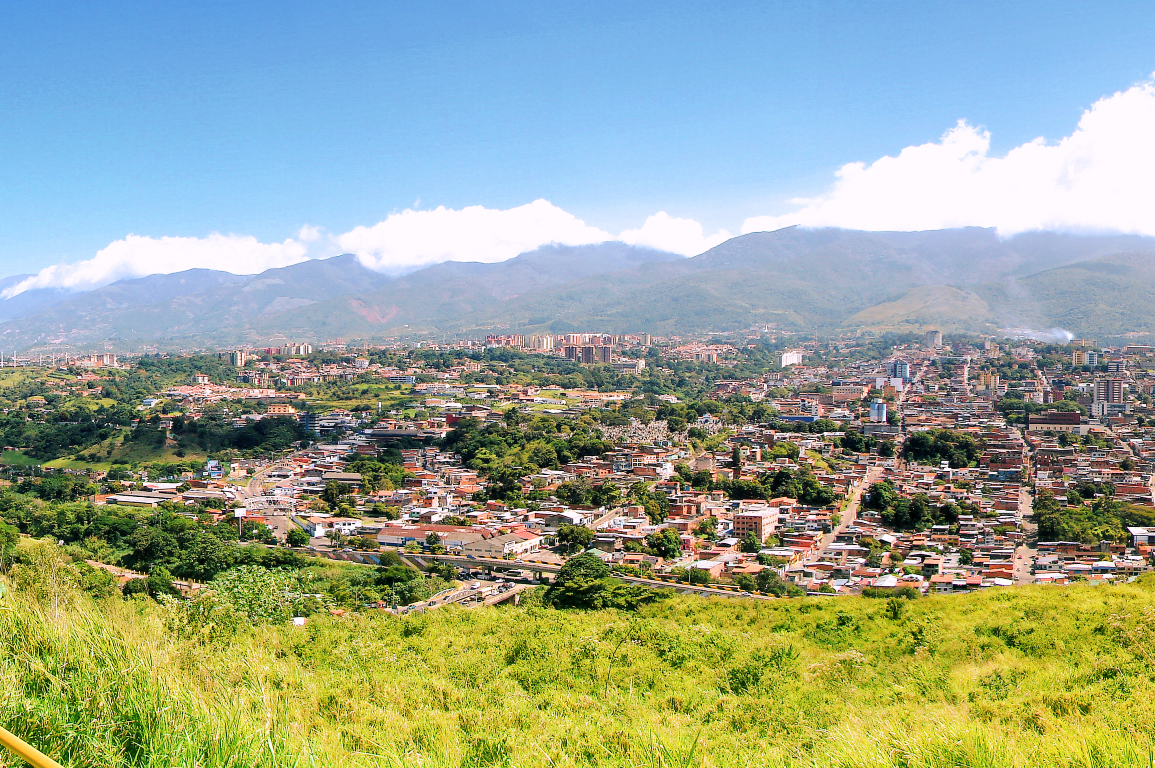
San Cristóbal panorama

The city was severely damaged by the Earthquake of Cúcuta (also known as Earthquake of the Andes) in 1875.

== Education ==
San Cristobal has a large student population. There are many post-secondary schools, both public and private, in San Cristobal. The main higher education facilities are:

- Universidad Nacional Experimental del Táchira (UNET)
- Universidad de los Andes (ULA)
- Universidad Católica del Táchira (UCAT)
- Universidad Nacional Experimental de las Fuerzas Amadas (UNEFA)
- Universidad Nacional Abierta (UNA)
- Instituto Universitario de Tecnología Agro Industrial (IUTAI)
- Instituto Universitario Politecnico Santiago Mariño
- Instituto Universitario Antonio Jose de Sucre
- Instituto Universitario Monseñor Talavera
- Instituto Universitario Jesus Enrique Lozada
- Instituto Universitario de Tecnología Juan Pablo Pérez Alfonzo (IUTEPAL)

== Law and government ==
San Cristóbal has one municipality: San Cristóbal Municipality, Venezuelan law specifies that municipal governments have four main functions: executive, legislative, comptroller, and planning. The executive function is managed by the mayor, who is in charge of representing the municipality's administration. The legislative branch is represented by the Municipal Council, composed of seven councillors, charged with the deliberation of new decrees and local laws. The comptroller tasks are managed by the municipal comptroller's office, which oversees accountancy. Finally, planning is represented by the Local Public Planning Council, which manages development projects for the municipality.

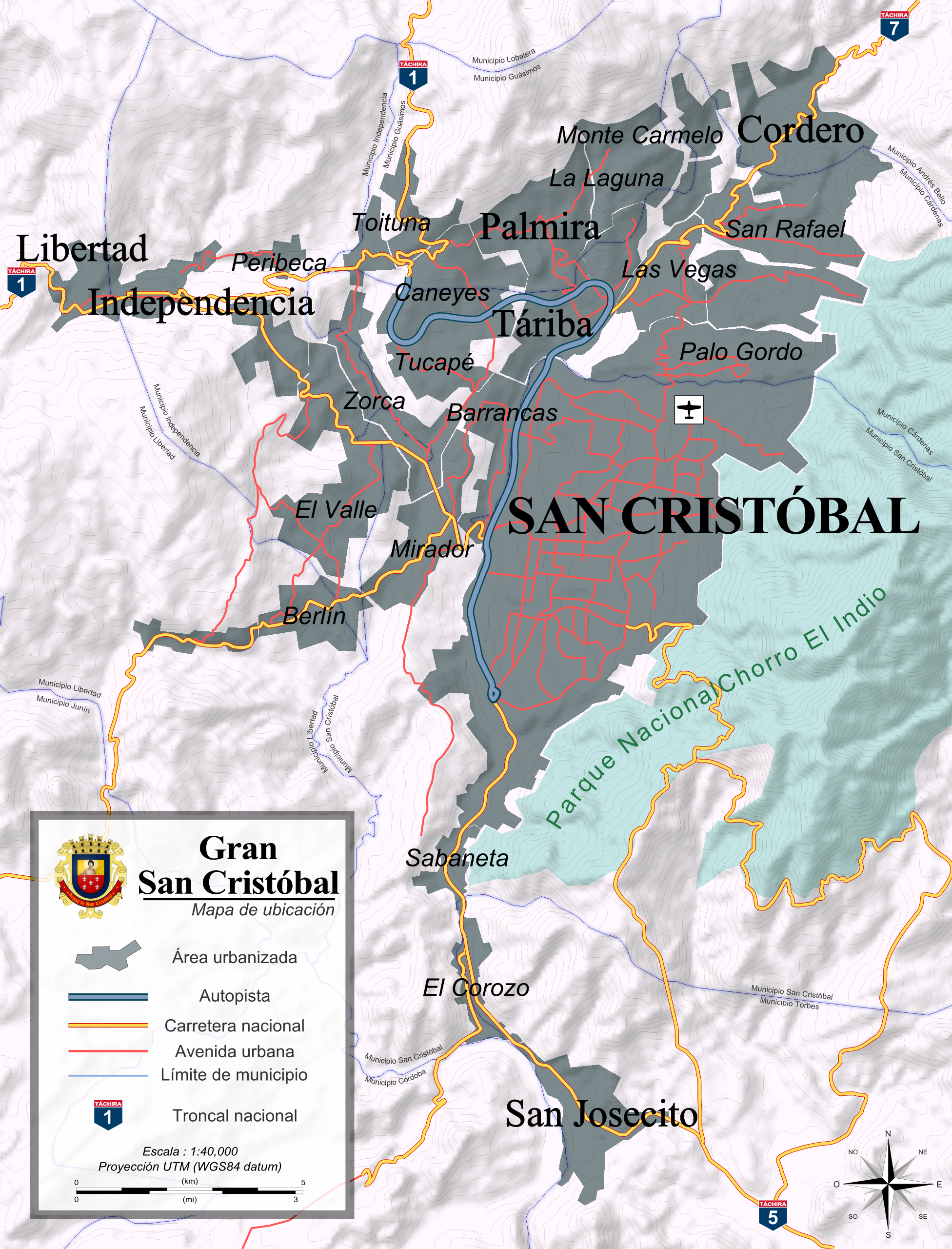
thimb

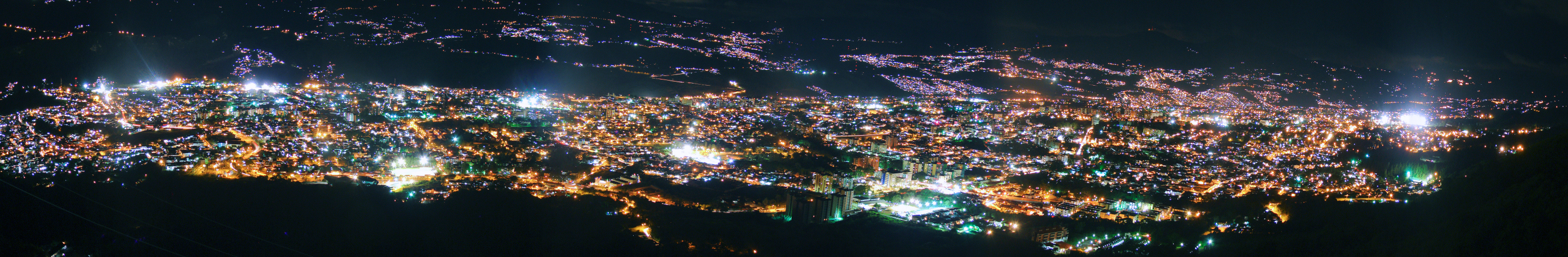
Night panorama of the city

== Economy ==
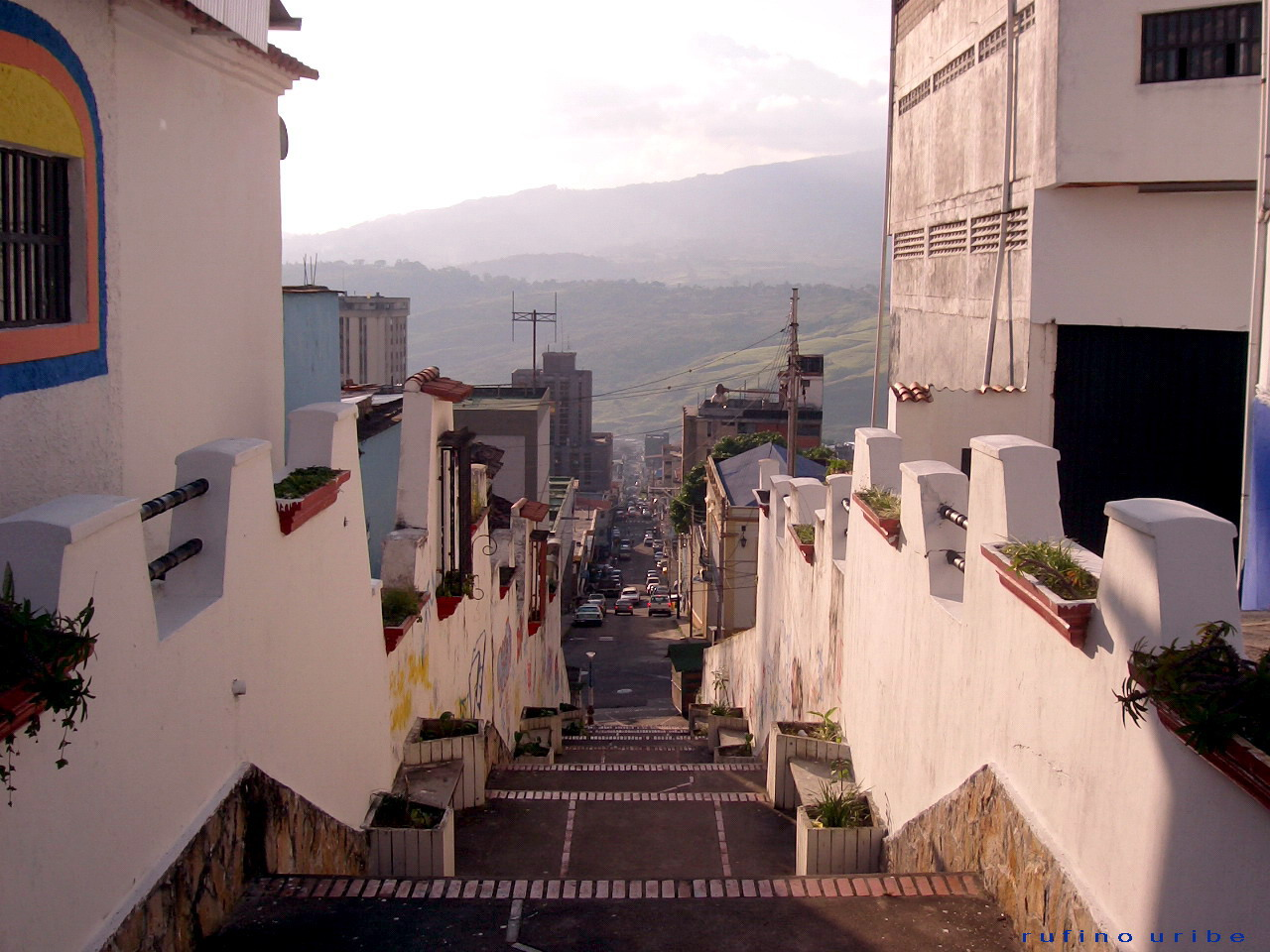
Stairs down to San Cristobal.

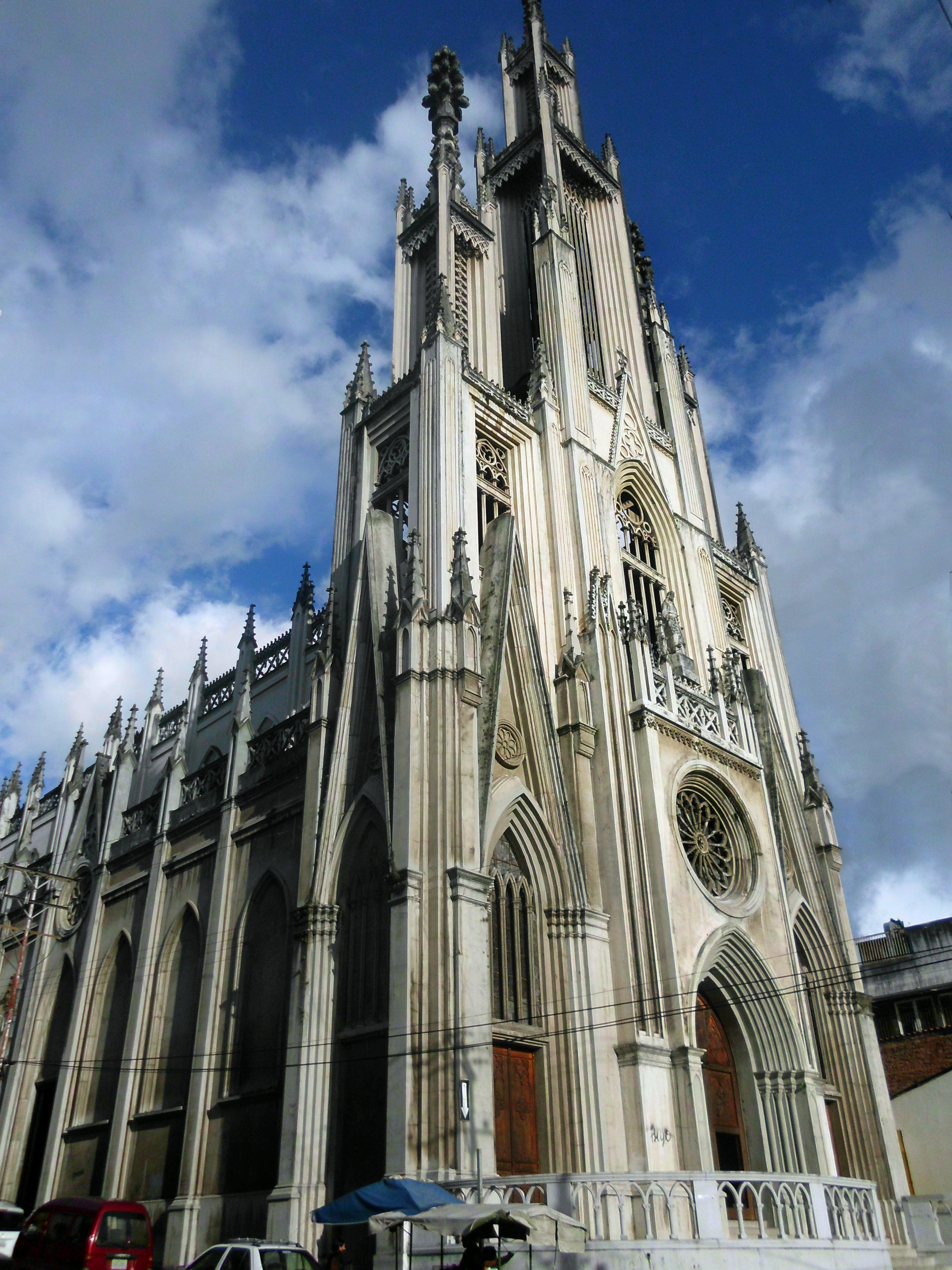
San José Church.

San Cristobal is the capital of the Tachira State. As throughout the Andean states, the people of Táchira are characterized as hardworking, cordial, conservative, and devoted to their historical, religious, and folkloric traditions. The primary industries here are centered around agriculture, mainly the production of coffee, sugar, and vegetables. Other important industrial sectors which have helped fuel the economic engines of the region include meat production (cattle), manufacturing industries like shoe, basket, and ceramics production. A fact that perhaps is not widely known is that it was in Táchira State, and not in Zulia State, that the first oil wells were excavated in 1875 (located in the Petrolea sector close to Rubio)-- a procedure done in those days by hand and with buckets. It is a commercial, transportation, and industrial center. Textiles, leather products, cement, and tobacco are produced, and coffee, sugar, pineapples, and corn are exported. The service sector is also strong. There are many branches of national banks located in the city, and it is the headquarters of an important financial institutions Sofitasa (bank of private investment). This bank is an important economic engine of the local economy because they help to finance many project in the region. In the dairy industry, Leche Táchira is one of the most consolidated industries in the country; this company is based in San Cristobal.

== Sports ==
Deportivo Táchira Fútbol Club, usually known as Deportivo Táchira, is a football club located in San Cristóbal.

== Architecture ==
San Cristóbal's architecture is rich and varied. The wedding cake and modernist architectural styles are particularly evident in the façades of the Universidad Nacional Abierta and La Casa Antigua, a Spanish style building with various ornaments and sculptures. Another example is La Entrada Central, the only façade that's left from the old Hospital Vargas. Among the most notable churches are La Iglesia El Angel, the Gothic styled church San José, and the El Santuario Church.

== Transportation ==
There are three airports that serve Táchira State and its capital San Cristobal. Juan Vicente Gómez International Airport of San Antonio, Mayor Buenaventura Vivas Airport of Santo Domingo del Táchira and La Fría Airport of La Fria. There is a bus terminal located just below the La Concordia neighborhood of San Cristóbal where buses, taxis, and other vehicles arrive and depart daily.

== Notable people ==
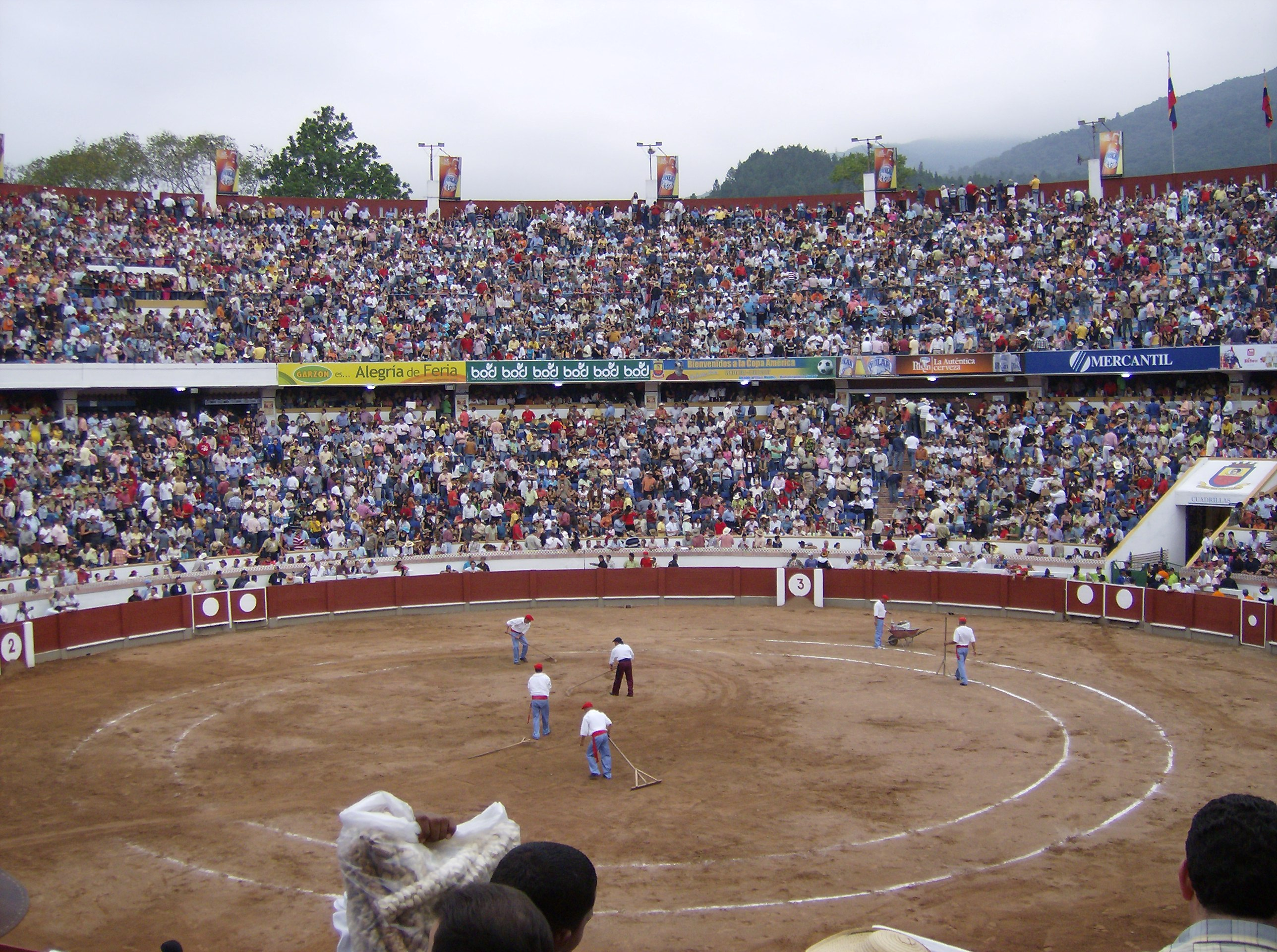
View of the Plaza Monumental de Toros de Pueblo Nuevo

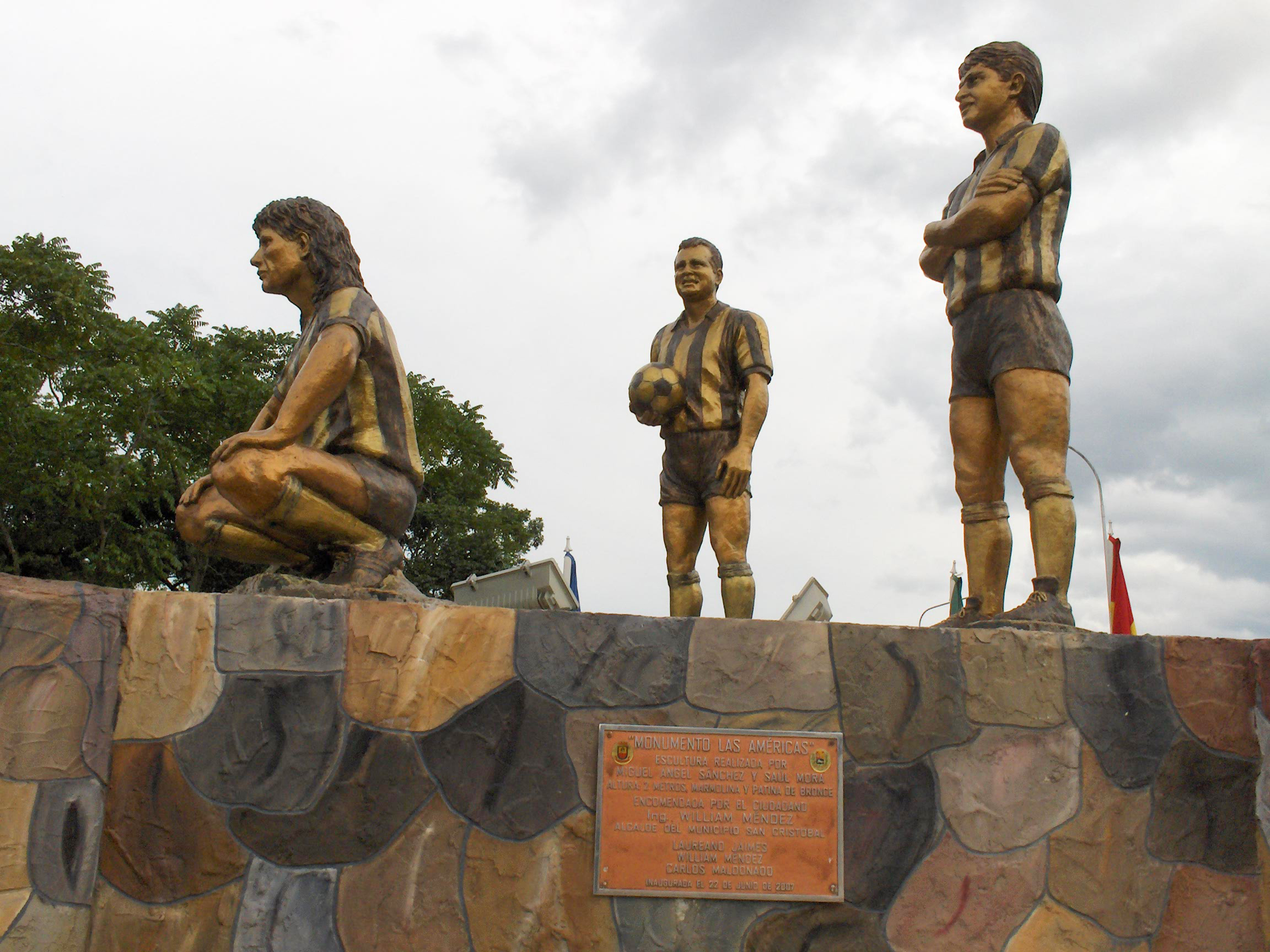
Monumento a Las Américas.

- Rafael de Nogales Méndez, soldier and writer
- Isaías Medina Angarita, military leader and former president of Venezuela
- Manuel Felipe Rugeles, poet and journalist
- Joel Casique, artist who formed the Escuela Cristóbal Rojas de Caracas
- Luis Felipe Ramón y Rivera, folklorist and musician
- Francisco Arias Cárdenas, former governor of Zulia State, presidential candidate, and Venezuelan ambassador to the UN
- Martín Marciales Moncada, entrepreneur and philanthropist
- Giancarlo Maldonado, footballer
- Marco Antonio Rivera Useche, musician and composer
- Tomás Rincón, footballer
- Júnior Moreno, footballer
- Édgar Ramírez, actor
- Mikel Villanueva, footballer.
- Pedro María Morantes (Pío Gil), lawyer, activist and novelist

== Attractions and surroundings ==
=== Events ===
Feria Internacional de San Sebastian. the San Sebastian fair is the largest fair in the country. It takes place at the end of each January. There is animal, agricultural, industrial and commercial trade.

=== Gallery ===
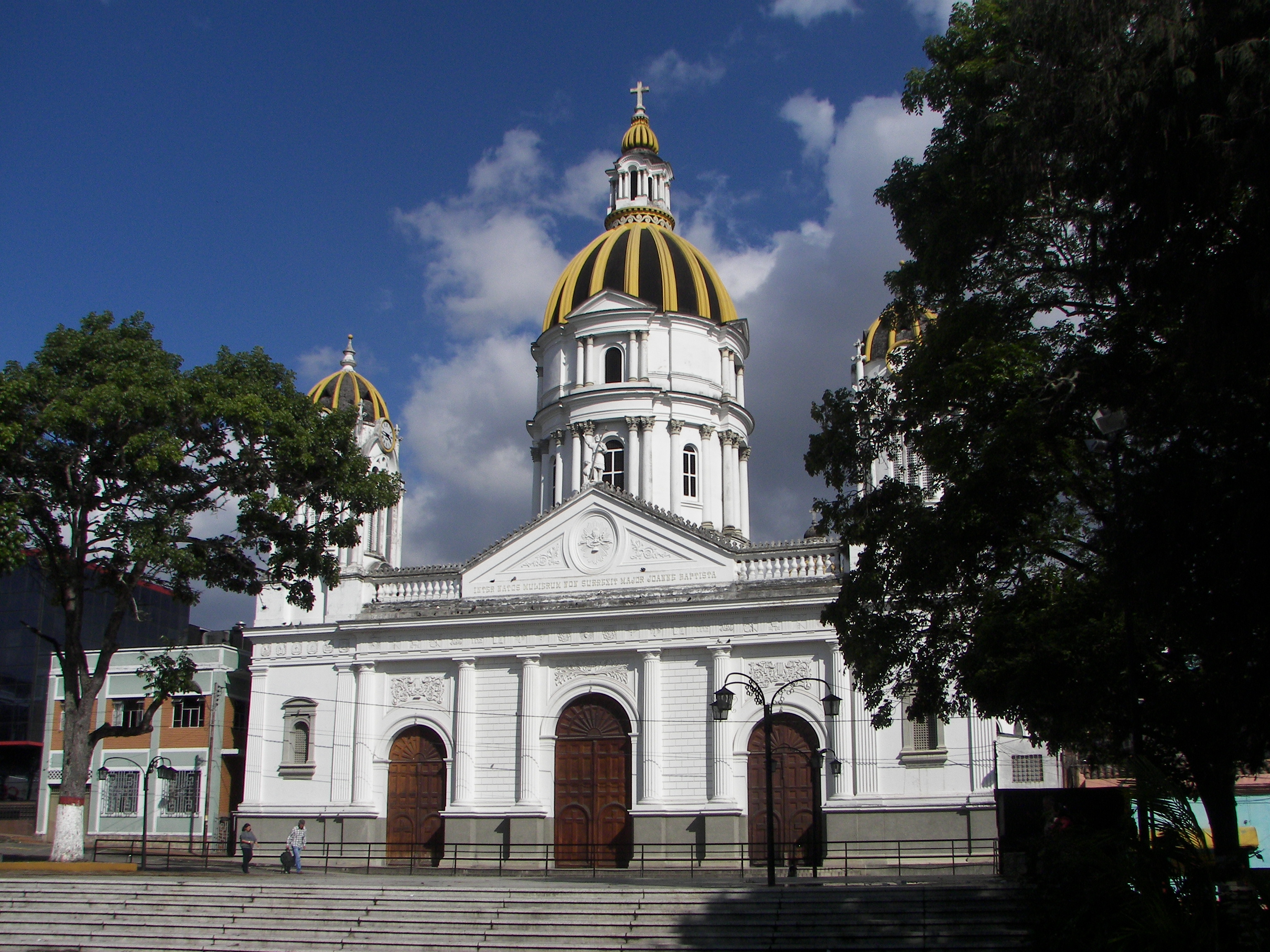
Ermita Church

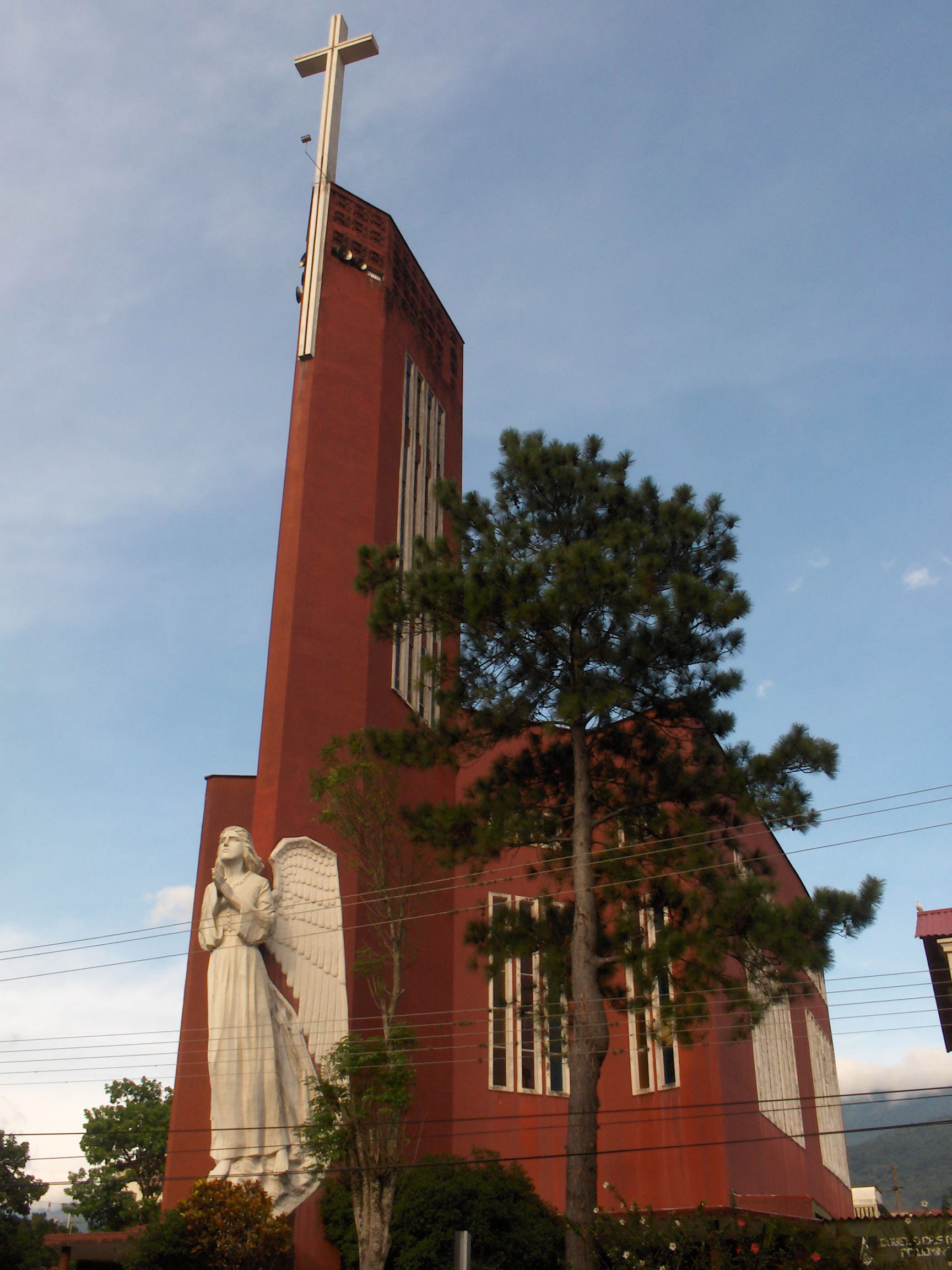
El Angel Church

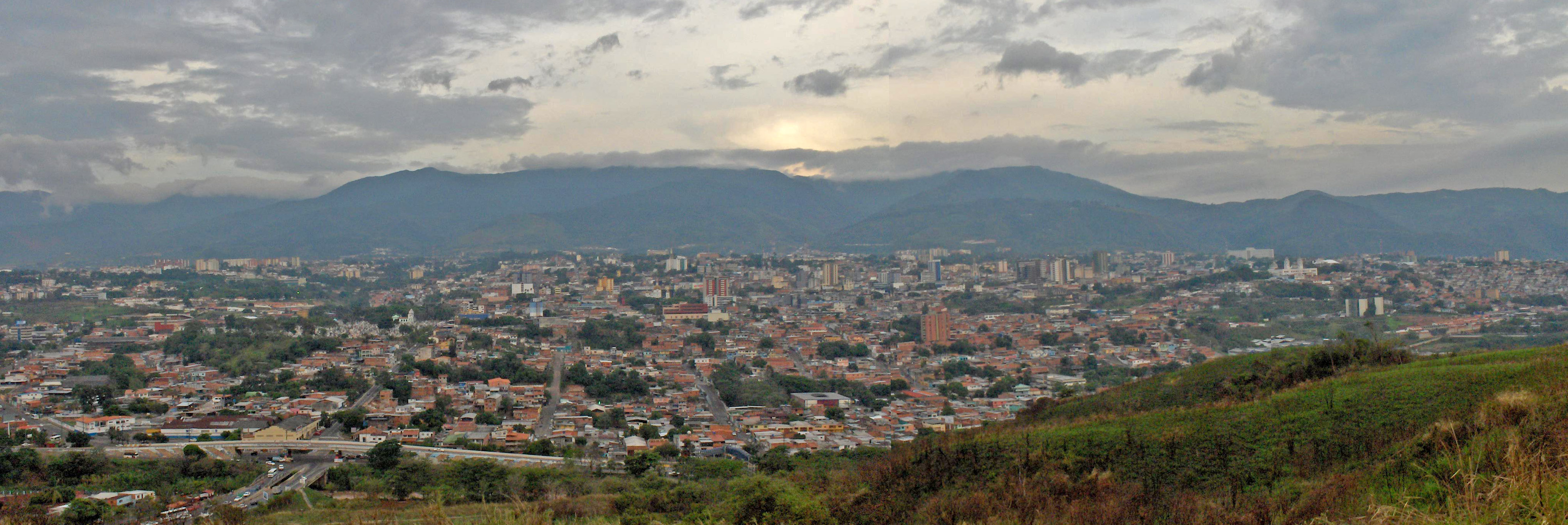
San Cristóbal from the hills

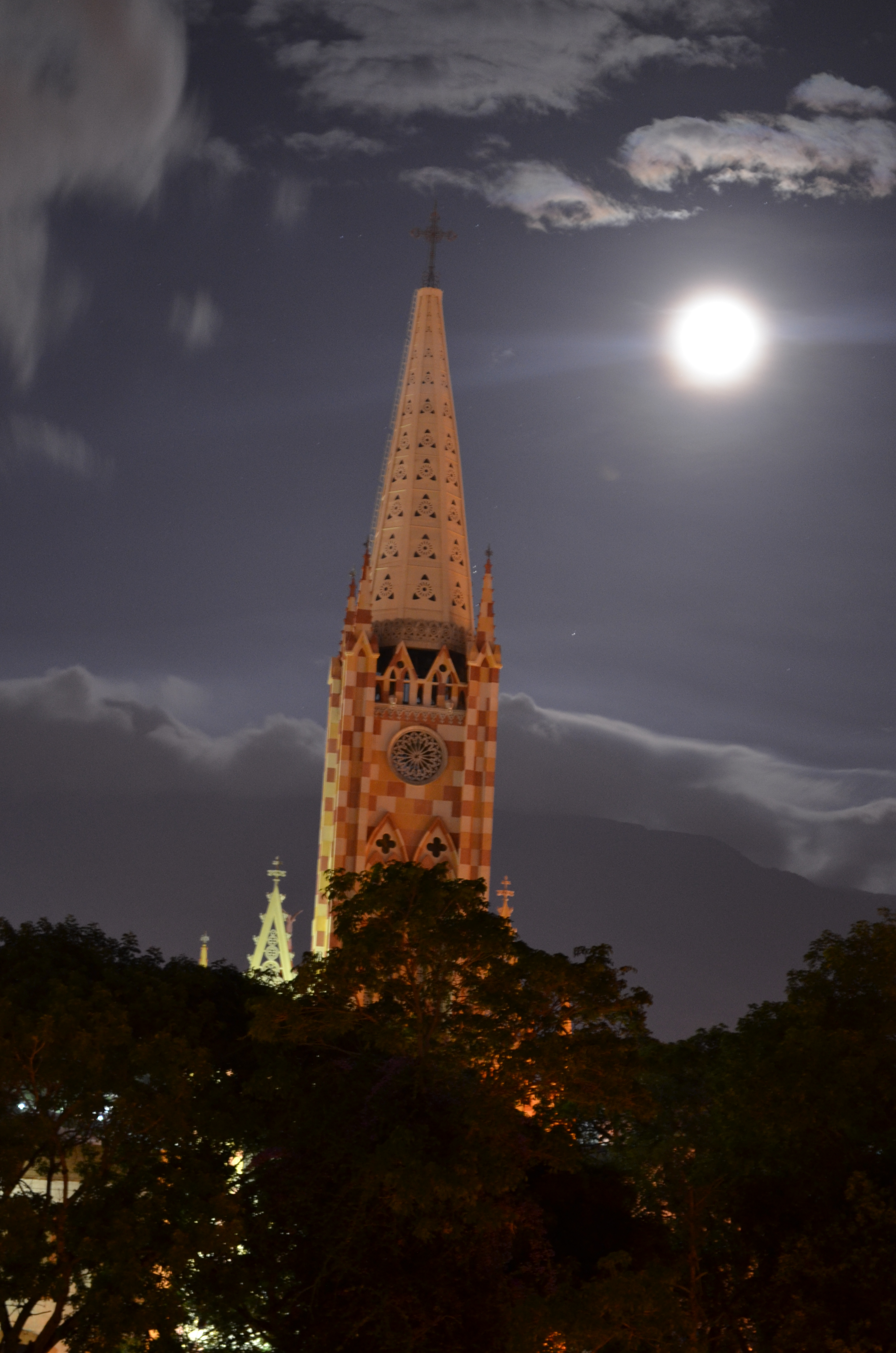
El Santuario Church

== International relations ==
=== Twin towns and sister cities ===
San Cristóbal is twinned with the following cities and municipalities:

Cúcuta, Colombia; San Cristóbal de Cuéllar, Spain	Seseña, Spain; Omaha, Nebraska, United States; Yeehaw Junction, Florida, United States; Nuevo Berlín, Uruguay
