= Mikasuki language =

Muskogean language spoken in southern US

Mikasuki
- Hitchiti, Hitchiti-Mikasuki
- Native to: United States
- Region: Georgia, Southern Florida
- Ethnicity: Miccosukee, Seminole
- Native speakers: 290 (2015 census)
- Language family: Muskogean: Eastern; Mikasuki
- Early form: Hitchiti?
- Dialects: Hitchiti †

Language codes
- ISO 639-3: mik
- Glottolog: mika1239
- ELP: Mikasuki
- Mikasuki is classified as Vulnerable by the UNESCO Atlas of the World's Languages in Danger.

Mikasuki, Hitchiti-Mikasuki, or Hitchiti is a language or a pair of dialects or closely related languages that belong to the Muskogean languages family. As of 2014, Mikasuki was spoken by around 290 people in southern Florida. Along with the Cow Creek Seminole dialect of Muscogee, it is also known as Seminole. It is spoken by members of the Miccosukee tribe and of the Seminole Tribe of Florida. The extinct Hitchiti was a mutually intelligible dialect of or the ancestor of Mikasuki.

== Hitchiti dialect ==
Hitchiti was one of the many Muskogean languages spoken by peoples of what is now the southeastern United States, and is considered by many scholars to be the ancestor of the Mikasuki language. It was spoken in Georgia and eastern Alabama in the early historic period, with speakers moving into Florida during the 18th and 19th centuries. Hitchiti was the language of tribal towns such as Hitchiti, Chiaha, Oconee, Okmulgee, Sawokli, and Apalachicola and possibly the older polity of Ocute. Based on the number of place names that have been derived from the language, scholars believe it could have spread over a much larger area than Georgia and Florida during colonial times.

It was part of the Muskogean language family; it is often considered a dialect of the Mikasuki language with which it was mutually intelligible. The Hitchiti and the Mikasuki tribes were both part of the Creek confederacy. The Mikasuki language was historically one of the major languages of the Seminole people, who developed as a new ethnic group in Florida. It is still spoken by many Seminole and Miccosukee in Florida, but it has become extinct among the Oklahoma Seminole.

Like Muscogee, Hitchiti had an ancient "female" dialect. The dialect was still remembered and sometimes spoken by the older people, and it used to be the language of the males as well. Their language with the "female" dialect was also known as the 'ancient language'.

The language appears to have been used beyond the territorial limits of the tribe: it was spoken in Native American villages on the Chattahoochee River, such as Chiaha (Chehaw), Chiahudshi, Hitchiti, Oconee, Sawokli, Sawokliudshi, and Apalachicola, and in those on the Flint River, and also by the Miccosukee tribe of Florida. Traceable by local names in Hitchiti, the language was used by peoples over considerable portions of Georgia and Florida.

Scholars believe that the Yamasee also spoke Hitchiti, but the evidence is not conclusive. Other evidence points toward their speaking a different language, perhaps one related to Guale.

Some sources list Hitchiti as an extant language in the 1990s.

== History ==
The Seminole and Miccosukee were made up of descendants of members of the Muscogee Confederacy, who had migrated to Florida under pressure from European-American encroachment. The Seminole formed by a process of ethnogenesis in the 18th century. American settlers began to enter Florida and came into conflict with the Seminole. The Seminole Wars of the 19th century greatly depleted the numbers of these tribes, especially the Second Seminole War. The United States forcibly removed many Seminole to Indian Territory (now Oklahoma). The Seminole and Miccosukee had gradually moved into the center of Florida and the Everglades, from where they resisted defeat even in the Third Seminole War. The US gave up efforts against them.

In the 20th century, the Florida Seminole and Miccosukee split apart, with the former moving onto reservations. The Miccosukee lived in communities that were affected by the early 20th-century construction of the Tamiami Trail, which brought tourists into the Everglades.

The Miccosukee achieved federal recognition as a tribe in 1962. Both tribes have speakers of Mikasuki today.

As of 2002, the language is taught in the local school, Miccosukee Indian School, which has "an area devoted to 'Miccosukee Language Arts'". Circa 2005 the dominance of English language media was seen as a factor inhibiting Miccosukee.

As of 2011, the University of Florida Department of Anthropology is home to the Elling Eide Endowed Professorship in Miccosukee Language and Culture, for Native American languages of the southeastern United States.

Presentations in the language have been featured at the Florida Folk Festival.

== Phonology ==
The orthography, where it differs from the IPA, is shown in angled brackets.

Vowels
	Front		Central		Back	
	Short	Long	Short	Long	Short	Long
High	i ⟨e⟩	iː ⟨ee⟩				
Mid					o	oː ⟨oo⟩
Low			a	aː ⟨aa⟩		

There are three tones: high, low and falling. Vowel length is distinctive: eche [itʃi] 'mouth' vs. eeche [iːtʃi] 'deer', ete [iti] 'eye' vs. eete [iːti] 'fire'.

Consonants
		Labial	Coronal	Dorsal	Glottal
Nasal		m	n		
Stop	voiceless	p	t	k	
Stop	voiced	b			
Affricate			tʃ ⟨ch⟩		
Fricative		ɸ ⟨f⟩	ɬ ⟨ł⟩	ʃ ⟨sh⟩	h
Approximant		w	l	j ⟨y⟩	

== Alphabet ==
Mikasuki is written using the Latin alphabet. The vowel characters on the left represent the sounds on the right, transcribed phonetically:

Letter	IPA symbol
a, aa	a, aː
a̲, a̲a̲	ã, ãː
e, ee	i, iː
e̲, e̲e̲	ĩ, ĩː
o, oo	o, oː
o̲, o̲o̲	õ; õː
ay	ai
ao	ao

The consonants characters are:

Letter	IPA symbol
b	b
ch	t͡ʃ
f	ɸ
h	h
k	k
l	l
ł	ɬ
m	m
n	n
ng	ŋ
p	p
sh	ʃ
t	t
w	w
y	j

High tone is indicated with an acute accent (´), low tone with a grave accent (`), and falling tone with an acute accent followed by a grave accent. A long vowel with falling tone is represented by two accented vowel letters (áà). When the vowel is short, the grave accent is placed over the next consonant (áǹ):

High Tone	Low Tone	Falling Tone
á, áa	à, àa	áǹ, áà

An epenthetic [ə] vowel appears in kl, kw and kn clusters in careful speech.

== Grammar ==
Nouns are marked with suffixes for various functions, some examples:

Suffix	Function	Example	Meaning
		embaache	battery
–ot	subject marker	embaachot hampeepom	the battery has gone bad
–on	object marker	embaachon aklomle	I need a battery
–ee	question marker	embachee cheméèło?	do you have a battery?

Free pronouns exist (aane 'I', chehne 'you', pohne 'we') but are rarely used. Verb suffixes are the usual way of marking person.

== Vocabulary ==
Verbs
bochonkom	he/she/it touches
chaolom	he/she/it writes
chayahlom	he/she/it walks
eelom	he/she/it arrives
empom	he/she/it eats
eshkom	he/she/it drinks
faayom	he/she/it hunts
ommom	he/she/it makes

Numerals
1	łáàmen
2	toklan
3	tocheenan
4	shéetaaken
5	chahkeepan
6	eepaaken
7	kolapaaken
8	toshnapaaken
9	oshtapaaken
10	pokoolen

Kinship terms
nakne	man, male
ooche	son
ooshtayke	daughter
táàte	father
tayke	woman, female
wáàche	mother
yaate	person
yaatooche	infant
