= Oconee (tribal town) =

Historical Muscogee tribal town

Coordinates: 34.8403°N 83.0663°W

Oconee was a tribal town of Hitchiti-speaking Indigenous peoples of the Southeastern Woodlands during the 17th and 18th centuries.

First mentioned by the Spanish as part of the Apalachicola Province on the Chattahoochee River, Oconee moved with other towns of the province to central Georgia between 1690 and 1692. In 1715, early in the Yamasee War, Oconee and the other towns of the former Apalachicola Province moved back to the Chattahoochee River. Around 1750, part of the people of Oconee, under the leadership of Ahaya, moved to Florida, settling next to the Alachua Prairie.

The members of the tribal town in Florida were joined by people from other Hitchiti-speaking towns and became Seminoles. The remaining Oconee members stayed on the Chattahoochee River through the 18th century.

== Name ==
Oconee is also written Aconnee, Ocone, and Oconi. "Oconee", "Ocone", and "Oconi" were also the names of a Timucua chiefdom in Southeastern Georgia, an Apalachee town in northern Florida, and a Cherokee town in western South Carolina.

== On the Chattahoochee ==
Oconee was one of a number of towns in the Apalachicola Province on the Chattahoochee River in Alabama and Georgia in the first half of the 17th century. The towns were situated along 160 kilometres (100 mi) of the river from the south of the falls at present-day Columbus to Barbour County, Alabama. A variant of the Lamar regional culture, with influences from the Fort Walton culture to the south, developed in the towns along the Chattahoochee River between 1300 and 1400. Oconee was in the southern part of Apalachicola Province, between Sabacola and the town of Apalachicola. The towns of the southern part of Apalachicola Province, including Oconee, spoke the Hitchiti language. The people of Oconee and other Hichiti towns on the Chatthoochee River are believed to have descended from earlier inhabitants of the area. From the 1630s until 1691, Oconee may have been located at the archaeological site 1RU34 in Russell County, Alabama. Oconee was located between the towns of Sabacola and Apalachicola in the late 17th century. In 1677 Oconee was one of the towns that the Chisca intended to wage war on. Although it was not regarded as a leading town in the province, the leading men of Apalachicola Province met at Oconee in June 1690.

== Move to central Georgia ==
Spanish Florida and the English of the Province of Carolina competed for influence in Apalachicola Province in the 1680s. In an effort to exclude English traders from Apalachicola Province, the Spanish built a stockade garrisoned with Spanish soldiers and Apalachee militia in the northern part of the province in 1689. The next year the towns of Apalachicola Province began moving from the Chattahoochee River to the interior of Georgia, closer to their trading partners in Carolina. Spanish records state that Apalachicola Province was completely abandoned by the spring of 1692.

Most of the towns from the Chattahoochee River that moved to central Georgia settled on what the British called Ochese Creek or its tributaries. The British called the people of those towns "Ochese Creek Indians", (Note: The use of the term Creek Indians is falling out of favor, and Muscogee is preferred.) later shortened to "Creek Indians". (Note: The Spanish called Hitchiti-speakers "Ichisi" in the 16th century and "Uchisi" in the 17th century.) Ocheese Creek is now known as the Ocmulgee River, a tributary of the Altamaha River. The town of Oconee was established on another tributary of the Altamaha, now called the Oconee River. (Note: The upper Oconee River basin may have had little or no inhabitants at the time the Oconee town moved there. Archaeologists believe that the population of the river's watershed had fallen by 1650 to 10 to 20% of its 16th century high.) The town of Oconee during this period may have been at the archaeological site 9BL16, at the fall line of the Oconee River.

Soon after the move to central Georgia, starting in 1691, the Apalachicola towns began raiding Spanish missions. After a particularly heavy raid in the Fall of 1694, Apalachees attacked four towns in central Georgia, including Oconee, in retaliation for those raids. One of the towns was caught by surprise, and a number of its people were captured by the Apalachees. The other towns had been abandoned and burned by the time the Apalachees reached them. It is not known which town was the one surprised by the Apalachees.

== Return to Chattahoochee ==
In 1715, the towns that had moved to central Georgia from Apalachicola Province joined with other Native American peoples living in what is now Georgia and South Carolina in war against the British in South Carolina, in what is known as the Yamasee War. The British quickly defeated the Native American attackers. Many Yamassee fled to Spanish Florida, settling near St. Augustine. The Ochese Creek towns moved west, with most of them returning to the Chattahoochee River, where they became known as the Lower Creeks or Lower Towns of the Muscogee Confederacy). Some Oconee may have remained in the Oconee Mountain/Jocassee region and appear to have been incorporated into the Lower Cherokee population, while most Oconee returned to the Chattahoochee River. The 1783 Treaty of Augusta established a boundary between Georgia settlements and the hunting grounds claimed by Creek communities, particularly Lower Creek towns, running from the Savannah River through Ocunna (Oconee) Mountain, the Tugaloo and Currahee mountains, and the headwaters of the Oconee River; the Creek delegation included representatives associated with Lower Creek and Hitchiti-speaking communities, including a ‘Hitcheto warrior Okoney". Most Oconee moved back to the Chattahoochee River that year, and was possibly located at archaeological sites 1RU20 and 1RU21 in Russell County, Alabama from 1715 into the 1750s. As was the case in the 17th century, Oconee was located between Sabacola and Apalachicola, although the town of Ayfitchiti separated Oconee from Apalachicola in 1738.

Pedro de Olivera y Fullana, governor of Spanish Florida, sent Diego Peña, a retired lieutenant from the garrison in St, Augustine, to the towns on the Chattahoochee River three times between 1716 and 1718; in 1717 with an invitation to the towns to move into the former Apalachee and Timucua provinces of Spanish Florida. Several of the towns, including Oconee, agreed to move south (although Oconee stayed on the Chattahoochee). Starting in the 1720s, Oconee was a "point town", one of the Muscogee Confederation towns that usually sided with the British. Of 14 "Uchise" villages, only Ocone and two others remained anti-Spanish. When the British were seeking an alternative to Malatchi Brim, successor of Emperor Brim, as a representative of the Muscogee Confederation, they offered to appoint Wehoffkey of Oconee "to command the whole nation", but Wehoffkey turned them down.

The people of what is now Georgia and the towns on the Chattahoochee, including Oconee, used Florida as a vast hunting ground. Most of the Native Americans in Florida after 1716 were probably from the Lower Towns. Spanish records mention "Uchizes from the village of Ocone" that were killed in 1738 in central Florida during warfare between alliances of Florida tribes. James Oglethorpe, the governor of the Province of Georgia, invaded Spanish Florida in 1740, laying siege to its capitol, St. Augustine. Ahaya, an Oconee chief, led 45 men to join the siege.

Oconee was between Sabacola and Apalachee in the mid-18th century. Late in the 18th century Ocone was on the east bank of the Chattahoochee River (in Georgia) opposite the mouth of Hatchechubbe Creek (which was called "Oconee Creek" at the time) near Cottonton, Alabama. At that time Oconee was approximately six miles south of the town of Apalachicola and six miles north of Sabacola. Several archaeological sites on the east (Georgia) side of the Chattahoochee River have been tentatively identified with Oconee, including 9SS3 and 9SW52. Other archaeological sites along the Chattahoochee associated with Ocone include 9SW3, 9SW4, and 9SW57. Sites 9SW5, 9SW6, and 9SW7 may be associated with either Oconee or Apalachicola.

== Seminole branch ==
About 1750, Ahaya, later called "Cowkeeper" by the British, led a faction of Oconees into Florida in search of a new home. They settled on the edge of the Alachua Savanna. They were joined by Hitchiti-speakers from the towns of Sabacola, Tomathli, Apalachicola, Hitchiti and Chiaha. The first Oconee town was called "Alachua" or "Lockway". Ahaya's people later moved to a new town, Cuscowilla, described as one of the largest settlements of people from the Lower Towns in Florida. At the beginning of the American Revolution, it was the largest Seminole town. William Bartram visited Cuscowilla in 1774.

In the early 1770s, Jonathan Bryan of Georgia persuaded chiefs of the Lower Towns of the Muscogee Confederation to grant him lands in Florida, including the area around the Alachua Savanna occupied by the Alachua Seminoles. The scheme was thwarted, but strained the relationship between the Oconees in Florida and on the Chattahoochee. Indian Superintendent John Stuart reported that Ahaya was no longer connected with the Muscogee Confederation by 1774. Dissension between Oconees was one of the reasons Ahaya's band had moved to Florida. Ahaya's band was the first Hitchiti or Muscogee band in Florida to make a definite break with the Muscogee Confederacy.

== Sources ==
- Andersen, Lars (2001). Paynes Prairie: A History of the Great Prairie. Sarasota, Florida: Pineapple Press. ISBN 978-1-56164-225-0.
- Boyd, Mark F.; Harris, Joseph W. (1951). "The Seminole War: Its Background and Onset". The Florida Historical Quarterly. 30 (1): 3–115. ISSN 0015-4113. JSTOR 30138833.
- Covington, James W. (1968). "Migration of the Seminoles into Florida, 1700-1820". The Florida Historical Quarterly. 46 (4): 340–357. ISSN 0015-4113. JSTOR 30147280.
- Covington, James W. (1993). The Seminoles of Florida. Gainesville, Florida: University Press of Florida. ISBN 978-0-8130-1196-7.
- Fairbanks, Charles H. (1978). "The Ethno-Archaeology of the Florida Seminole". Tacachale: Essays on the Indians of Florida and Southeastern Georgia during the Historic Period. Gainesville, Florida: The University Presses of Florida. pp. 163–193. ISBN 0-8130-0535-3.
- Foster, H. Thomas II (2007). Archaeology of the Lower Muskogee Creek Indians, 1715–1836. The University of Alabama Press. ISBN 978-0-8173-1239-8.
- Hahn, Steven C. (2004). The Invention of the Creek Nation, 1670–1763. University of Nebraska Press. ISBN 0-8032-2414-1.
- Hann, John H. (Fall 1995). "The Demise of the Pojoy and Bomto". The Florida Historical Quarterly. 74 (2): 184–200. JSTOR 30148820.
- Hann, John H. (2006). The Native American World Beyond Apalachee. University Press of Florida. ISBN 978-0-8130-2982-5.
- Kowaleski, Stephen A.; Hatch, James W. (Summer 1991). "The Sixteenth-Century Expansion of Settlement in the Upper Oconee Watershed, Georgia". Southeastern Archaeology. 10 (1): 1–11. JSTOR 40712938.
- Worth, John E. (2000). "The Lower Creeks: Origin and History" (PDF). In McEwan (ed.). Indians of the Greater Southeast: Historical Archaeology and Ethnohistory (Bonnie G. ed.). University of Florida Press. pp. 265–298. ISBN 9-780-8130-2086-0.
- Wright, J. Leitch Jr. (1990) [1986]. Creeks and Seminoles: The Destruction and Regeneration of the Muscogulge People (Paperback ed.). Lincoln, Nebraska: University of Nebraska Press. ISBN 0-8032-9728-9.
