= Pedro Casique =

Peruvian footballer (born 2001)

Personal information
- Full name: Pedro Casique Fernández
- Date of birth: 22 March 2001 (age 25)
- Place of birth: Rioja, Peru
- Height: 1.70 m (5 ft 7 in)
- Position: Winger

Team information
- Current team: Deportivo Ucrania
- Number: 11

Youth career
- Unión Comercio

Senior career*
Years	Team	Apps	(Gls)
2019	Unión Comercio	15	(1)
2020–2021	Ayacucho	15	(0)
2022	Los Chankas	20	(3)
2023–2024	Deportivo Llacuabamba	24	(0)
2025–	Deportivo Ucrania	13	(0)
- * Club domestic league appearances and goals as of 17:31, 26 July 2025 (UTC)

Pedro Casique Fernández (born 22 March 2001) is a Peruvian footballer who plays as a winger for Peruvian Tercera División side Deportivo Ucrania.

== Career ==
=== Club career ===
Casique is a product of Unión Comercio and made his first team debut on 14 April 2019 against FBC Melgar. He started on the bench but replaced David Dioses in the finale minutes. Casique had a good season and although his young age, he was notices for 15 league appearances.

On 6 March 2020 it was confirmed, that 18-year old Casique had joined Ayacucho FC on a deal for 2020.

Ahead of the 2022 season, Casique signed with Los Chankas. In January 2023, he moved to fellow league club Deportivo Llacuabamba.

In October 2024, ahead of the 2025 season, Casique moved to Peruvian Tercera División side Deportivo Ucrania.
