= Miccosukee Indian Reservation =

Native American homeland in Florida, US

- Indian reservation
- Flag

- Location in Florida
- Coordinates: 26.1504374°N 80.8322428°W
- Tribe: Miccosukee Tribe of Indians
- Country: United States
- State: Florida
- Counties: Broward; Miami-Dade

Area
  - Total: 332.18 km^{2} (128.26 sq mi)
- Time zone: UTC−5 (Eastern Time Zone)
  - Summer (DST): UTC−4 (Eastern Daylight Time)
- Website: Miccosukee Resort & Gaming

The Miccosukee Indian Reservation is the homeland of the Miccosukee tribe of Native Americans. It is divided into three sections in two counties of southern Florida, United States. Their total land area is 128.256 mi^{2} (332.18 km^{2}). The Miccosukee Reservation have members living on and off the reservation.

The largest section by far is known as the Alligator Alley Reservation, which is located at the extreme western part of Broward County, at its county line with Collier County. It has a land area of 127.057 mi^{2} (329.08 km^{2}).

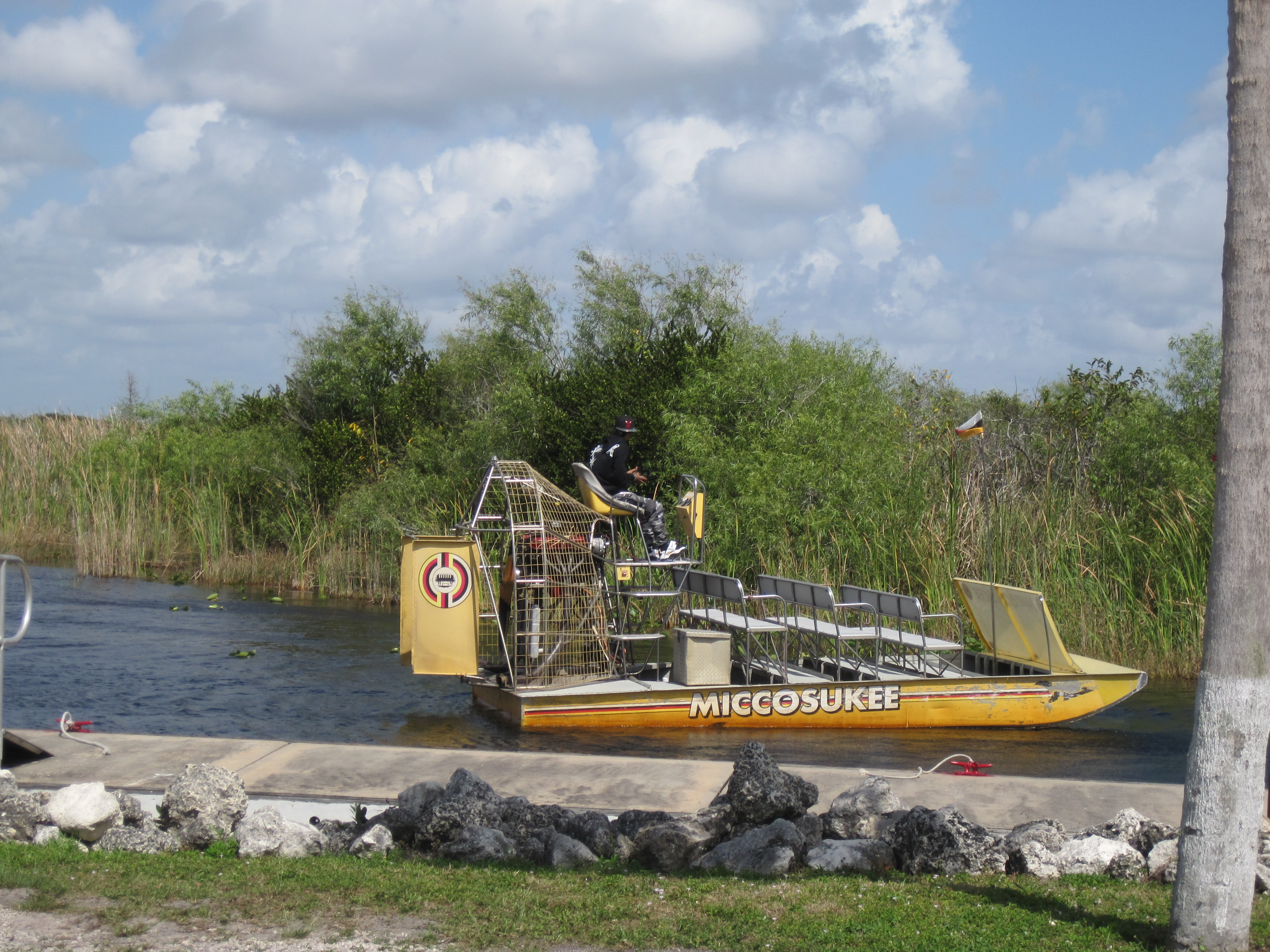
Miccosukee airboat tour in the Florida Everglades

The second largest section is the Tamiami Trail Reservation, which is located 40 miles (64 km) west of Miami, on the Tamiami Trail (U.S. Route 41, or Southwest 8th Street), at the point where the Tamiami Canal turns to the northwest, in western Miami-Dade County. Although this section is much smaller than the Alligator Alley section, it is the center of most tribal operations. It has a land area of 712.64 acres (2.8840 km^{2}).

The smallest section is the Krome Avenue Reservation, located east of the Tamiami Trail section and closer to the city of Miami. It is also on the Tamiami Trail, on the northwest corner of its intersection with Krome Avenue (Southwest 177th Avenue), just west of the community of Tamiami. This section has a land area of only 55.04 acres (0.2227 km^{2}). The Miccosukee Resort & Casino is on this site.

The portions in Miami-Dade County are in unincorporated areas.

== Education ==
Miccosukee Indian School is the tribal school affiliated with the Bureau of Indian Education.

Miami-Dade County Public Schools is the local public school district for residents of Miami-Dade County. For residents of Broward County, the local school district is Broward County School District.
