= Joel Casique =

Venezuelan artist (1958–2010)

Joel Gerardo Casique
- Born: 1958; San Cristóbal
- Died: 17 December 2010 (aged 51–52)
- Education: Art Students League of New York
- Style: Surrealism

Joel Gerardo Casique (born 1958 in San Cristóbal, Venezuela; died 17 December 2010 in Caracas) was an artist who formed the Escuela Cristóbal Rojas de Caracas. He obtained an art degree at the Art Students League of New York. He has exhibited his work in galleries and museums in Venezuela, the United States, and Aruba; he has also participated in national and international fairs, including the sixteenth and seventeenth Ferias Iberoamericanas de Arte (FIA) in Caracas; the 2007 Latin American Art Fair in Miami; and the 2006 Feria Internacional de Arte de Bogotá (ARTBO) in Bogotá, Colombia.

On December 17, 2010, he was killed in his apartment in Caracas.

== Exhibitions ==
=== Solo exhibitions ===
- 2008:Galería Ideobox, Miami
- 2003: Galería 39, Caracas, 2006;
- 2003: Access Art Gallery, Oranjestad, Aruba
- 2000: Graphic Gallery, Caracas
- 1997: New York Film Academy, Nueva York
- 1995: Gomez Gallery, Baltimore, Estados Unidos

=== Collective exhibitions ===
- 2007: Utopías, Galería 39, Caracas
- 2005: Intervención Urbana “Velada Santa Lucía”, Maracaibo, Venezuela
- 2005: V Bienal de Escultura, Museo de Arte Contemporáneo Francisco Narváez, Porlamar, Nueva Esparta, Venezuela
- 2004: “Mutaciones en el Espacio”, Museo Miranda, Los Teques, Miranda, Venezuela
- 2004: “Una Mirada al Lago”, Museo Lía Bermúdez, Maracaibo, Venezuela
- 2003: Arte venezolano del siglo XX. La megaexposición, Museo de Arte Contemporáneo de Caracas
- 2001: IV Bienal del Barro de América, Museo Alejandro Otero, Caracas
- 1999: LVII Salón de Artes Visuales Arturo Michelena, Ateneo de Valencia, Venezuela
- 1998: XXIII Salón Nacional de Aragua (Invitado), Museo de Arte Contemporáneo de Maracay, Venezuela,
- 1998: II Bienal del Paisaje, Museo de Arte Contemporáneo de Maracay, Venezuela
- 1997: V Bienal de Arte de Guayana donde obtiene el Primer Premio, Museo Jesús Soto, Ciudad Bolívar, Venezuela
- 1996: Sculpture Center, Nueva York
- 1995: Premio Amster Prescott, en The National Arts Club, Nueva York
- 1993: National Art Club, Nueva York

=== National and international fairs ===
- XVI y XVII Feria Iberoamericana de Arte. FIA, Caracas, 2007–2008;
- ArteAmericas - Latin American Art Fair, Miami, 2007;
- Feria Internacional de Arte de Bogotá ARTBO, Bogotá, 2006.
