= Luis Felipe Ramón y Rivera =

Venezuelan musician

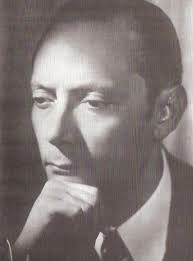
- Born: August 23, 1913; San Cristóbal, Táchira, Venezuela
- Died: October 22, 1993 (aged 80); Caracas, Venezuela
- Occupations: Folklorist, writer, poet, teacher, composer, musician
- Writing career
- Subject: Venezuelan Folklore

Luis Felipe Ramón y Rivera (August 23, 1913 - October 22, 1993) was a Venezuelan musician, composer and writer. Director of several orchestras and the founder of The National Typical Orchestra, he was also for twenty years the director of the National Institute of Folklore. He founded the International Foundation of Ethnomusicology and Folklore (now Centro de La Diversidad Cultural) in 1988 and donated the bulk of his estate to it when he died. He authored more than 20 works of Venezuelan folklore.

== Sources ==
- Luis Felipe Ramón y Rivera Biography

== See also ==
- Music of Venezuela
