= List of conflicts in British America =

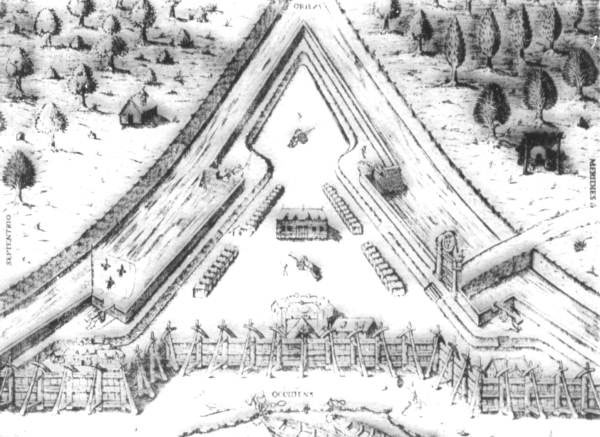
Fort Caroline

List of conflicts in the British America is a timeline of events that includes Indian wars, battles, skirmishes, massacres and other related items that occurred in Britain's American territory up to 1783 when British America was formally ended by the Treaty of Paris and replaced by British North America and the United States.

== 16th century ==
- Mabila - 1540 - Spanish colonization of the Americas
- 1565 Spanish massacre of French Huguenots at Fort Caroline in Florida. This is notable as it is the first conflict between European powers in what is today the United States.
- Anglo-Spanish War (1585–1604):
  - Raid on St. Augustine – 1586
  - Battle of San Juan (1595)
  - Battle of San Juan (1598)

== 17th century ==
- 1609–1613 First Anglo–Powhatan War
- 1622 Jamestown Massacre in which English settlers are attacked by Indians of the Powhatan Confederacy in Jamestown Colony in Virginia
- 1622 Indian massacre - Anglo-Powhatan Wars
- 1625: Battle of San Juan
- 1637 Pequot War in New England: Mystic massacre, Fairfield Swamp Fight
- 1637 Kent Island Rebellion in Maryland
- 1641–1667 First Beaver War in the Great Lakes region
- 1643–1645 Kieft's War in New Netherland
- 1644–1647 Claiborne and Ingle's Rebellion in Maryland; part of the English Civil War
- 1644–1646 Third Anglo–Powhatan War following Opechancanough's Massacre in Virginia
- 1655 Battle of the Severn in Maryland; part of the English Civil War
- 1655 Peach War in New Netherland (New Jersey, New York
- 1659–1660 First Esopus War in New Netherland
- 1659–1660 Fendall's Rebellion in Maryland; part of the English Civil War
- 1663 Second Esopus War in New Netherland
- 1664 Second Anglo-Dutch War in which the English conquer New Netherland and rename it New York and New Jersey (The war lasts in Europe and elsewhere until 1667.)
- 1673–1674 Third Anglo-Dutch War in which the Dutch re-capture New York, New Jersey, Delaware but return territory to the English after the war
- 1675–1676 King Philip's War in New England
  - 1675: Wheeler's Surprise, Battle of Bloody Brook, Siege of Springfield, Great Swamp Fight
  - 1676: Lancaster raid, Sudbury Fight, Battle of Turner's Falls, Second Battle of Nipsachuck Battlefield
- 1676–Bacon's Rebellion in Virginia
- 1677–Culpeper's Rebellion in Carolina
- 1683–Gove's Rebellion
- 1683–1701 Second Beaver War in the Great Lakes region
- 1689–1692 Overthrow of the Dominion of New England and Sir Edmund Andros; part of the Glorious Revolution
- 1689–1691 Leisler's Rebellion in New York; part of the Glorious Revolution
- 1689–1692 Coode's Rebellion in Maryland; part of the Glorious Revolution
- 1689–1697 King William's War; related to the Glorious Revolution and the Nine Years' War
  - 1689: Raid on Dover, Siege of Pemaquid
  - 1690: Schenectady massacre, Raid on Salmon Falls, Battle of Falmouth
  - 1692: Raid on York, Raid on Wells,
  - 1693: Battle of Wilton (New York)
  - 1694: Raid on Oyster River, Raid on Groton
  - 1696: Siege of Pemaquid
  - 1697: Raid on Haverhill

== 18th century ==
- 1702–1713 Queen Anne's War
  - 1702: Battle of Flint River, Siege of St. Augustine
  - 1703 Battle of Falmouth
  - 1704 Battle of Ayubale, Raid on Deerfield
  - 1706: Lefebvre's Charles Town expedition
  - 1707: Siege of Pensacola
  - 1708: Raid on Haverhill
- 1703–1719 Noncomformists Disturbances in Jamaica, New York
- 1703 Political factionalism riot in Charleston, South Carolina
- 1704 Riot of Young Gentry in Philadelphia
- 1705 Privateersman's riot in New York
- 1710 Boston Bread riot
- 1711–1715 Tuscarora War, Siege of Fort Neoheroka
- 1711 Cary's Rebellion in North Carolina
- 1711 Dutch Church Riot in Flatbush, New York
- 1711 Anti-impressment riot in New York
- 1712 New York Slave Revolt of 1712
- 1715–1717 Yamasee War
- 1716–1729 Natchez Wars, Natchez Revolt
- 1718 Riotous seizure of records in North Carolina
- War of the Quadruple Alliance: Capture of Pensacola (1719)
- 1719 Anti-customs riot in Newport, Rhode Island
- 1719 Overthrow of the proprietor in South Carolina
- 1720 Defeat of the Spanish Villasur expedition in present-day Nebraska by Pawnee (with the possible assistance of the French)
- 1722 Jailbreak riot in Hartford, Connecticut
- 1722–1727 Dummer's War with the Abenaki Indians in Maine and New Hampshire:
  - 1724: Battle of Norridgewock, Raid at Lake Winnipesaukee
  - 1725: Raid on Wakefield, Battle of Pequawket
- 1726 Philadelphia riot against pillory and stocks
- 1730–1738 Cresap's War (aka Conojocular War), border conflict between Pennsylvania and Maryland
- 1734 Riot against ship seizure in Hartford County, Connecticut
- 1734 Mast-Tree Riot in Exeter, New Hampshire
- 1736–1752 Chickasaw Wars:
  - 1736: Battle of Ogoula Tchetoka, Battle of Ackia
- 1737 Anti-prostitution riot in Boston
- 1737 Anti-markethouse riot in Boston
- 1737 Anti-Quitrent riot in North Carolina
- 1738 Fish Dam Riot on the Schuylkill River, Pennsylvania
- 1739 Stono Rebellion, slave rebellion in South Carolina
- 1741 New York Conspiracy of 1741, a suspected slave revolt
- 1739–1748 War of Jenkins' Ear with Spain
  - 1740: Siege of St. Augustine, Siege of Fort Mose
  - 1742: Battle of Gully Hole Creek, Battle of Bloody Marsh, Invasion of Georgia (Battle of Bloody Marsh, Battle of Gully Hole Creek)
  - 1748: Raid on Brunswick Town
- 1742 Philadelphia Election riot
- 1742 Battle of Galudoghson
- 1744–1748 King George's War (War of the Austrian Succession)
  - 1745: Raid on Saratoga
  - 1746: Siege of Fort Massachusetts
  - 1747: Siege of Fort at Number 4
- 1745–1754 Horseneck Riots, land riots in New Jersey
- 1747 Impressment riot in Boston
- 1750 Election riot in York, Pennsylvania
- 1751–1757 Anti-rent riot by tenants in New York
- 1754 Riot against the surveyor of the woods in Exeter, New Hampshire
- 1754–1763 French and Indian War (Seven Years' War and Sixty Years' War)
  - 1754: Battle of Jumonville Glen, Battle of Fort Necessity (Great Meadows)
  - 1755 Braddock Expedition (Battle of the Monongahela), Battle of Lake George, Penn's Creek massacre
  - 1756 Battle of Fort Bull, Battle of the Trough, Battle of Fort Oswego, Battle of Sideling Hill, Battle of Great Cacapon, Battle of Fort Oswego, Battle of Kittanning
  - 1757 Battle of Sabbath Day Point, Battle of Fort William Henry, including subsequent "massacre" Bloody Springs massacre, Battle on Snowshoes, Battle of Sabbath Day Point, Siege of Fort William Henry, Attack on German Flatts
  - 1758: Battle of Fort Duquesne, Battle of Ticonderoga, Battle of Fort Duquesne, Battle on Snowshoes, Battle of Carillon, Battle of Fort Duquesne, Battle of Fort Ligonier
  - 1759 Conquest of New France: Battle of Fort Niagara, Battle of La Belle-Famille, Battle of Ticonderoga
  - 1760 Anglo-Cherokee War: Siege of Fort Loudoun, Battle of Fort Dobbs, Battle of Fort Prince George, Battle of Echoee
  - 1760 – Conquest of New France: Battle of the Thousand Islands
- 1757 Riot against the recruitment of troops in Brentwood, New Hampshire
- 1757 Seizure of longboat of HMS Enterprise by mob in Portsmouth, New Hampshire
- 1758–1761 Cherokee War in Georgia
- 1759 Anti-land tax riot in North Carolina
- 1770 Battle of Golden Hill
- 1763-1764 Pontiac's Rebellion:
  - 1763: Siege of Fort Detroit, Siege of Fort Pitt, Battle of Bloody Run, Battle of Bushy Run, Battle of Devil's Hole
  - 1764: Enoch Brown school massacre
- 1763–1764 Paxton Boys' Rebellion in Pennsylvania
- 1763 Wyoming Valley Massacre against Connecticut settlers in Pennsylvania, Battle of Wyoming
- 1764 Pope Day Riot in Boston
- 1765 Stamp Act riots in Boston, Rhode Island, Connecticut, New York, and Maryland
- 1765–1771 War of the Regulation
  - 1771: Battle at the Yadkin River in North Carolina, Battle of Alamance which was also fought in North Carolina
- 1766 Quartering Act riot in New York
- 1769–1771 First Pennamite War between settlers from Connecticut and Pennsylvania in Wyoming Valley of Pennsylvania
- 1770 Boston Massacre
- 1772 Burning of the customs schooner HMS Gaspee in Narragansett Bay
- 1773–1774 Lord Dunmore's War
- 1775–1783 American Revolutionary War, see List of American Revolutionary War battles

== See also ==
- List of conflicts in the United States
- Classification of indigenous peoples of the Americas
