= Manuel de Montiano =

Spanish general and colonial administrator

Royal Governor of La Florida
- In office April 29, 1737 – 8 Aug 1749
- Monarch: Philip V
- Preceded by: Manuel Joseph de Justís
- Succeeded by: Melchor de Navarrete

Royal Governor of Panama
- In office 1749–1758
- Monarch: Ferdinand VI
- Preceded by: Dionisio de Alcedo
- Succeeded by: Antonio de Guill y Gonzaga

Personal details
- Born: January 6, 1685 Bilbao, Spain
- Died: January 7, 1762 (aged 77) Madrid, Spain
- Spouse: Gregoria Josefa Aguiar
- Profession: Lieutenant General

Manuel Joaquín de Montiano y Sopelana (January 6, 1685 – January 7, 1762) was a Spanish General and colonial administrator who served as Royal Governor of La Florida during Florida's First Spanish Period and as Royal Governor of Panama. He defended Florida from an attack by British forces in 1740 and launched his own unsuccessful Invasion of Georgia during the War of Jenkins' Ear.

== Early life ==
Montiano was born in the city of Bilbao, in Biscay, northern Spain. He was a relative of Agustín de Montiano, a dramatist and noted historian who founded the Real Academia de la Historia in 1735 and became its first director.

While still a young man, Montiano joined the Royal Spanish Army, and served for three years in the Aragon Regiment. From there he was transferred to Darién in Panama. By 1719, he was a captain of grenadiers and was sent to Oran, in what is now Algeria, where he fought in the defence of the city against the Arabs.

== Governor of Florida ==
On April 29, 1737, Montiano was named Governor of La Florida. Shortly after his taking office he wrote to the Governor of Cuba notifying him of a forthcoming British invasion, and requested supplies to ward off the danger. On March 15, 1738, Governor Montiano established Fort Gracia Real de Santa Teresa de Mosé as a fortified town for blacks who had escaped enslavement in the Carolina Colony to whom Montiano granted citizenship and freedom in return for their serving in the militia and professing belief in "the True Faith", Roman Catholicism. It became the first free black settlement legally sanctioned in North America as well as a haven for fugitive slaves from the colonies of North and South Carolina. Here the freedmen would cultivate the ground and learn the Catholic faith. However, following the murder of some inhabitants at the fort by Indian allies of the British, Montiano ordered it abandoned and its inhabitants resettled in St. Augustine.

=== War of Jenkins' Ear ===
Tensions between Great Britain and Spain had been on the rise for years, and on October 30, 1739, Great Britain declared war on Spain. The War of Jenkins' Ear was fought as part of a larger conflict, the War of Austrian Succession. The name comes from an incident involving one Robert Jenkins’ ear. Jenkins was the captain of the brig Rebecca in 1731. By the Treaty of Seville, Britain was barred from trading with Spain's colonies in the new world. However, smugglers could make a nice profit if they managed to avoid the Spanish coast guard. Jenkins wasn't a skilled enough captain to avoid the guard, so his ship was boarded by Spanish sailors from La Isabela and he was punished by having his ear cut off.

This war gave the Georgians under the command of James Oglethorpe a casus belli to attack Spanish Florida in 1740. Spain and England had been disputing ownership of the area in and around Georgia for some time when Oglethorpe brought the first colonists to Savannah, where neither country had established a permanent settlement.

=== British siege ===
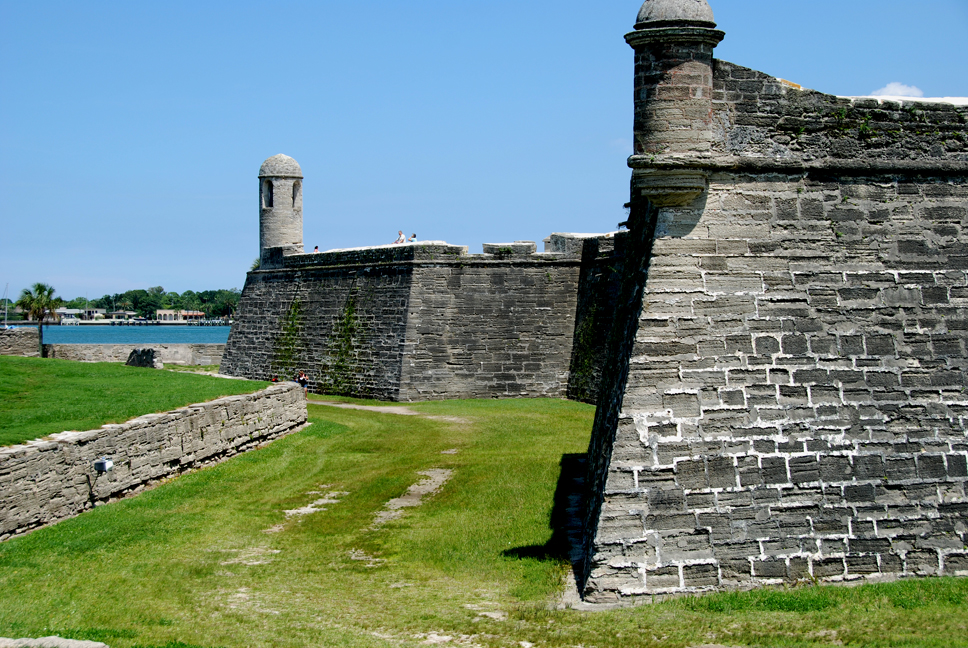
Castillo de San Marcos

As part of the war, Oglethorpe set out from the newly created colony of Georgia and invaded Spanish-held land. After capturing the Spanish outposts of Fort San Diego, Fort Pupo, Fort Picolata and Fort Mose, he marched his troops toward St. Augustine. On June 13, 1740, Oglethorpe began the siege of St. Augustine by blockading the city including the Matanzas Inlet, and the Castillo de San Marcos. Governor Montiano in the meantime had prepared well the defenses of the Castillo and the Spanish colony, by having all the inhabitants of the city take refuge inside the fort, while he held the British at bay.

Oglethorpe landed his troops on Anastasia Island across the inlet, where he placed troops and cannon batteries to fire on the city and the Castillo. He hoped that a sustained bombardment and blockade of St. Augustine would cause Montiano to surrender the city and fortress to the British. When asked for surrender, Montiano answered: "I will have the pleasure to meet you inside the castle...". The British artillery fired on the Castillo, but were unable to breach the coquina walls which were at the farthest extent of the British cannon range.

A small Spanish vessel managed to get through the blockade by evading the lone British ship guarding the Matanzas Inlet to the south of Anastasia Island and set sail for Havana, Cuba. On July 7, the courier which had been sent to Cuba returned to St. Augustine and told Montiano that six supply ships were at Mosquito Inlet, 68 miles farther down the coast. (Present-day Ponce de Leon Inlet). He also told Montiano that the British had withdrawn the vessel blocking Matanzas Inlet, and the way appeared clear to provision the city. However, an English deserter reported to the Spanish that Oglethorpe planned a night attack during the next six days of unusually high tides, for high water was needed to cross Matanzas Bay and assault the Castillo.

Six days passed and no attack came, so Montiano sent five small vessels down the Matanzas River, out the Matanzas Inlet, and on to Mosquito Inlet to fetch the supplies. Just as the boats returned to the Matanzas Inlet, they met two British sloops that were taking soundings. The sloops opened fire and took up the chase. The fighting continued until twilight when the British sloops returned to their squadron. Their withdrawal gave the Spanish flotilla the opening they needed. They promptly entered the Matanzas Inlet, sailed up the river, and safely anchored at St. Augustine, allowing supplies to be brought to the Castillo without opposition.

Oglethorpe had captured Fort Mose at the beginning of the war, but Montiano managed to recapture it at daybreak on June 26, after a battle that left 68 dead and 34 taken prisoner. The coquina walls of the Castillo withstood British bombardment without much damage. Fearing the approaching hurricane season, the British fleet decided to sail north for safer waters. With British morale low due to the broken blockade, the defeat of the British forces holding Fort Mose, the onset of hurricane season, a lack of naval support and knowledge that the city was now well-supplied, Oglethorpe raised the siege on July 20, 1740. On the morning of the 38th day of the siege the British withdrew their forces from the area.

=== Renewed hostilities ===
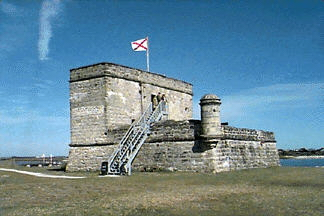
Fort Matanzas.

Montiano began the construction of Fort Matanzas in the fall of 1740. Coquina stone was quarried at El Piñon, a small inlet south of Matanzas. Construction was difficult, for long piles had to be driven into the marsh to support rising stonework. Repeatedly, the British and their Indian allies tried to stop construction.

On July 21, 1741, the British moved in to attack the Spanish. Two British ships, the sloop St. Philip and a schooner (a sailing vessel with two or more masts) sighted a Spanish sloop anchored inside the inlet of Matanzas. A Spanish galliot (a shallow-draft vessel propelled mainly by oars), which had gone unnoticed by the British, opened fire from long range but scored no hits. Darkness and fog soon halted the British attack. The next day the British again attacked. At 10 o'clock in the morning the St. Philip, now clear of the fog, moved in on the Spanish sloop. The sloop attempted to move away but ran aground on one of the many sandbars in the area. The British seized the opportunity and opened fire on the stranded ship. Several shots found their mark – two Spanish crewmen were killed and two were wounded. The Spanish galliot again saved the day by opening fire on the British ships, preventing them from taking further action. The St. Philip and her accompanying sloop were forced to retreat back to the open sea. If the British had been able to defeat the galliot, they would have captured Fort Matanzas.

=== Georgia invasion ===
On July 5, 1742, Governor Montiano mounted a counter-offensive with an army of about 5,000 men. He sailed to St. Simons Island, off the Georgia coast, through the firing guns of the British. The British had built two small forts on the island, Fort St. Simons and Fort Frederica. Oglethorpe abandoned Fort St. Simons after the Spanish forces had outflanked him, and retreated to Fort Frederica. Wasting no time, the Spanish took over Fort St. Simons the following day and soon began to scout out their opposition on foot. The two armies came face to face at the Battles of Gully Hole Creek and Bloody Marsh.

Early on the morning of Wednesday, July 7, several Spanish scouts advanced northward toward Fort Frederica to assess the landscape and plan their attack. They met a body of British rangers at Gully Hole Creek at approximately nine o'clock, and the two units exchanged shots. Oglethorpe learned of the engagement, mounted a horse, and galloped to the scene, followed by reinforcements. He charged directly into the Spanish line, which scattered when the additional forces arrived. Oglethorpe posted a detachment to defend his position and returned to Frederica to prevent another Spanish landing on the northern coast and to recruit more men.

During mid-afternoon of the same day, the Spanish sent more troops into the region, and the British forces fired upon them from behind the heavy cover of brush in the surrounding marshes. This ambush, coupled with mass confusion within the smoke-filled swamp, resulted in another Spanish defeat despite Oglethorpe's absence. This second engagement earned its name the Battle of Bloody Marsh from its location rather than from the number of casualties, which were minimal, especially on the British side. These defeats successfully repulsed the Spanish attempts to retake St. Simons Island.

In September 1742, Oglethorpe tried once again to attack St. Augustine. By this time Fort Matanzas was completed and fired its cannon. The British retreated without firing a shot. The next April Oglethorpe returned for one last try. However, heavy surf kept him from approaching the inlet or landing men and arms on the beach. Neither side fired a shot.

== Governor of Panama ==
In 1748, Montiano was named Governor of Panama, and promoted to brigadier general and field marshal as a reward for his deeds in Florida. Four years later he married Gregoria Josefa Aguiar in Havana, Cuba, who later gave him a son. He remained Governor until 1758. At the end of his term as governor, he was submitted to a residency trial, which found him an innocent and honorable person.

== Later life ==
In 1759 he moved back to Spain, where he retired and settled in Madrid. He was promoted to lieutenant general the same year. He died in that city in 1762, and was buried in the church of San Martín.

== See also ==
- Agustín de Montiano
- War of Jenkins' Ear
- Battle of Bloody Marsh
- Battle of Gully Hole Creek
- Castillo de San Marcos National Monument
- Fort Mose Historic State Park
- Fort Matanzas National Monument
- Fort Frederica National Monument

== Sources ==
- Arias, David (2005). Spanish-Americans: Lives And Faces. US: Trafford Publishing. p. 270. ISBN 9781412047173.
- Clark Hine, Darlene; Earnestine Jenkins (1999). A Question of Manhood: A Reader in U.S. Black Men's History and Masculinity. US: Indiana University Press. p. 576. ISBN 9780253336392.
- History of the Castillo de San Marcos
- Official NPS website: Fort Matanzas National Monument
- The War of Jenkin's Ear
- Why did England and Spain fight over an ear?

Government offices
Preceded by Francisco del Moral	Royal Governor of La Florida; 1737–1748	Succeeded by Melchor de Navarrete
Preceded by Dionisio de Alcedo	Royal Governor of Panama; 1749–1758	Succeeded by Antonio de Guill y Gonzaga
