= Invasion of Spain =

Invasion of Spain can refer to:

- Roman conquest of the Iberian Peninsula (218–19 BCE), the conquest of modern-day Spain by the Roman Republic
- Migration Period (c. 300–800), also known as the Barbarian Invasions, the loss of Roman territory, including Spain, to various invaders
- Umayyad conquest of Hispania (711–718), the conquest of modern-day Spain by the Muslim Umayyad Caliphate
- Reconquista (718–1492), long-term conflict between the Umayyad Caliphate and Christian forces.
- Peninsular War (1807–1814), the invasion of Portugal by Spain and France, and later of Spain by France during the Napoleonic Wars
- Louis XVIII's French invasion of Spain (1823), known in Spain as the Hundred Thousand Sons of Saint Louis

== See also ==
- Spanish invasion (disambiguation)
- History of Spain
