= Invasion of Georgia =

The Invasion of Georgia could refer to several invasions of either the U.S. state of Georgia or the country of Georgia including:

== Georgia (U.S. state) ==
- Invasion of Georgia (1742), part of the War of Jenkins' Ear when Spanish forces attempted to seize the British colony of Georgia
- an Invasion of Georgia during the American War of Independence in April 1778 by British forces, St. Simons, GA#American Revolution
- Battle of Chickamauga, September 1863
- Burning of Atlanta, September 1864
  - Battle of Peachtree Creek (July 1864)
  - Battle of Atlanta (July 1864)
  - Atlanta in the American Civil War
- General Sherman's March through Georgia during the American Civil War, November–December 1864

== Georgia (country) ==
- The 1921 Red Army invasion of Georgia
- The 2008 South Ossetia war which saw Russian forces invade and occupy parts of Northern Georgia

== See also ==
- Invasion of South Georgia
