= Agustín de Montiano y Luyando =

Spanish dramatist and historian (1697–1764)

The Most Excellent Agustín Gabriel de Montiano
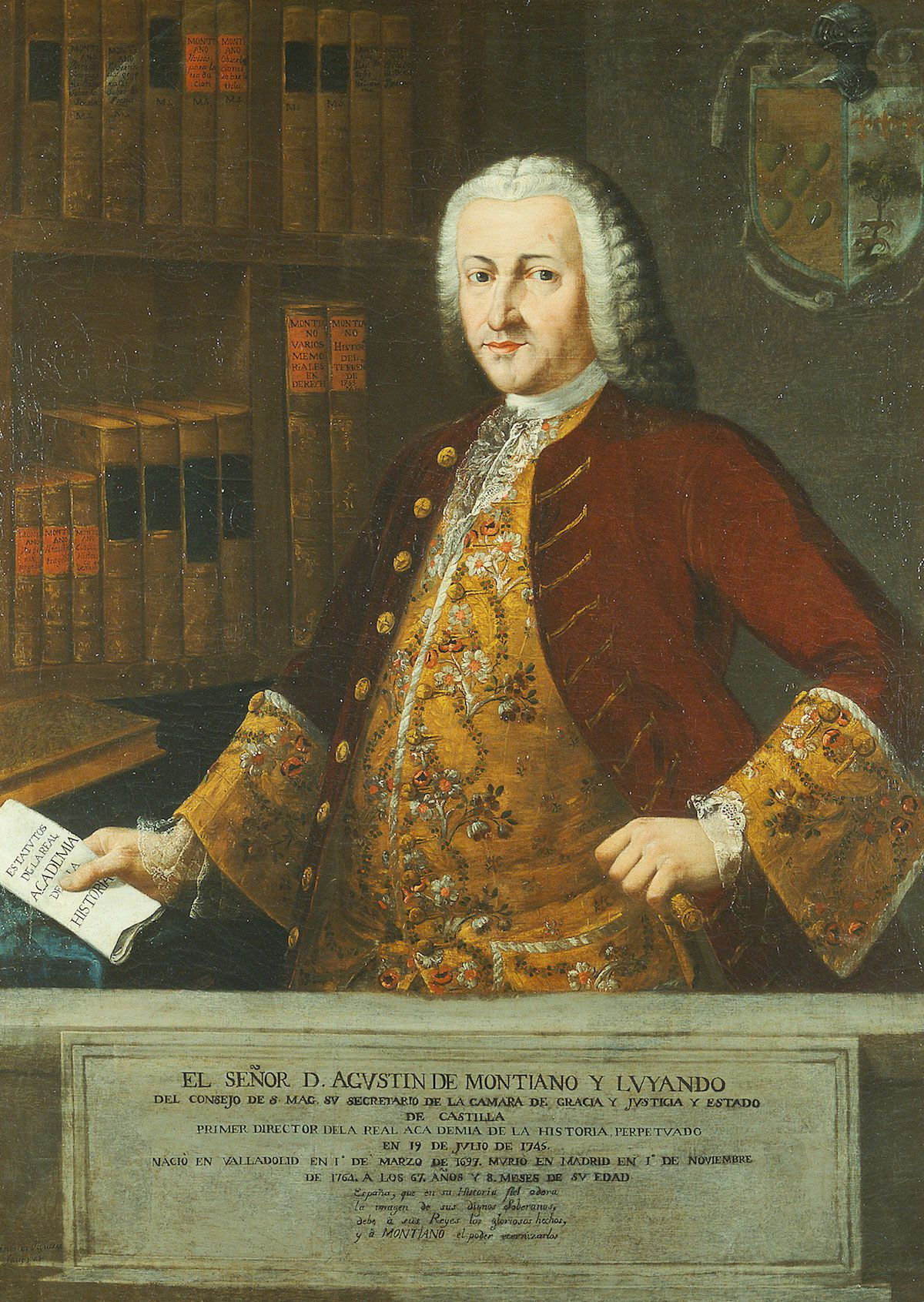
- Portrait (1765)
- Born: Agustín Gabriel de Montiano y Luyando; 28 February 1697; Valladolid, Spain
- Died: 1 November 1764 (aged 67); Madrid, Spain

Seat F of the Real Academia Española
- In office 30 October 1742 – 1 November 1764
- Preceded by: Carlos de la Reguera
- Succeeded by: Felipe Samaniego

Agustín Gabriel de Montiano y Luyando (28 February 1697 – 1 November 1764) was a Spanish dramatist whose work is linked to Neoclassicism. He was a member of the Royal Spanish Academy and was also a noted historian; he founded the Real Academia de la Historia in 1735 and became its first director. He was a Secretary of State of the Cámara de Gracia y Justicia (High Court of Justice) and King Councillor.

== Early life ==
He was a relative of Manuel de Montiano, Lieutenant General of the Royal Spanish Army, a defender in 1738 of the attacks by the English Crown to the Florida Peninsula, held by the Spaniards since the first half of the 16th century and later sold to the United States in the 19th century by the Spanish Crown.

Montiano was born in Valladolid. Orphaned in childhood, he was protected then by his uncle Agustín Francisco de Montiano, "Ministro de la Audiencia de Aragón", in Zaragoza, (the High Court of Law for the former Kingdom of Aragón subjects), learning Jurisprudence with famed Ecclesiastical Law and History professor Blas Antonio de Nasarre. But both uncle and nephew had to abandon the town to go back to Valladolid because of the battles between the would-be rulers of Spain during the Spanish Succession War, Felipe V of Spain and the Pretender Archduke Carlos de Austria. This stay was brief, the conquest of Majorca by Felipe V troops led to his uncle being sent as a "Presidente de la Audiencia" (Royal Court) to Majorca.

== Adult life ==
While in Majorca, he established a literary salon ("tertulia") at his home, which brought together young Majorcans who shared a passion for literary pursuits. These sessions were attended by the Count of Mahoni (O'Mahony), Colonel of the Irish Regimiento de Dragones de Edimburgo in Spanish service, as well as many officers from the garrison and other distinguished gentlemen on the island. He also wrote an Opera in 1719, "La Lira de Orfeo" and a poem in octosyllabes named "El robo de Dina" in 1727, dedicated to his friend Mahoni.

In 1727, uncle and nephew were appointed residents in Madrid, his uncle being "Fiscal of the Exchequer Council" and later "Fiscal of The High Court of Law". On his uncle's death he went to Seville, where, already seriously mentally ill King Felipe V of Spain, was living.

His deep knowledge of law, French and Italian called the attention of the then powerful Prime Minister José Patiño, being promoted to Secretary of the Joint Commission of Spanish and English commissioners, which discussed English–Spanish political relations and truces. When the Court returned to Madrid, Montiano continued in this role until the Commission concluded its work in 1735. The Monarch rewarded his service and loyalty by granting him a post in the "Despacho Universal de Estado", (the prime minister's office).

In 1734, he married María Josefa Manrique, daughter of Mariscal de campo and Governor of Cuba Diego Antonio Manrique (died 1735). His wife was a close friend of the Queen Consort and on 6 March 1737 he became a Member of the Royal Spanish Academy, becoming a Director on 27 April 1738, publishing in 1739, "Cotejo de la Conducta de S. M. con la del Rey Británico", which could be translated as "A comparison of the behavior of His Majesty against (the behavior) of the British King".

The ailing finances of the Society of History he founded and led, came in danger of closing in 1744, but on 25 October 1744, the already seriously mentally deteriorated King "gave notice" of his Royal Approval, after a plea and discussion with Montiano himself. No money was however available through the Spanish military efforts of those years in Poland, England, Austria and Italy, but in July 1745 Montiano was appointed "Perpetual Director of the Academy", for his lifetime and stressing the exceptional circumstances of this "lifetime" appointment, never to be repeated in the future.

Towards those dates he was a firm protector in Madrid of his young nephew Eugenio de Llaguno y Amírola, (Menagarai, Alava, 1724–1799), later notorious political and intellectual Basque residing in Madrid.

In 1750 and 1753, he published two books that attempted to demonstrate how the structural unity of Greek tragedies has been used consistently by leading 16th-century writers.

He was elected a member of the Imperial Academy of Sciences of Saint Petersburg, Russia, on 29 October 1759 by the President of the academy, Kirill Razumovsky, father of one of Ludwig van Beethoven's patrons, Prince Andrey Razumovsky.

He maintained literary correspondence with Louis Racine, (Paris, 6 November 1692 – 29 January 1763), the second son of the important French dramatist Jean Racine (22 December 1639 – 21 April 1699), and with Evrard Titon du Tillet, an author of The French Parnasse.

== Sources ==
- G. TIRRY y TIRRY, (Marqués de la Cañada) : Elogio fúnebre de Don Agustín de Montiano, (1765), 27 pages.
- CANDIDO MARIA TRIGUEROS, Elogio Histórico de Don Agustín de Montiano y Luyando y Juicio Critico de sus Obras, Memorias de la Academia Sevillana de Buenas Letras, II, (1843), pages 69 – 94.
