= Battle of Bloody Marsh =

Battle during the War of Jenkins' Ear

- Part of the Invasion of Georgia, War of Jenkins' Ear
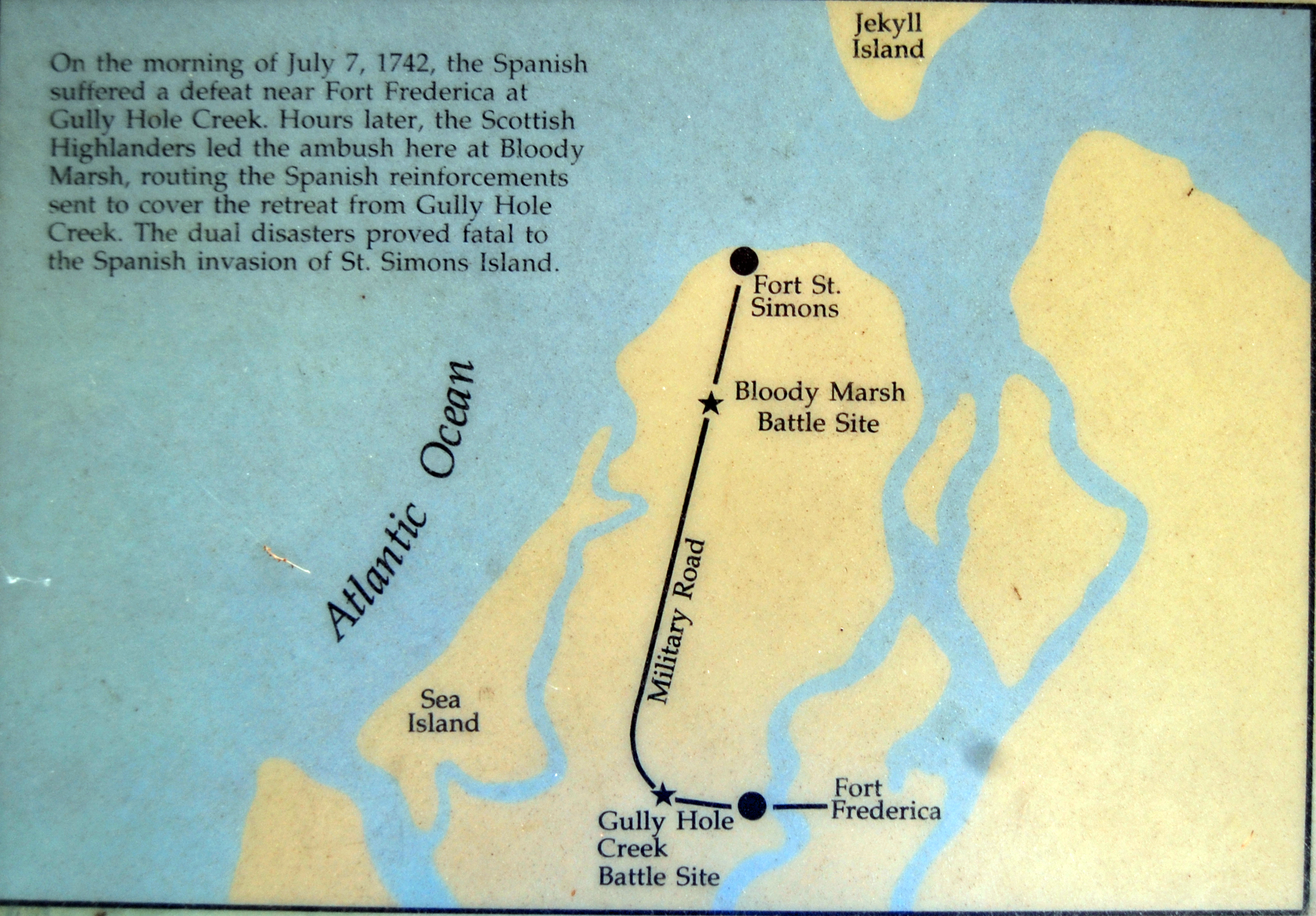
- A map of the Bloody Marsh area as it was in 1742 (north is down)
Date	18 July 1742 (new style)
Location	St. Simons Island, Georgia 31°9′24″N 81°22′47″W
Result	British victory

Belligerents
Great Britain; Province of Georgia	Spain

Commanders and leaders
(Kingdom of Great Britain) James Oglethorpe	(Spain) Antonio Barba

Strength
650 regulars, militia & Native Americans	150–200+ regulars

Casualties and losses
Light casualties	200 killed

The Battle of Bloody Marsh took place on July 18, 1742 (new style) between Spanish and British forces on St. Simons Island, part of the Province of Georgia, resulting in a victory for the British. Part of the War of Jenkins' Ear, the battle was for the British fortifications of Fort Frederica and Fort St. Simons, with the strategic goal the sea routes and inland waters they controlled. With the victory, the Province of Georgia established undisputed claim to the island. The British also won the Battle of Gully Hole Creek, which took place on the island the same day.

== Background ==
James Oglethorpe led the colonization of Georgia for Great Britain and had chosen Savannah as the principal port for the new colony. In the 1730s, Spain and Great Britain were disputing control of the border between Georgia and La Florida, where the Spanish had several settlements and forts. Given a heightened threat of Spanish invasion, Oglethorpe sought to increase his southern defenses. Accompanied by rangers and two Native American guides, Oglethorpe picked St. Simons Island as the site for a new town and fort. In 1734, Oglethorpe convinced the Parliament and the colonial trustees to pay for a military garrison at the fort.

The trustees also recruited a large group of colonists to settle St. Simons Island. The ships bearing the settlers and supplies arrived at Tybee Island early in 1736. From there, some went to the mainland while others traveled via periaguas (also known as pirogues) to St. Simons Island to found Frederica. The town and its fort were built on the elbow of the Frederica River to control approaches from both directions.

In 1737, Oglethorpe returned to England to acquire more funding and permission to raise a regiment of soldiers; he gained Parliamentary approval for both. He was appointed commander-in-chief of all British forces (limited as they were) in the colonies of South Carolina and Georgia. Oglethorpe subsequently recruited a company of Scots from Inverness, to migrate with their families to settle at Darien (briefly named "New Inverness") on the mainland, at the mouth of the Altamaha River. The men formed a military unit known locally as the Highland Independent Company. Official British records list it as Oglethorpe's Regiment of Foot. It was ranked as 42nd Regiment of Foot (old) in 1747 and disbanded 29 May 1749. Two forts had been constructed about five miles apart on St. Simons Island. Between the two ran a road the width of one wagon, named Military Road. This served to supply the garrison at Fort Frederica and settlers in the nearby village from Fort St. Simons.

The battles took place after a Spanish invasion of the island. They were part of the larger conflict known as the War of Jenkins' Ear (1739 to 1748). It derived its name from an incident in 1731. A Spanish boarding party had gone aboard a British brig Rebecca, off the Florida coast, and found that its captain Robert Jenkins was smuggling. The Spanish officer cut off one of Jenkins' ears for piracy. Parliament used the nearly forgotten incident to rally public opinion to their side in 1739, but the war was over trade and territorial competition between Britain and Spain. On October 30, 1739, Great Britain declared war on Spain.

== Invasion, battle, and aftermath ==
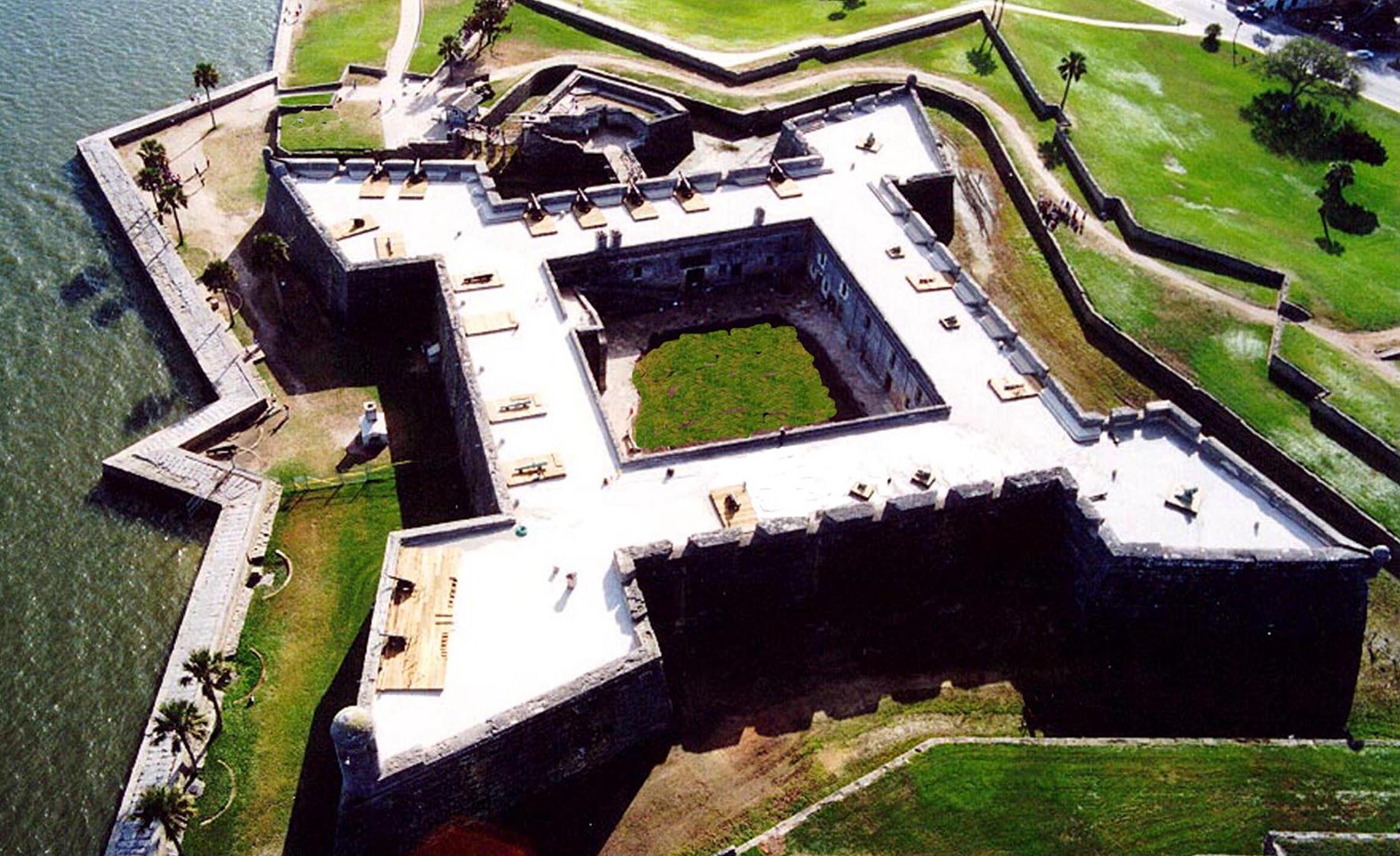
Castillo de San Marcos - St. Augustine. Stronghold of Manuel de Montiano

Spanish governor Don Manuel de Montiano commanded the invasion force, which by some estimates totaled between 4,500 and 5,000 men. Of that number, roughly 1,900 to 2,000 were ground assault troops. Oglethorpe's forces, consisting of regulars, militia, and native Indians, numbered fewer than 1,000. The garrison at Fort St. Simons resisted the invasion with cannonade but could not prevent the landing.

On the 5 July 1742, Montiano landed nearly 1,900 men from 36 ships near Gascoigne Bluff, close to the Frederica River. Faced with a superior force, Oglethorpe decided to withdraw from Fort St. Simons before the Spanish could mount an assault. He ordered the small garrison to spike the guns and slight the fort (doing what damage they could), to deny the Spanish full use of the military asset. The Spanish took over the remains of the fort the following day, establishing it as their base on the island.

=== Battle of Gully Hole Creek ===
After landing troops and supplies, and consolidating their position at Fort St. Simons, the Spanish began to reconnoiter beyond their perimeter. They found the road between Fort St. Simons and Fort Frederica but assumed the narrow track was just a farm road. On 7 July the Spanish undertook a reconnaissance in force along the road with approximately 115 men under the command of Captain Sebastian Sanchez. Near Fort Frederica, Sanchez' column made contact with Oglethorpe's soldiers, under command of Noble Jones. The British routed the Spanish, killing or capturing nearly a third of their soldiers. Oglethorpe's forces advanced along Military Road toward Fort St. Simons in pursuit of the retreating Spanish. When Spanish prisoners revealed that a larger Spanish force was advancing from the opposite direction toward Frederica, Oglethorpe left to gather reinforcements.

=== Battle of Bloody Marsh ===
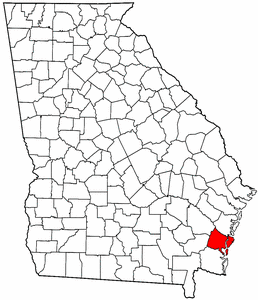
Glynn County, GA

The attack killed roughly 200 Spaniards. The ferocity of the fighting at Bloody Marsh was dramatic, and the battle took its name from the tradition that the marsh ran red with the blood of dead Spanish soldiers. The floor of the forest was strewn with the bodies of the dead and dying. A few Spanish officers attempted in vain to reform their ranks, but the Spanish soldiers and their allies fled, panic-stricken, in multiple directions as they were hit with volley after volley of musket fire from behind the foliage. Barba was captured after being mortally wounded. The battle blunted the Spanish advance and ultimately proved decisive. Oglethorpe was credited with the victory, though he arrived at the scene after the fighting had ceased. The fighting at Bloody Marsh was filled with confusion on both sides. The battle took its name from the British tradition that the marsh ran red with the blood of dead Spanish soldiers. The battle blunted the Spanish advance and ultimately proved decisive. Oglethorpe was credited with the victory, though he arrived at the scene after the fighting had ceased.

Oglethorpe continued to press the Spanish, trying to dislodge them from the island. A few days later, approaching a Spanish settlement on the south side, he learned of a French man who had deserted the British and gone to the Spanish. Worried that the deserter might report how small the British force was, Oglethorpe spread out his drummers, to make them sound as if they were accompanying a larger force. He wrote to the deserter, addressing him as if he were a spy for the British, saying that the man just needed to continue his stories until Britain could send more men. The prisoner who was carrying the letter took it to the Spanish officers, as Oglethorpe had hoped, and the Spanish promptly executed the Frenchman. The timely arrival of British ships reinforced a misconception among the Spanish that British reinforcements were arriving. The Spanish left St. Simons on 25 July, ending their last invasion of colonial Georgia.

=== Aftermath ===
In the ensuing months, Oglethorpe considered counterattacks against Florida, but circumstances were not favourable. The focus of the war had shifted from the Americas to Europe; arms, supplies and troops were not readily available. The region settled into an uneasy peace, occasionally punctuated by minor skirmishes. Oglethorpe was later appointed brigadier general. About 1744 he left Georgia for Britain, where he married an heiress; he lived in Britain the rest of his life. The Treaty of Aix-la-Chapelle ended the war in 1748 and recognised the status of Georgia as a British colony, formally ratified by Spain in the subsequent Treaty of Madrid. Its position was further secured in 1763 when Spain ceded Florida to Britain in an exchange of territory under the Treaty of Paris ending the Seven Years' War.

Wormsloe Plantation in Savannah annually commemorates the War of Jenkins' Ear.

On April 22, 1904, a bronze tablet commemorating the battle was installed by the Colonial Dames of America in the walls of the fort. Honorable Pleasant A. Stovall, of Savannah, Georgia, delivered an address.

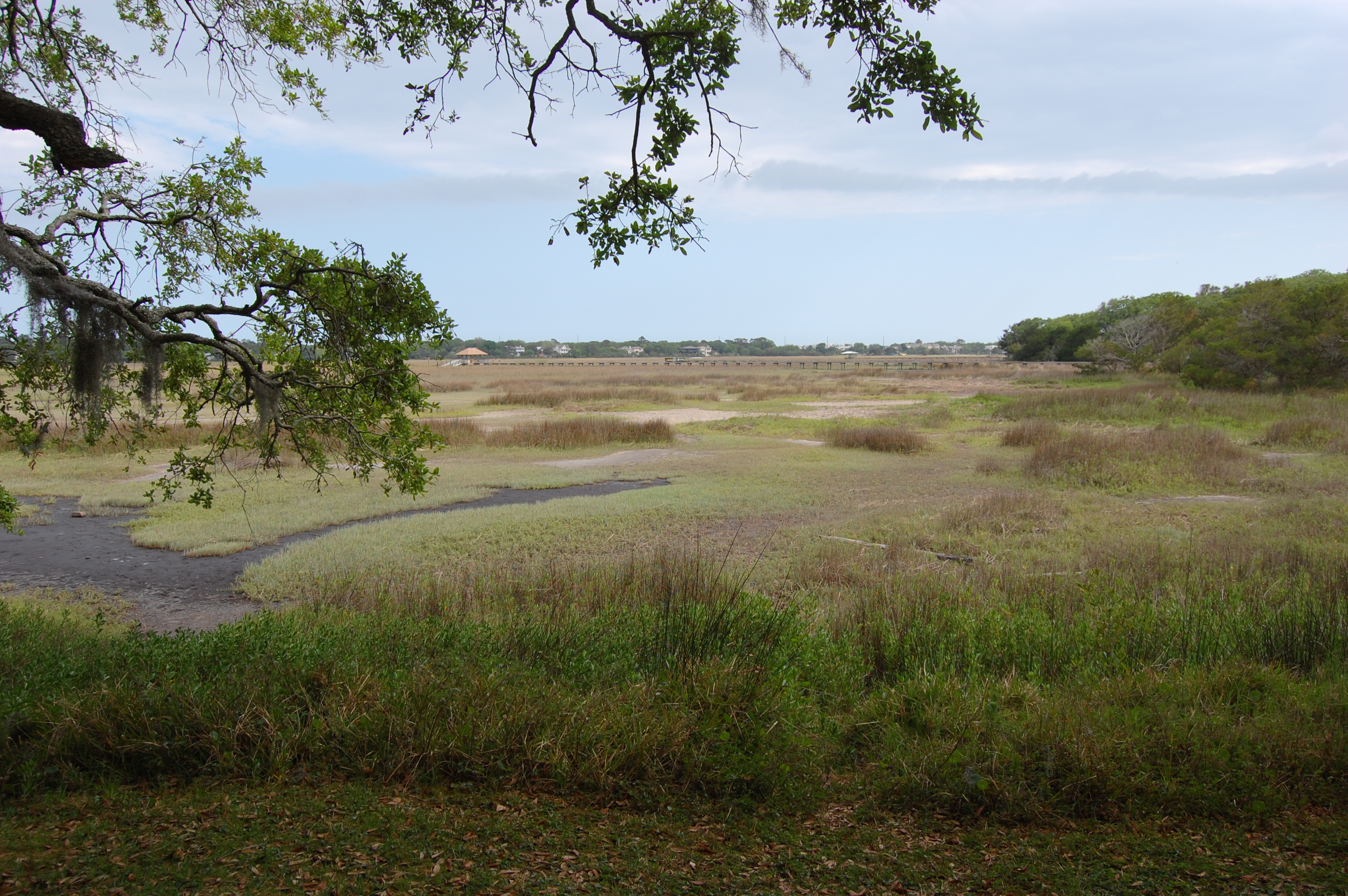
Bloody Marsh in 2008

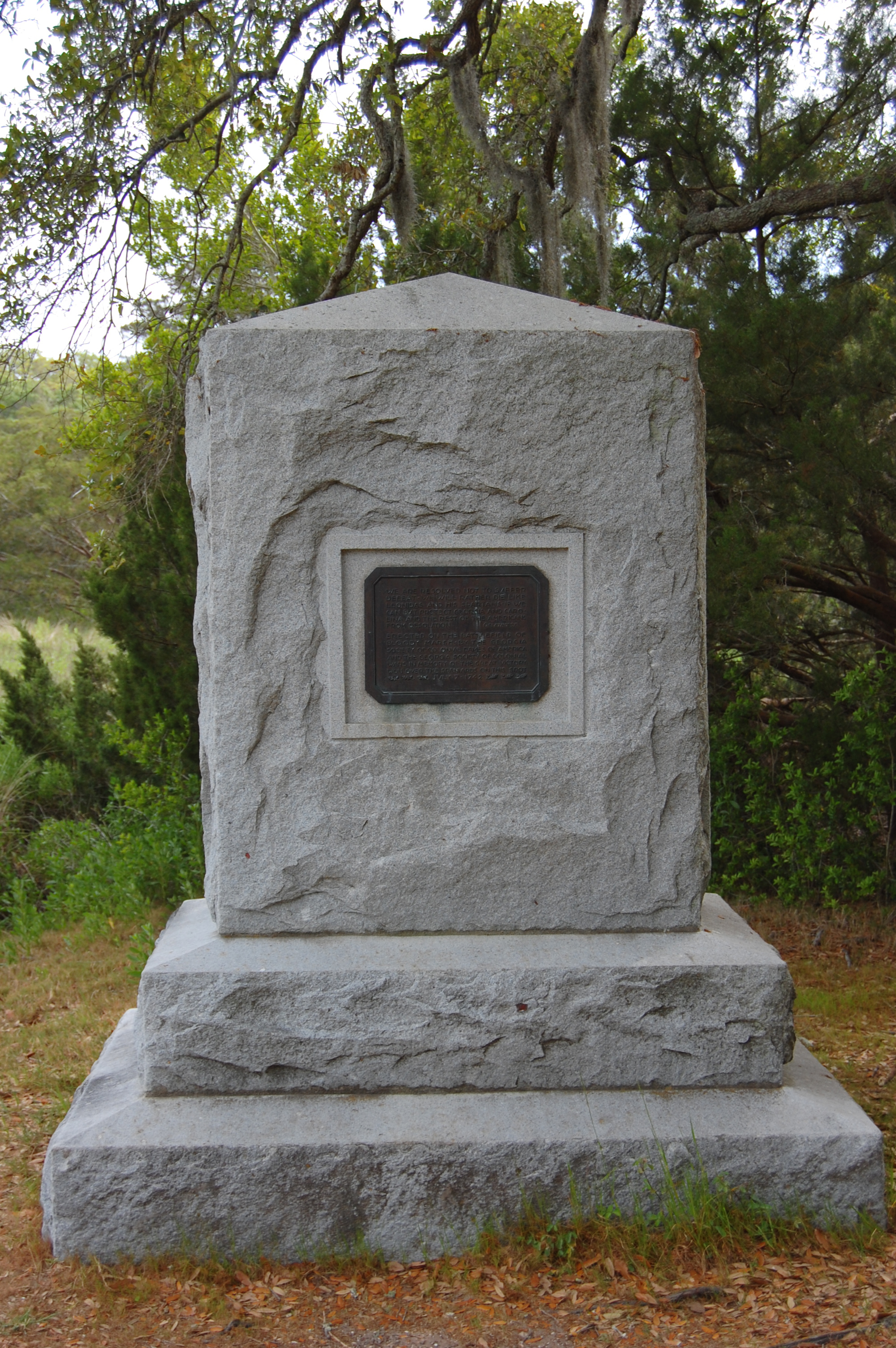
Bloody Marsh monument

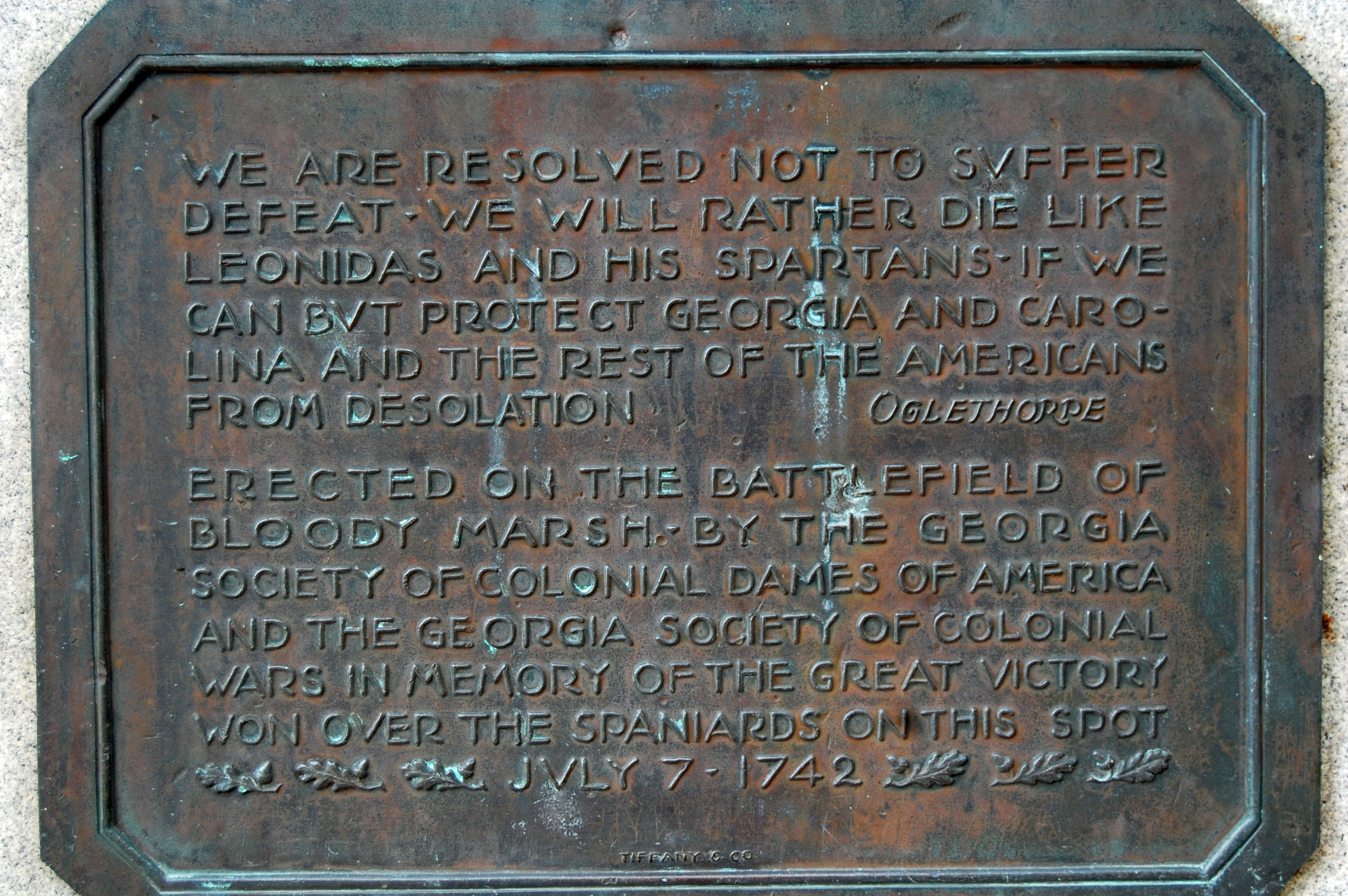
Bloody Marsh plaque, July 7, 1742 (Old Style)

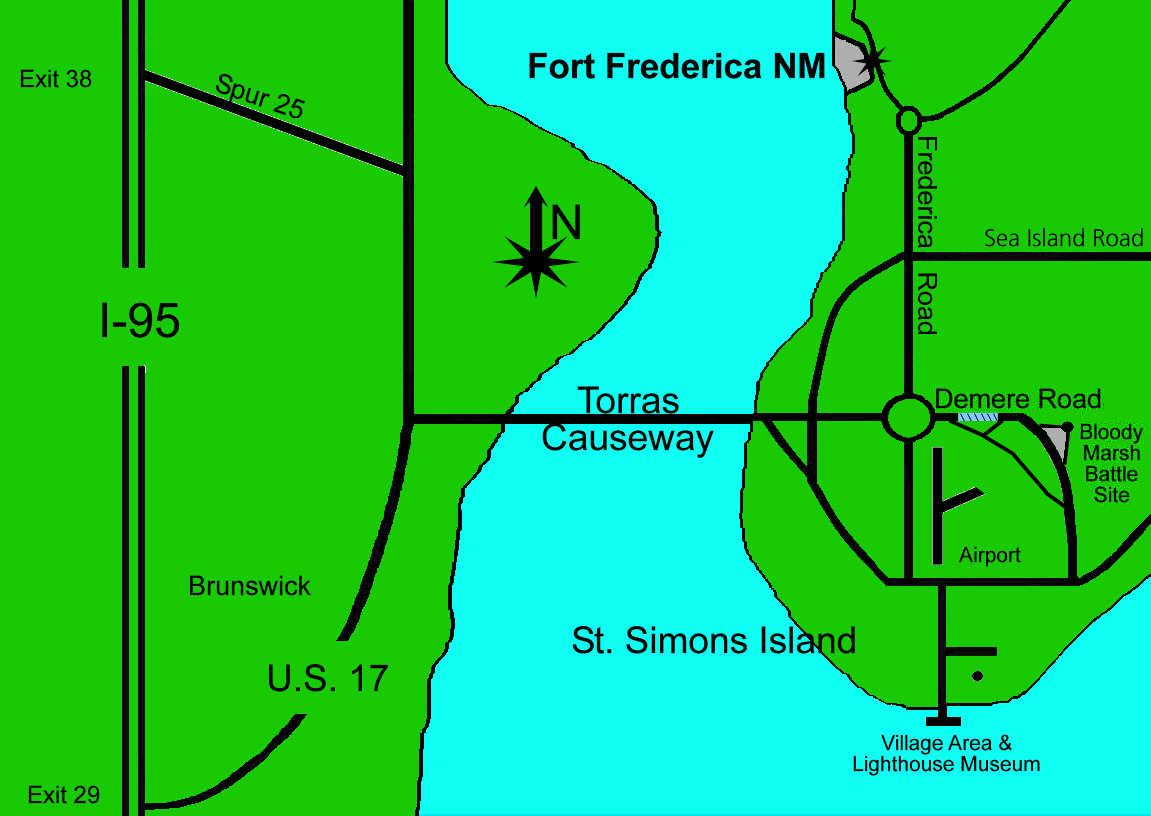
Modern map of the area

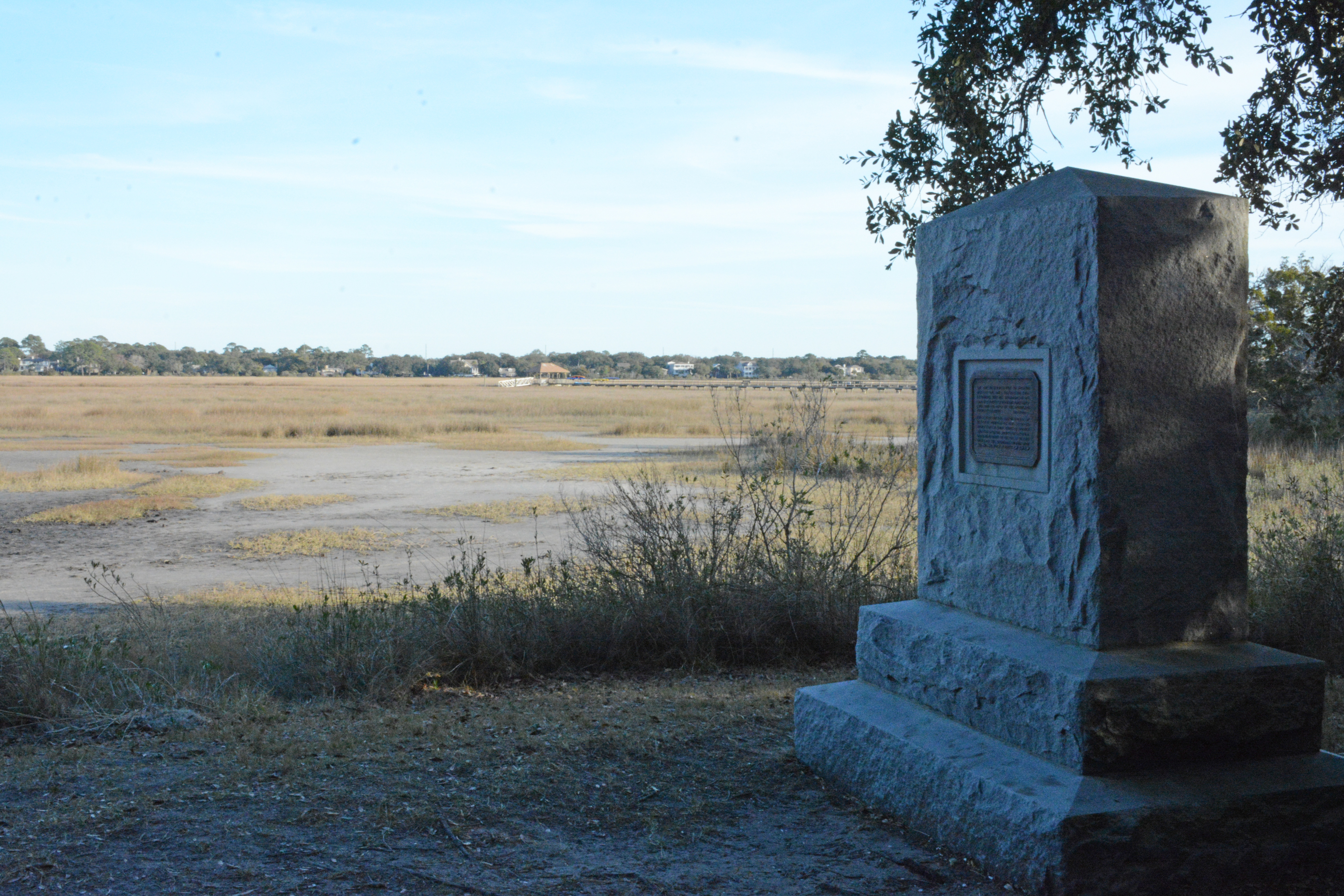
Bloody Marsh, with historical marker, 2015

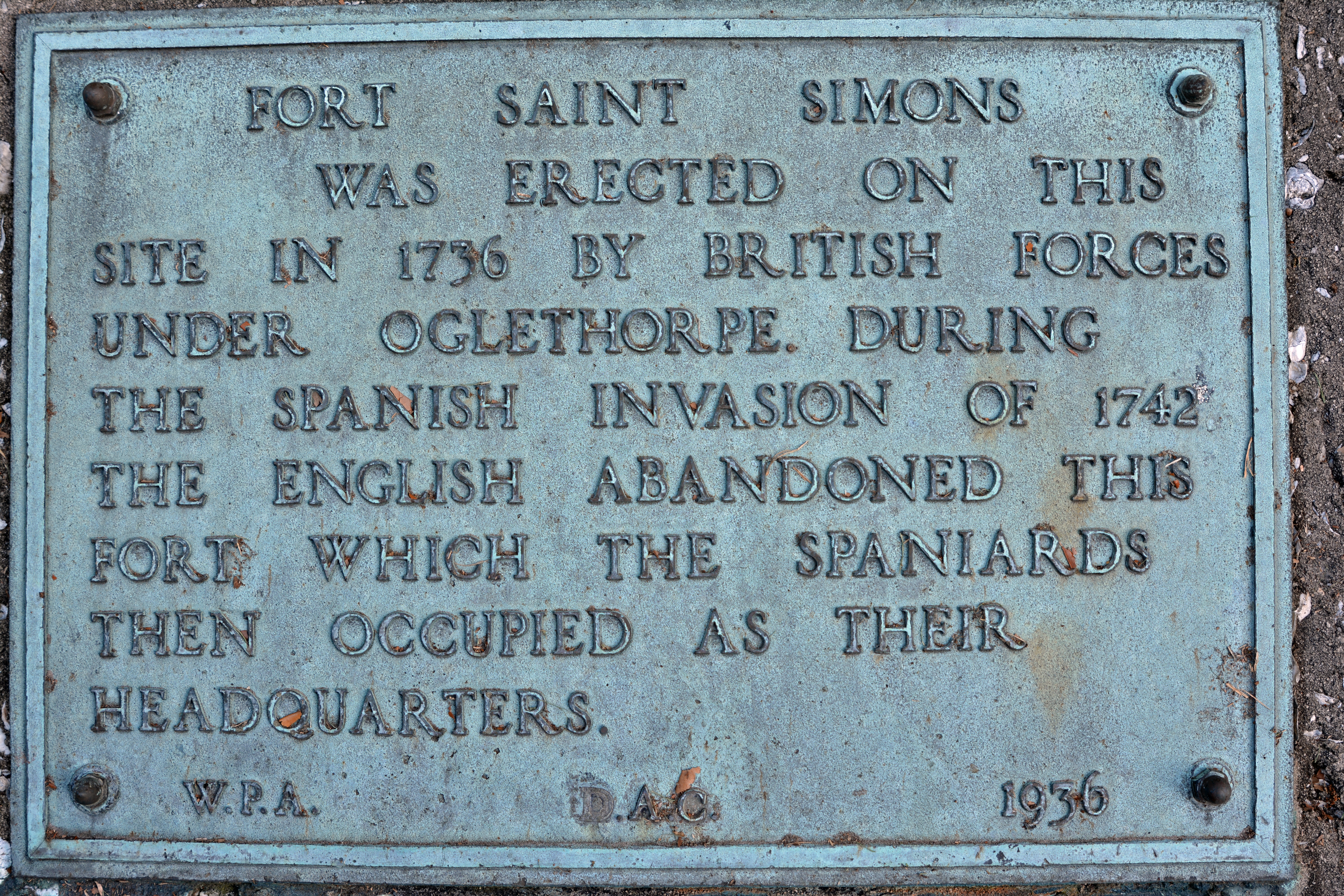
Fort St. Simons marker

== See also ==
- Fort Frederica National Monument; the Bloody Marsh Battle Site is a component of the Fort Frederica National Monument
- Invasion of Georgia (1742)
- List of conflicts in the United States
- List of Regiments of Foot (Oglethorpe's 42nd Regiment)
