= Candido Maria Trigueros =

Spanish writer (1736–1798)

Candido Maria Trigueros (4 September 1736 – 20 May 1798) was a Spanish poet, theatrical author and illustrated journalist.

He was born at Orgaz. After living out of Church appointments for over thirty years in Carmona, Seville, participating for many years in meetings of the "Real Academia Sevillana de Buenas Letras" and those organized by influent politician Pablo de Olavide y Jáuregui, and being appointed through pressures of his Madrid colleagues a Librarian, since 1784, at the "Reales Estudios de San Isidro de Madrid".

He participated then in a fluid exchange of ideas and correspondence with the foremost politicians, academicians, writers and historians of the late-18th century Madrid.

He developed works around, and/or, the French author Molière, no doubt by his contacts with Agustín de Montiano y Luyando, first director of the Spanish Academy of History and also a member of the Royal Spanish Academy. He was the author of his Apology read before the King Charles III of Spain in 1765 when Montiano died in November 1764.

He managed also to readapt with success some works of such great early 17th century writers as Felix Lope de Vega y Carpio and Miguel de Cervantes.

Trigueros died at Madrid in 1798.
