= Spanish invasion =

Spanish invasion may refer to one of the following historical invasions by Spain:

- Spanish colonization of the Americas, beginning with the 1492 arrival of Christopher Columbus and continuing for over four centuries
- Spanish invasion of Britain, a group of Jacobites and Spanish soldiers which reached Scotland and surrendered at the Battle of Glen Shiel
- Spanish invasion of Georgia, a military campaign by Spanish forces which attempted to seize and occupy disputed territory held by the British colony of Georgia
- Spanish invasion of Portugal, the principal military campaign of the Fantastic War
- Spanish invasion of New Granada, part of the Spanish American wars of independence in South America
