= Battle of Gully Hole Creek =

Battle during the War of Jenkins' Ear

- Part of the Invasion of Georgia, War of Jenkins' Ear
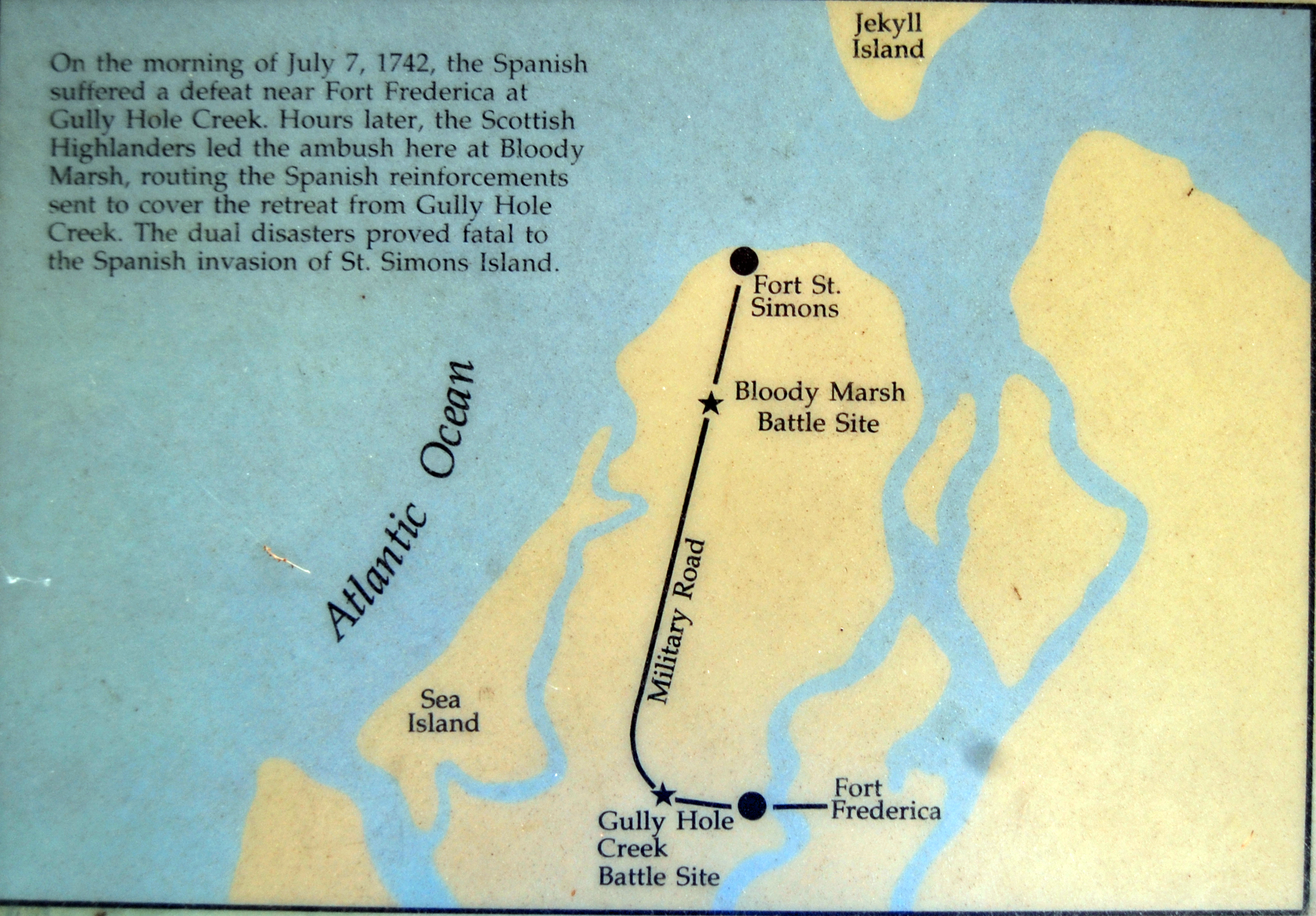
- Map showing the location of the battle. North is down.
| Date | 18 July 1742 (new style) |
| Location | St. Simons Island, Georgia 31°13′7″N 81°23′3″W |
| Result | British victory |

Belligerents
| Great Britain | Spain |

Commanders and leaders
| (Kingdom of Great Britain) James Oglethorpe | (Spain) Captain Sebastian Sanchez |

Strength
| 400–500 soldiers, militia and native Indians | 115 soldiers |

Casualties and losses
| 1 dead (heat exhaustion) | 12 killed, 10 wounded |

The Battle of Gully Hole Creek took place on July 18, 1742 (new style), between Spanish and British forces in the Province of Georgia, resulting in a victory for the British. Part of a much larger conflict, known as the War of Jenkins' Ear, the battle was for control of St. Simons Island, the British fortifications of Fort Frederica and Fort St. Simons, and the strategic sea routes and inland waters they controlled. After the victory, the Province of Georgia established undisputed claim to the island, which is now part of the U.S. state of Georgia. The better-known Battle of Bloody Marsh, a skirmish also won by the British, took place on the island the same day.

== Background ==
Spanish governor Don Manuel de Montiano commanded the invasion force, which by some estimates totaled between 4500 and 5000 men. Of that number, roughly 1900 to 2000 were ground assault troops. British leader James Oglethorpe's forces, consisting of regulars, militia, and native Indians, numbered less than 1000. The garrison at Fort St. Simons resisted the invasion with cannonade, but was not able to prevent the landing. On July 5, 1742, Montiano landed nearly 1900 men from 36 ships near Gascoigne Bluff, close to the Frederica River. Faced with a superior force, Oglethorpe decided to withdraw from Fort St. Simons before the Spanish could mount an assault. He ordered the small garrison to spike the guns and slight the fort (doing what damage they could), to deny the Spanish full use of the military asset. The Spanish took over the remains of the fort the following day, establishing it as their base on the island.

After landing troops and supplies, and consolidating their position at Fort St. Simons, the Spanish began to cautiously reconnoiter beyond their perimeter. They found the road between Fort St. Simons and Fort Frederica, but first assumed the narrow track was just a farm road. On July 18, the Spanish undertook a reconnaissance in force along the road with approximately 115 men under the command of Captain Sebastian Sanchez.

== Battle ==
A mile and a half short of Fort Frederica, their target, the Spaniards were set upon by a force consisting of Georgia Rangers, and the Highland Independent Company, aided by more numerous Chickasaw, Yamacraw and Creek warriors, all under General Oglethorpe's personal direction. After an intense but brief battle, lasting less than one hour, Oglethorpe's forces succeeded in killing or capturing 36 of the Spaniards, nearly a third of the forces in that group. Among those killed was second-in-command, Captain Nicolas Hernandez. Captain Sebastian Sanchez was captured. Oglethorpe's losses were described as "light".

The rest of the Spanish retreated in disorder back to the south. They were met by 200 Spanish grenadiers under Captain Antonio Barba, who had just marched from Fort St Simons and covered their retreat.

== Aftermath ==
The British colonists also won the Battle of Bloody Marsh later the same day, driving the Spanish out of the Georgia colony.

The War of Jenkins' Ear is commemorated annually on the last Saturday in May at Wormsloe Plantation in Savannah, Georgia.

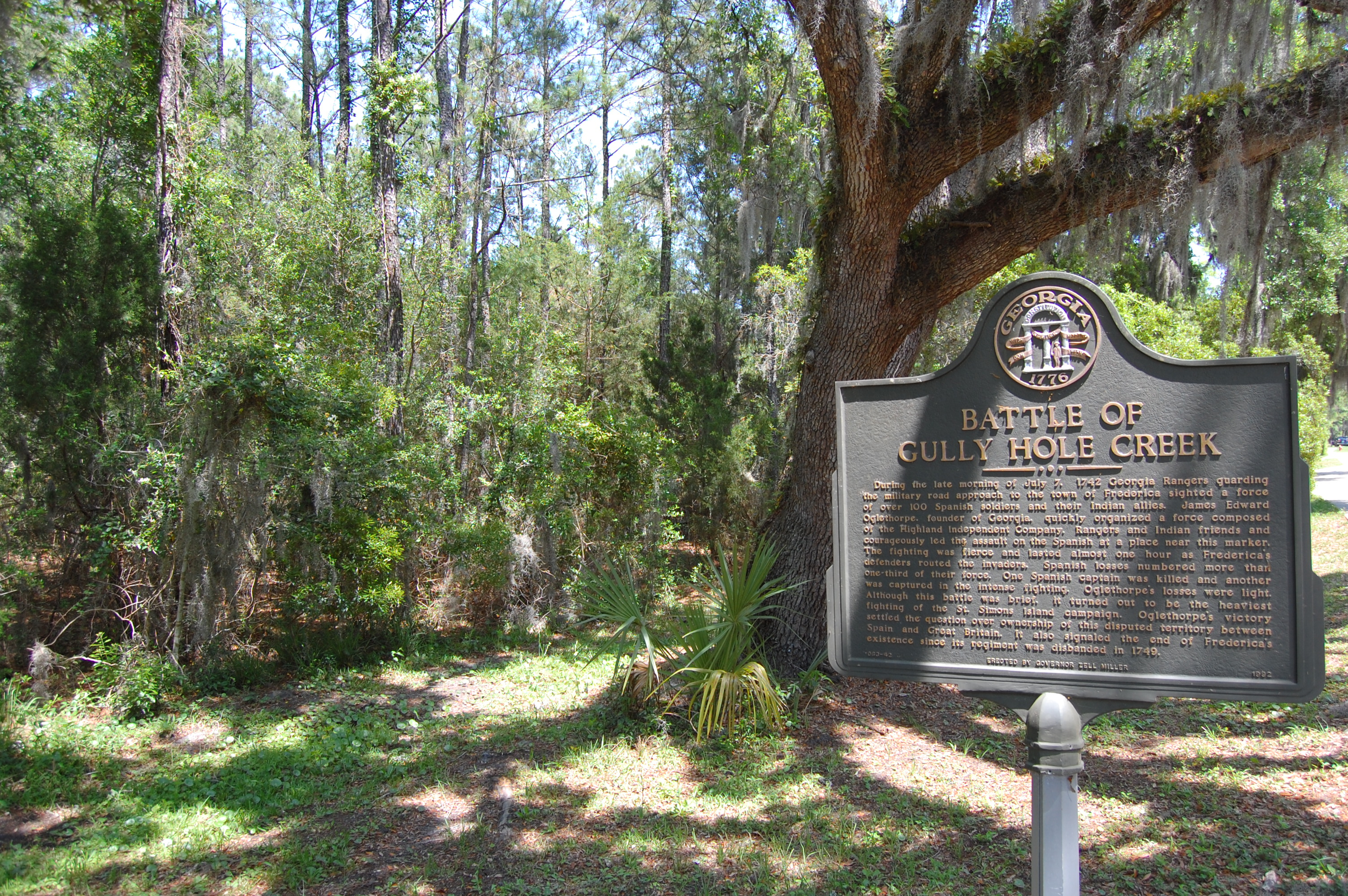
Gully Hole Creek area

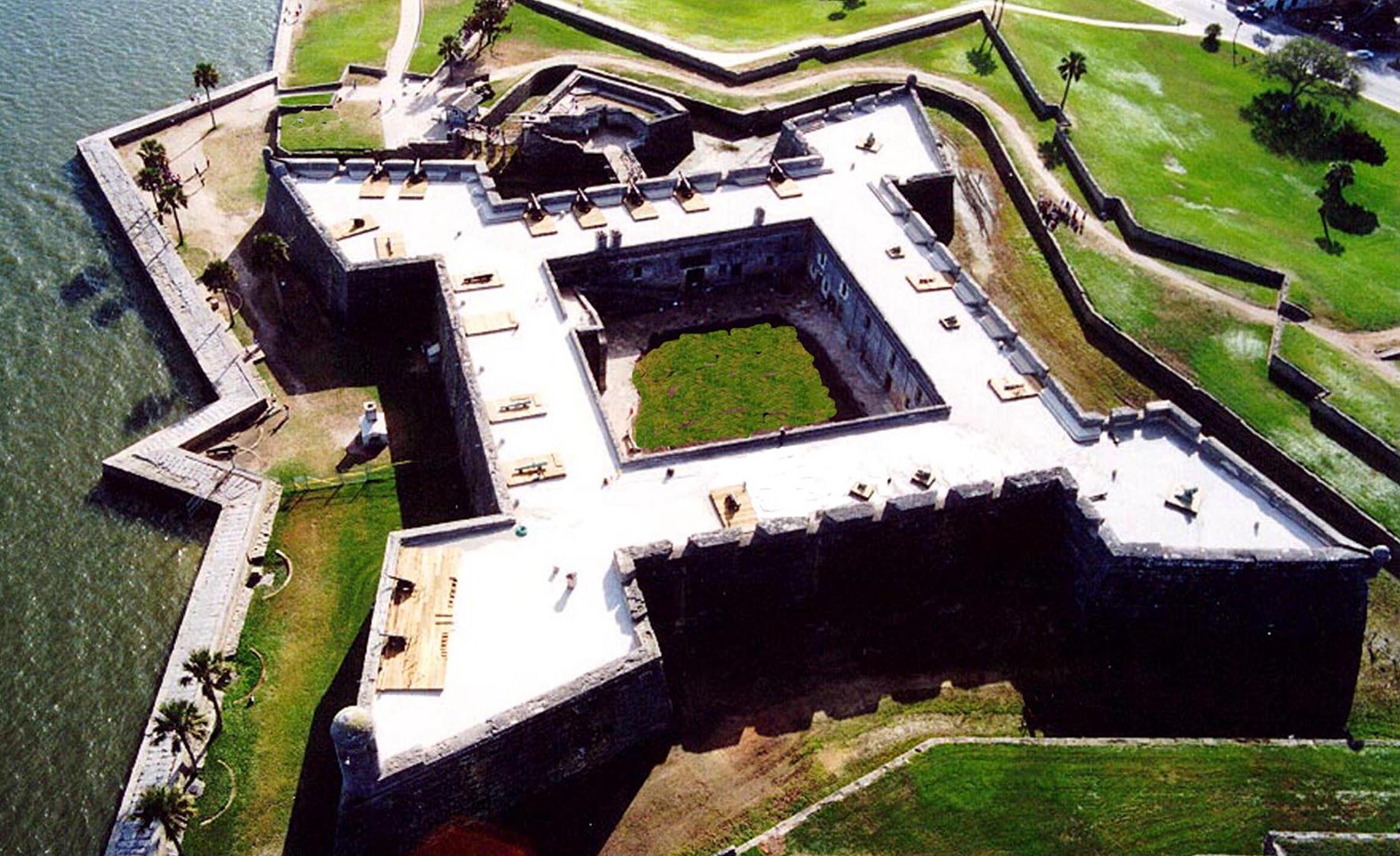
Castillo de San Marcos - St. Augustine. Stronghold of Manuel de Montiano

== See also ==
- Battle of Bloody Marsh
- List of conflicts in the United States
- Invasion of Georgia (1742)
