= Fort Frederica National Monument =

Monument in Georgia, US

- Location within Georgia Location within the United States
- Interactive map of Fort Frederica National Monument
- Location: St. Simons Island, Georgia, USA
- Nearest city: Brunswick, Georgia
- Coordinates: 31°13′26″N 81°23′36″W
- Area: 284.49 acres (115.13 ha)
- Authorized: May 26, 1936
- Visitors: 108,043 (in 2025)
- Governing body: National Park Service
- Website: Fort Frederica National Monument
- Fort Frederica National Monument
- U.S. National Register of Historic Places
- U.S. Historic district
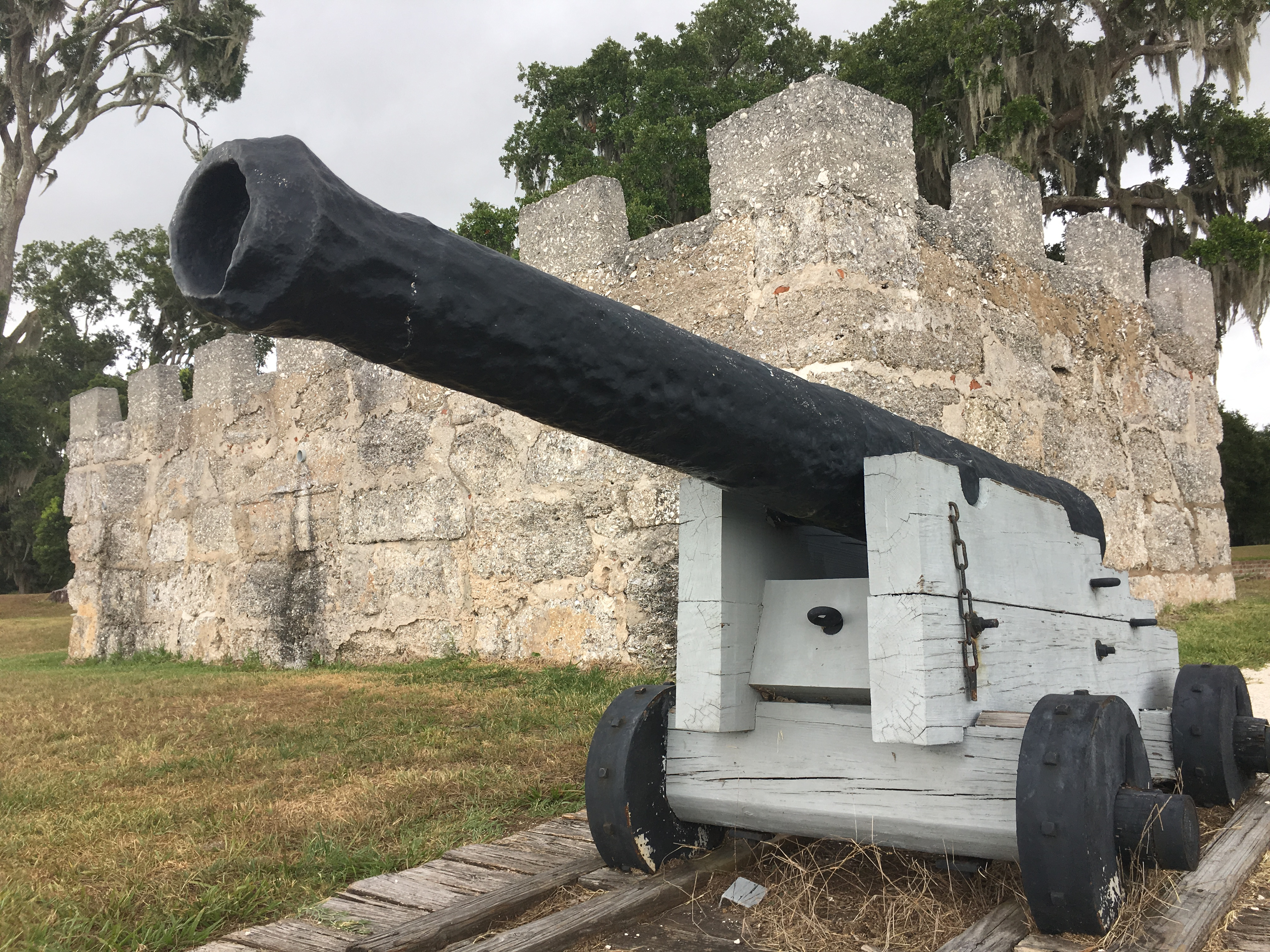
- Fort Frederica in 2020
- Nearest city: Brunswick, Georgia
- Area: 218 acres (88.2 ha)
- Built: 1736
- NRHP reference No.: 66000065 (original); 100005351 (increase)

Significant dates
- Added to NRHP: October 15, 1966
- Boundary increase: July 23, 2020

Fort Frederica National Monument, on St. Simons Island, Georgia, preserves the archaeological remnants of a fort and town built by James Oglethorpe between 1736 and 1748 to protect the southern boundary of the British colony of Georgia from Spanish raids. About 630 British troops were stationed at the fort.

A town of up to 1,000 colonial residents had grown up outside the fort; it was laid out following principles of the Oglethorpe Plan for towns in the Georgia Colony. The town was named Frederica, after Frederick, Prince of Wales, son of King George II, although the name was feminized to distinguish it from Fort Frederick in South Carolina.

== History ==
During the 1600s, the Island of St. Simons was the site of two Spanish missions. The land that would eventually become the site of Fort Frederica was at one point inhabited by members of the Guale, who sided with the Spanish, yet due to aggression by the English and their Native American allies, the island was abandoned by 1683. In the early 18th century, Europeans called the land lying between British South Carolina and Spanish Florida the "Debatable Land". After the philanthropist James Oglethorpe founded the colony of Georgia in 1733 to provide a place where poor debtors could settle, colonists from England and Scotland, as well as refugees from the Electorate of the Palatinate, built Fort Frederica in 1736 to defend their new territory. The site is also notable as the home of John Wesley, founder of the Methodist Church, during several brief periods between 1736 and 1737. His brother, Charles Wesley, was the minister of the fort between March and May of 1736, before leaving in part due to a poor relationship with Oglethorpe and the settlers.

In the 1742 battles of Bloody Marsh and Gully Hole Creek, forces under Oglethorpe successfully repulsed Spanish attempts to invade St. Simons Island. Afterward, the Spanish no longer threatened the colony; in 1749, the government disbanded the garrison at Frederica. Soon, the village fell into economic decline, and by 1755, it was mostly abandoned. The town survived a fire in 1758, but after a few more years, it was abandoned. Naturalist William Bartram visited the site in March of 1774 and though it was in ruins, he noted that there was still a small garrison there.

Fort Frederica was documented and authorized as a National Monument on May 26, 1936, under the Franklin D. Roosevelt administration during the Great Depression. During this period, the Works Progress Administration (WPA) sponsored numerous surveys of historic areas and buildings across the country to identify, document and protect the resources for the future, as well as to provide employment.

Starting in 1947, the National Park Service and the Ft. Frederica Association, a citizens' interest group, sponsored a series of archaeological investigations at the Frederica site. Using information from 18th-century maps and journals as guides, the archaeologists excavated sections of the fort and village. By correlating the archaeological data with the historic documents and excavating remains of structures, the archaeologists have provided important insight into Frederica's past and colonial history, a complex time of international rivalries.

As a historic area under the National Park Service, the National Monument was listed on the National Register of Historic Places on October 15, 1966. Fort Frederica is open to the public, and admission is free.

"Fort Frederica, National Monument", a National Park Service pamphlet of 1960

"Frederica", a 1913 pamphlet detailing the history of the site

== Gallery ==
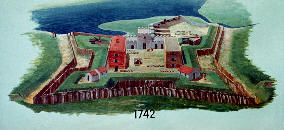
Historical layout of the colonial fort

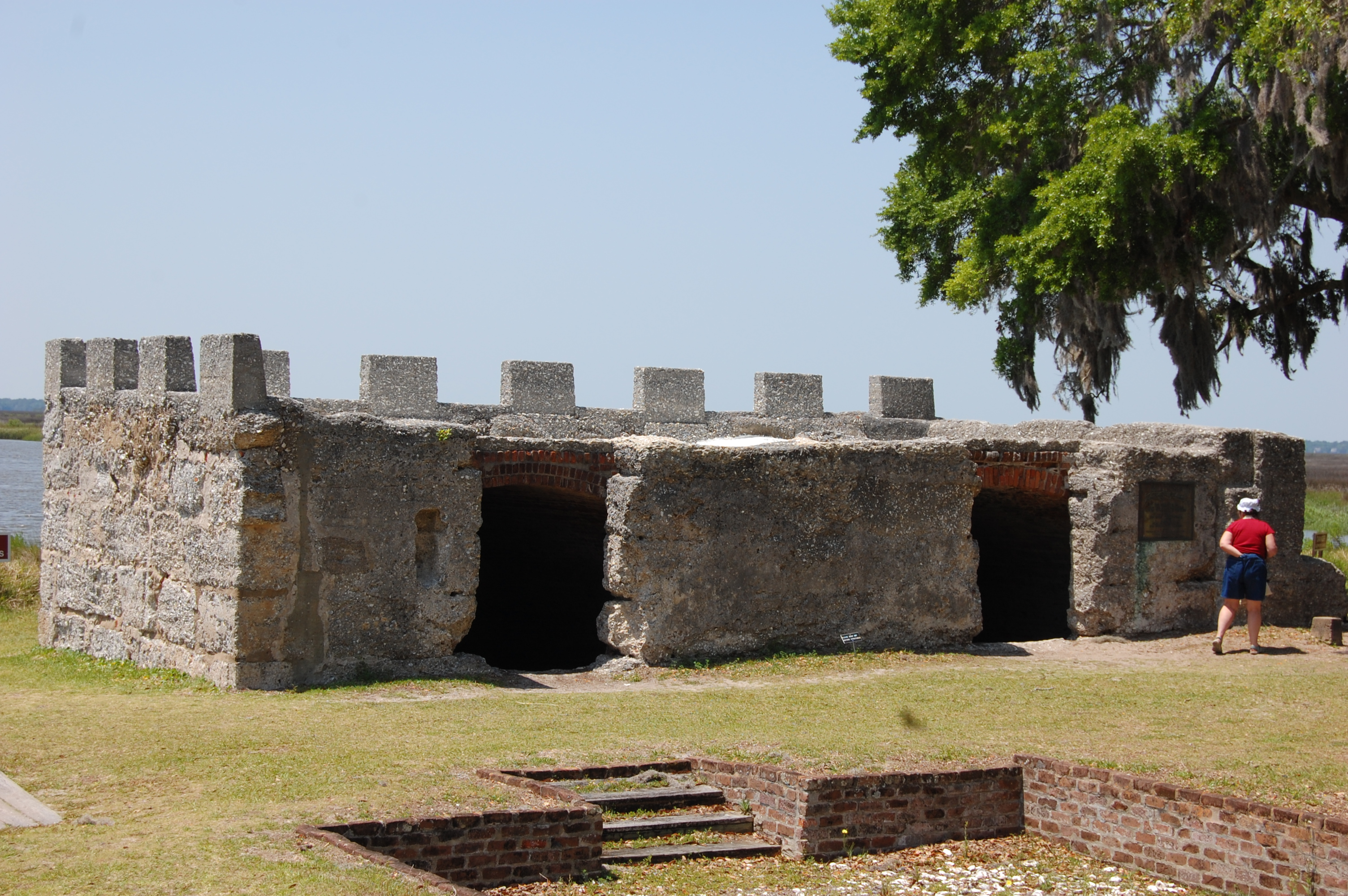
The magazine of Fort Frederica

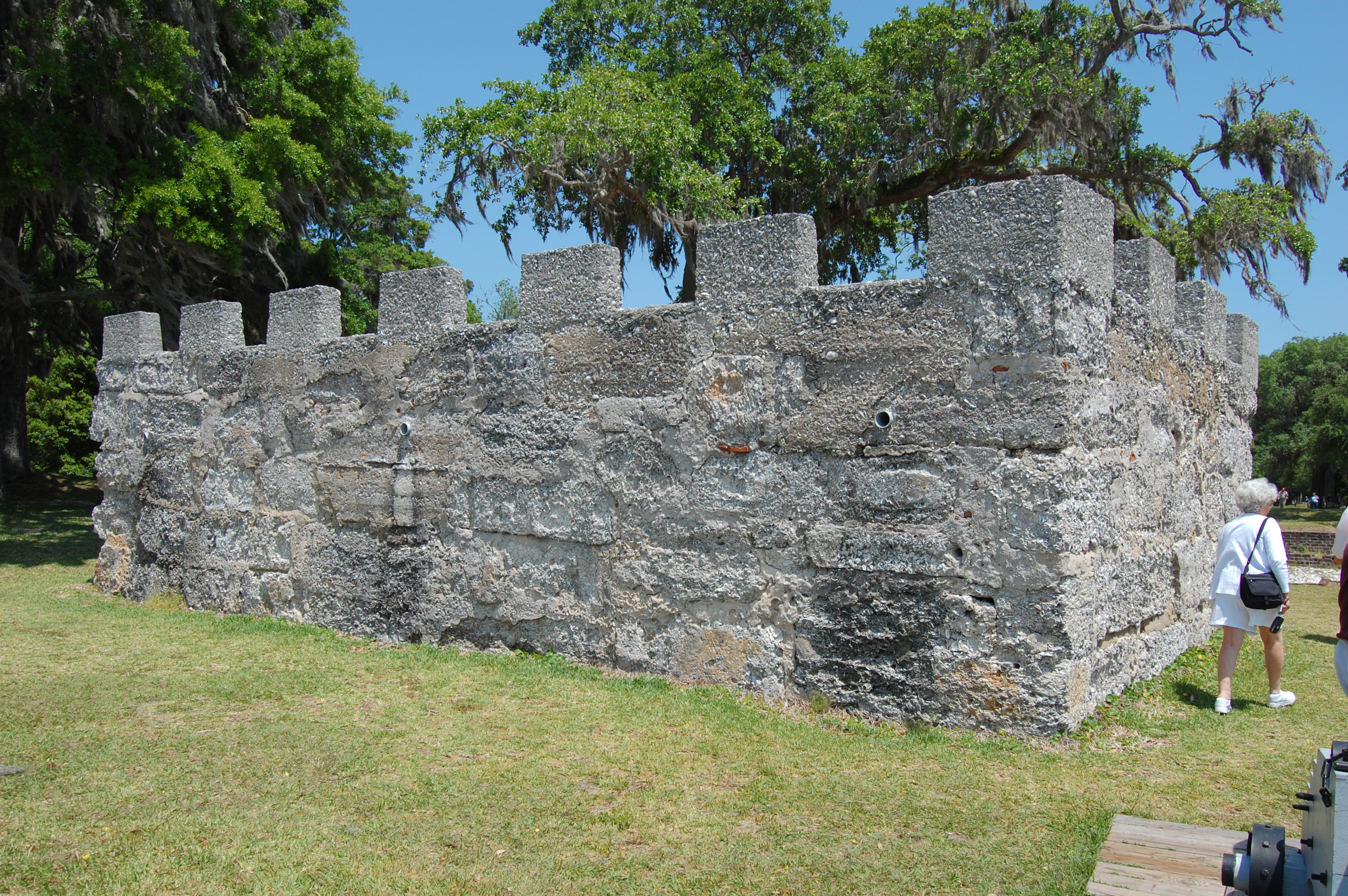
Fort Frederica on riverfront

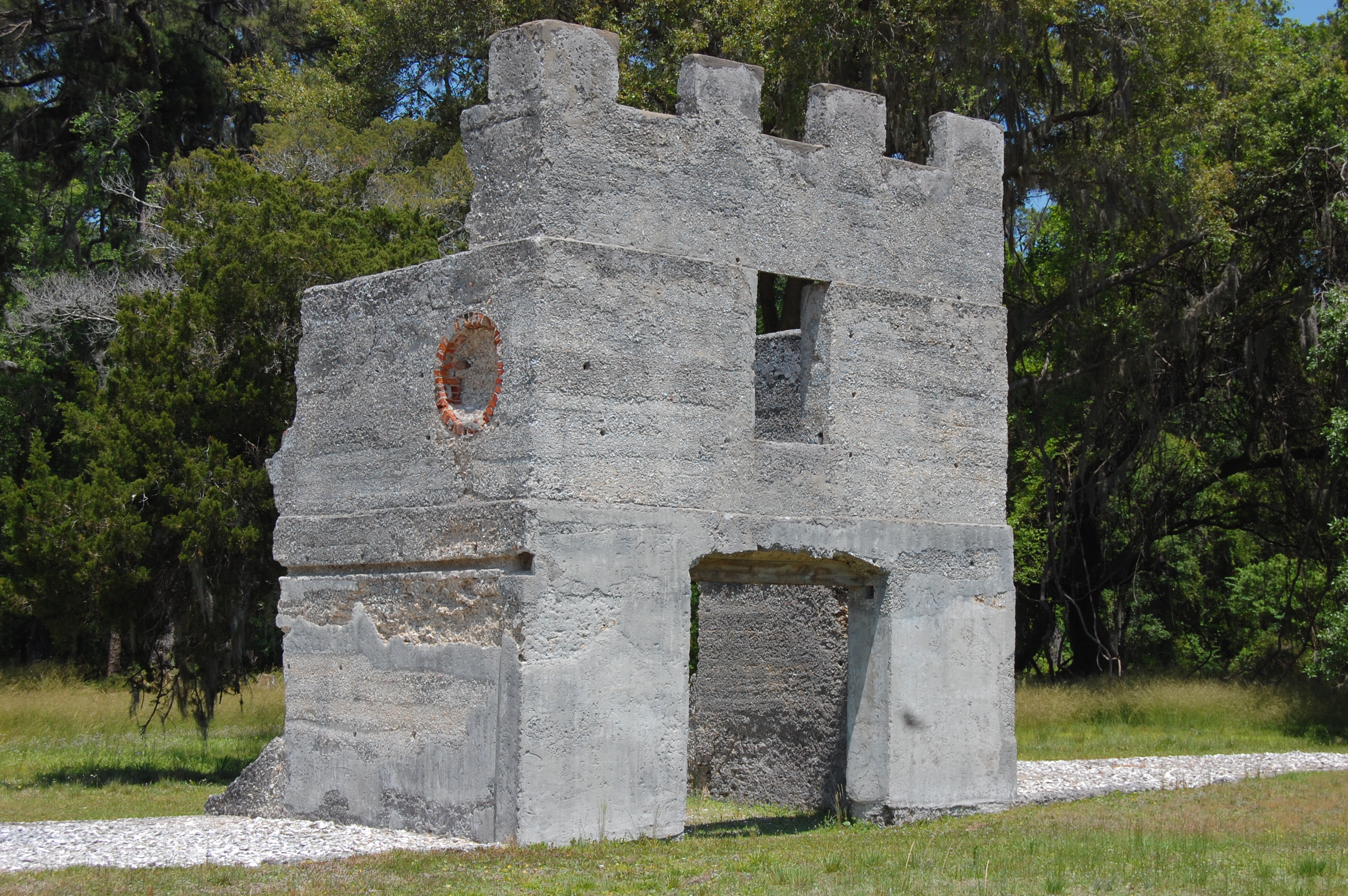
Remains of Fort Frederica barracks

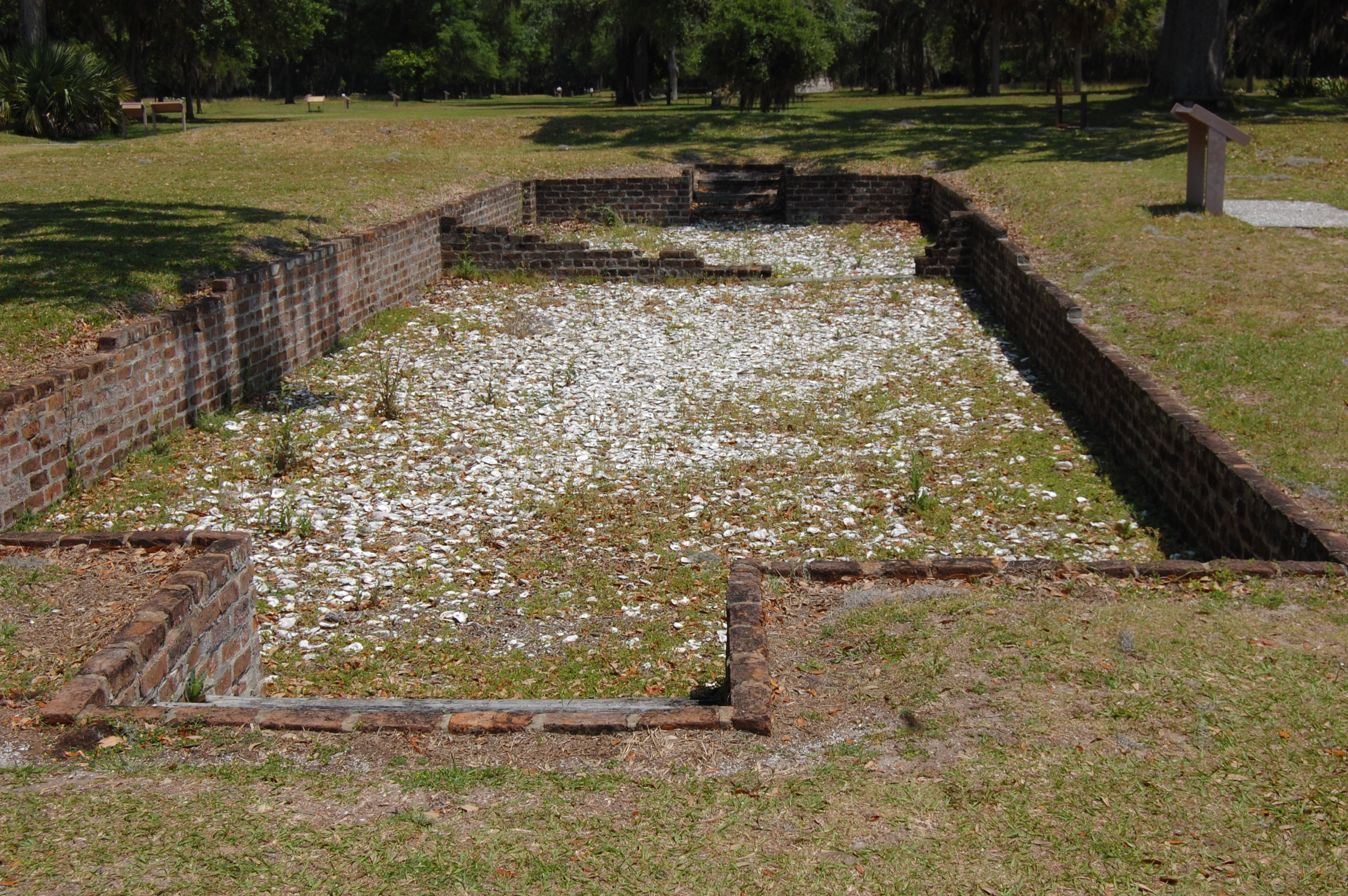
Remains of Frederica house

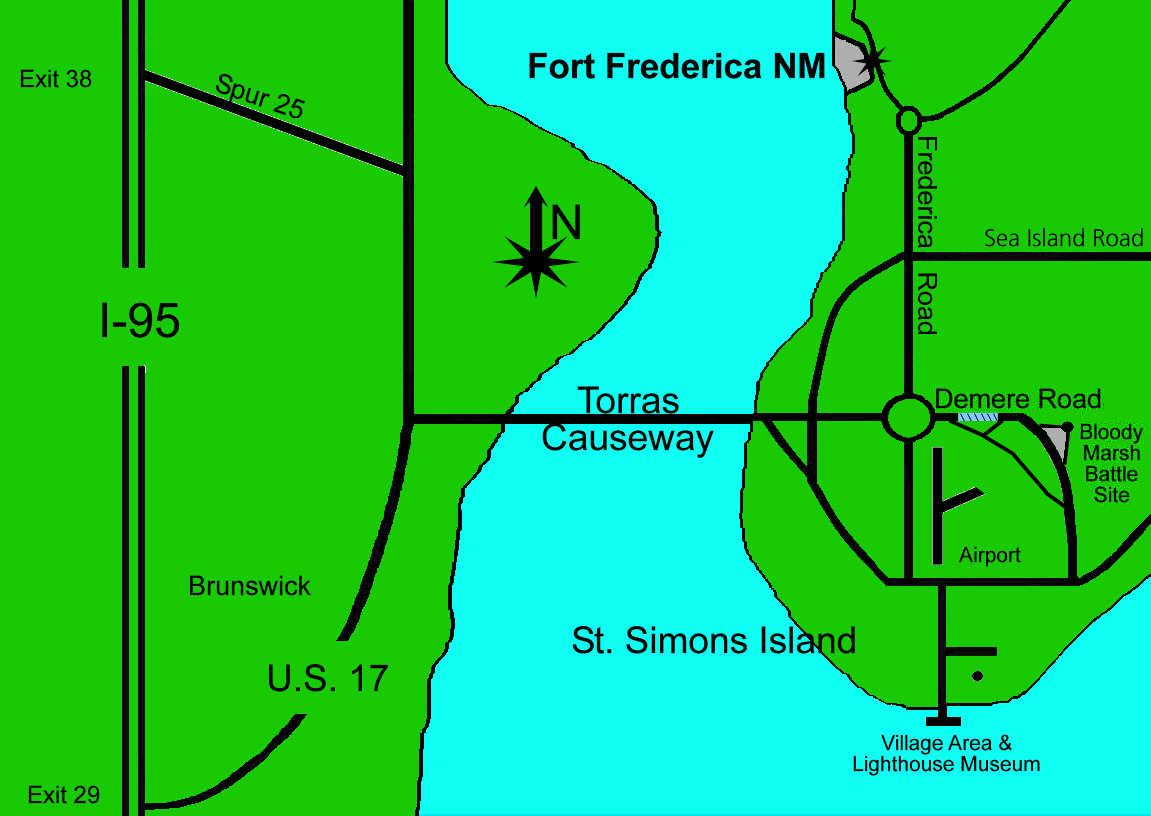
Modern map of the area

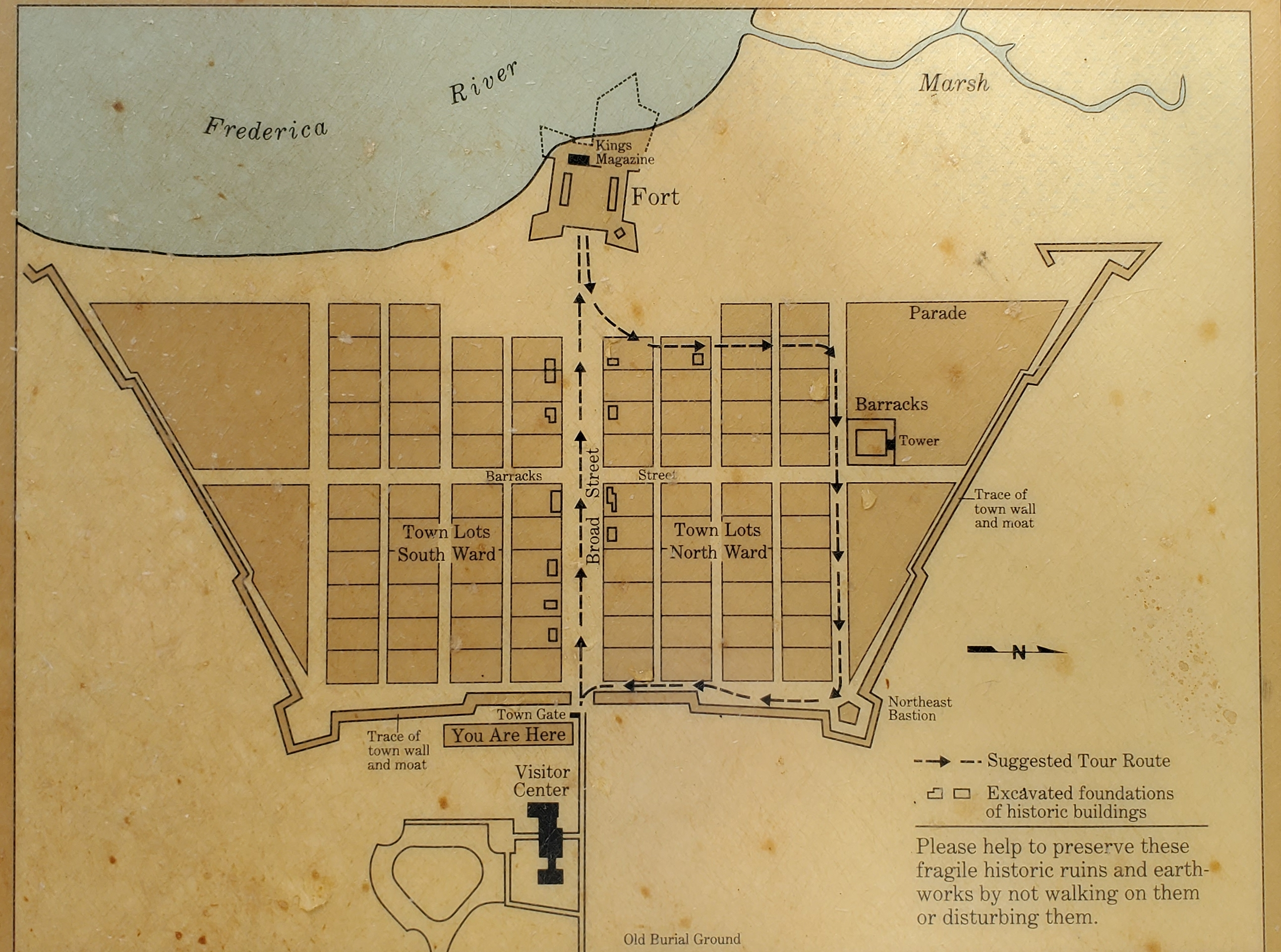
Historical layout of the town

== Related sites ==
- Fort Argyle
- Battle of Bloody Marsh
- Battle of Gully Hole Creek
- Castillo de San Marcos National Monument
- Fort Caroline National Memorial
- Fort King George
- Fort Matanzas National Monument
- Fort Morris State Historic Site
- Wormsloe Historic Site
- Oglethorpe Plan
- List of national monuments of the United States
