= Robert Jenkins (master mariner) =

Welsh master mariner

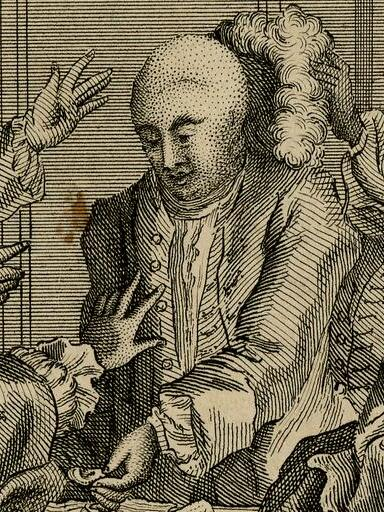
- Cartoon of Jenkins presenting his sliced-off ear, 1738
- Occupation: Master mariner
- Years active: 1730s–1740s
- Known for: War of Jenkins' Ear

Robert Jenkins (fl. 1730s – c. 1740s) was a Welsh master mariner from Llanelli, famous as the protagonist of the "Jenkins's ear" incident, which became a contributory cause of the War of Jenkins' Ear between the Kingdom of Great Britain and the Kingdom of Spain in 1739.

Returning home from a trading voyage in the West Indies in command of the smuggling brig Rebecca in April 1731, Jenkins' ship was stopped and boarded by the Spanish guarda-costa or privateer La Isabela on suspicion of smuggling. According to some accounts, her commander, Juan de León Fandiño, had Jenkins bound to a mast, then sliced off his left ear with his sword and allegedly told him to say to his King "the same will happen to him (the king) if caught doing the same". Another account, in The Pennsylvania Gazette for 7 October 1731, attributes the assault to the Spanish lieutenant Dorce, who "took hold of his left Ear, and with his Cutlass slit it down; and then another of the Spaniards took hold of it and tore it off, but gave him the Piece of his Ear again, bidding him carry it to his Majesty King George".

On arriving in Britain on 11 June, Jenkins addressed his grievances to the king, and gave a deposition which was passed to the Duke of Newcastle in his capacity as Secretary of State for the Southern Department (as such responsible for the American colonies). In his deposition of 18 June 1731, Jenkins stated that the Spanish captain, "took hold of his left Ear and with his Cutlass slit it down, and then another of the Spaniards took hold of it and tore it off, but gave him the Piece of his Ear again." This report was then forwarded to the Commander-in-chief in the West Indies, who then complained of Jenkins' treatment to the Governor of Havana.

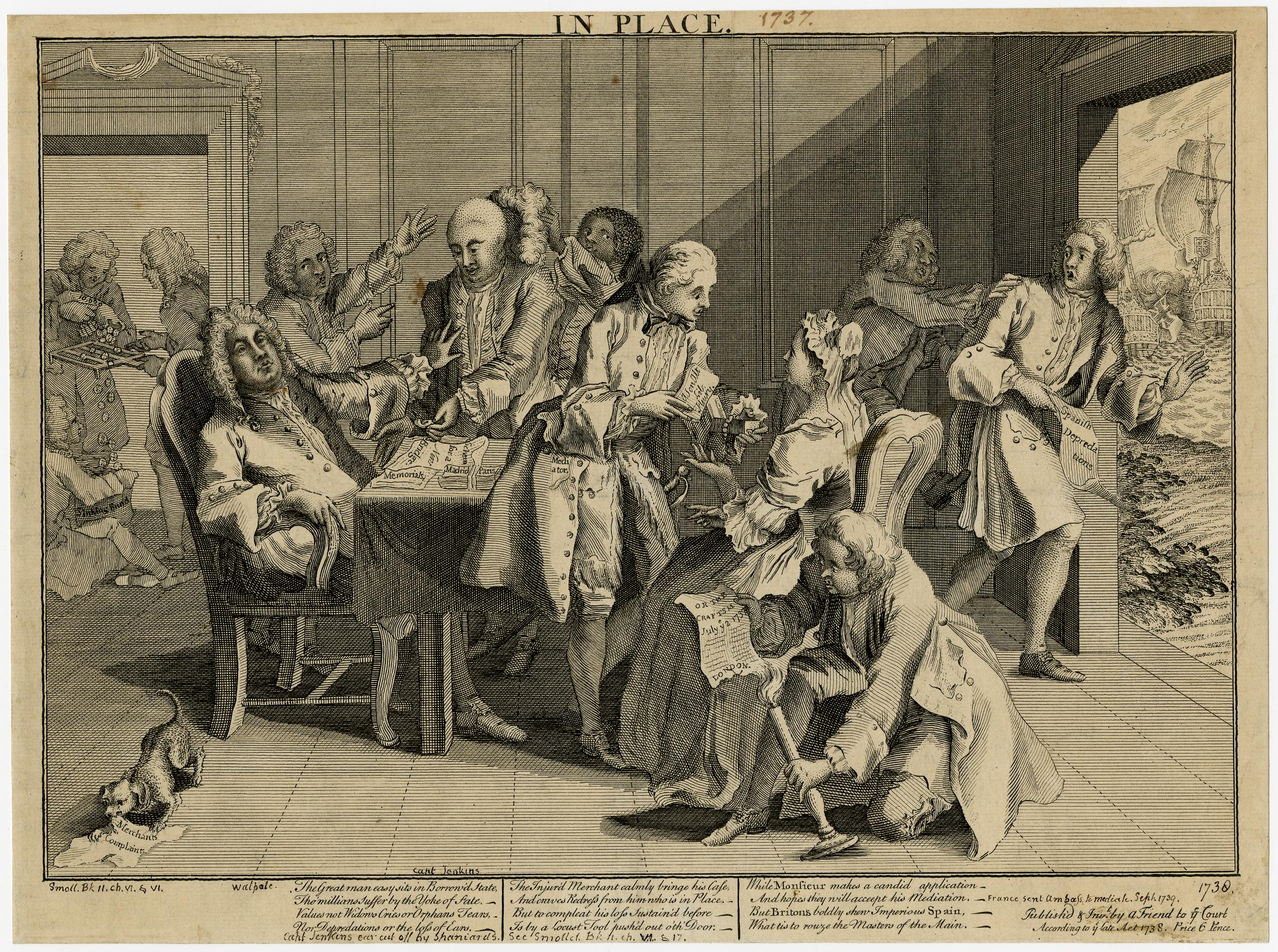
Robert Jenkins hands a dismissive Prime Minister Robert Walpole his severed ear, as his companions lift off his wig to show the scar; one of Walpole's associates displays total indifference, preferring to converse with a lady. Satirical Cartoon, 1738, British Museum

At the time the incident received little attention, but it was reported in The Gentleman's Magazine in June 1731:

The Rebecca, Capt. Jenkins, was taken in her passage from Jamaica, by a Spanish Guarde Costa, who put her people to the torture; part of which was, that they hang'd up the Capt. three times, once with the Cabin-boy at his feet; they then cut off one of his Ears, took away his candles and instruments, and detain'd him a whole day. Being then dismissed, the Captain bore away for the Havana, which the Spaniards perceiving stood after her, and declared, that if she did not immediately go for the Gulf, they would set the Ship on fire; to which they were forced to submit, and after many Hardships and Perils arrived in the River Thames, June 11. The Captain has since been at Court and laid his case before his Majesty.

There is no evidence corroborating the oft-repeated story that in spring 1738 Jenkins told his story with dramatic details before a committee of the House of Commons, producing his severed ear (pickled in a jar). In any case, as a result from the petitions from West India merchants, the opposition in Parliament voted (257 "For" and 209 "Against") on 28 March to ask the King to seek redress from Spain. By summer of 1739, all diplomatic efforts having been exhausted, King George II agreed, on 10 July, to direct the Admiralty Board to initiate maritime reprisals against Spain. The Gentleman's Magazine reported that on 20 July 1739 Vice Admiral Edward Vernon and a squadron of warships departed Britain for the West Indies, and that on 21 July, "Notice was given by the Lords of the Admiralty, that in pursuance of his Majesty's Commission under the Great Seal, Letters of Marque or General Reprisals against the Ships, Goods and Subjects of the King of Spain, were ready to be issued." However, the formal declaration of war against Spain was withheld until Saturday 23 October 1739 [O.S.].

Jenkins was subsequently given the command of a ship in the British East India Company's service. In 1741 he was sent from Britain to Saint Helena to investigate charges of corruption brought against the acting governor, and from May 1741 until March 1742 he administered the affairs of the island. Thereafter he resumed his career at sea. He is said to have preserved his own vessel and three others under his care during an engagement with a pirate vessel.

As for Juan de León Fandiño, he was taken with his snow the San Juan Bautista (10 carriage guns, four of them 6-pounders, and 10 swivels) consisting of 80 crew, described as "Indians, negroes and mulattoes" by Captain Thomas Frankland, of HMS Rose (20), on 4 June 1742. Frankland also recaptured three prizes taken by Fandiño. At the time The London Gazette wrote "Captain Frankland has sent him to England, and he is now in Custody at Portsmouth". After 19 months in captivity, Fandiño and his son were released by virtue of an agreement to exchange prisoners signed in Paris. They arrived in San Sebastián on 19 January 1744 and proceeded to Cádiz with the object of returning to Havana.

== Fact versus fiction ==
The confrontational nature of British politics in 1738 led many who were opposed to launching a naval war against Spain to doubt the truthfulness of Jenkins' story. No serious research was undertaken until the late 1880s when John Knox Laughton, the founder of the Navy Records Society, uncovered contemporary letters from Jamaica in September and October 1731 which substantiated Jenkin's account of his losing an ear to a Spanish Guarda Costa on 9 April 1731 (Old Style; 20 April New Style). Writing from on board HMS Lion at Port Royal, Jamaica on 12 October 1731 [O.S.] to the Admiralty in London, Rear-Admiral Charles Stewart confided, "I was a little surprised to hear of the usage Captain Jenkins met with off the Havana." Earlier, on 12 September 1731, Rear-Admiral Stewart had written to the Governor of Havana to complain of the "violence and villainies" of a Guarda Costa commander named Fandino who, "about the 20th April last [N.S.] sailed out of your harbor in one of those Guarda Costas, and met a ship of this island bound for Britain; and after using the captain in a most barbarous inhuman manner, taking all his money, cutting off one of his ears, plundering him of those necessaries which were to carry the ship safe home...".

Contained within the Admiralty records files with the 1731 correspondence from Jamaica was a List of British Merchant ships taken or plundered by the Spaniards compiled in 1737, listing 52 ships, among them, Rebecca, Robert Jenkins, Jamaica to London, boarded and plundered near the Havana, 9 April 1731.

Shortly after Professor Laughton published his "Jenkins's Ear" research in the English Historical Review, a Royal Navy colleague wrote, on 26 October 1889, to inform the historian: "I have a curious book connected with the subject, published in London in 1739, entitled England's Triumph: or a complete History of the many signals victories gained by the Royal Navy & Merchant Ships of Great Britain, for the term of 40 years past over the insulting & haught Spaniards by Captain Charles Jenkins, who has too severely felt the effects of Spanish tyranny. On page 64 is an illustration representing A Spanish Guarda Costa boarding Capt. Jenkin's ship & cutting off his Ear." The 1889 correspondent noted that the 1739 author was named Charles Jenkins, while Laughton's research had proved the real mariner was named Robert Jenkins.

However, when Laughton subsequently examined the 1739 publication, he found it held little detail about Jenkins himself, and, in writing Robert Jenkins's entry for the Dictionary of National Biography he dismissed it as, "a catch-penny chapbook, in which no reference is made to Jenkins's case, except in a worthless frontispiece".

Mirabeau effectively quoted Jenkins's case when arguing before the French assembly (20–2 May 1790) against the policy of entrusting a popular assembly with the power of declaring peace or war.

== See also ==
- War of Jenkins' Ear

== Sources ==
- T. H. Brooke, History of the Island of St Helena (London, 2nd ed., 1824).
- H. R. Janisch, Extracts from the St Helena Records, 1885.
