= Juan Márquez Cabrera =

Spanish colonial governor

31st Governor of Spanish Honduras
- In office 1668–1672
- Preceded by: Juan de Zuazo
- Succeeded by: Pedro de Godoy Ponce de León

28th Governor of La Florida
- In office September 28, 1680 – April 11, 1687
- Preceded by: Pablo de Hita y Salazar
- Succeeded by: Pedro de Aranda y Avellaneda

Personal details
- Born: unknown unknown
- Died: unknown unknown
- Profession: soldier and administrator (governor)

Military service
- Battles/wars: 1686 Spanish Invasion of South Carolina

Juan Márquez Cabrera was a Spanish soldier who served as governor of Honduras (1668 – 1672) and then of Spanish Florida (1680 – 1687), until he was dismissed for abuses in office against the native peoples and Spanish citizens of Florida. He, as did the three previous governors, spent much time supervising construction of the Castillo de San Marcos and other fortifications in the presidio of St. Augustine as well as defending Florida against incursions from the British to the north.

== Career ==
Juan Márquez Cabrera joined the Spanish Army in his youth. He excelled in his military career, attaining the rank of sergeant major. In 1668, he was appointed governor of Honduras, an office he occupied until 1672. On September 28, 1680, Cabrera was appointed governor of Florida to replace Pablo de Hita y Salazar.

=== Florida government ===
==== Early years in the Florida government ====
He arrived at St. Augustine, capital of the province, on November 30 of that year. On his arrival, Hita y Salazar gave him a report that included a detailed outline of his administration's progress in St. Augustine, and described the progress on the works of the Castillo de San Marcos. None of these changes, however, corresponded to the original plans that had been commissioned by the Crown.

Governor Cabrera made a series of investigations that concluded works done on the Castillo under Salazar's supervision did not coincide with the report he gave to the new governor. His engineers found errors and deficiencies in the structures he was commanded to build, especially regarding the walls and bastions.

Cabrera also levied an onerous tax on ranchers in Florida and ordered that all cattle should be butchered at the slaughterhouse in St. Augustine.

In 1683, Governor Cabrera formed a militia company of free mulattos (pardos) and blacks (morenos) militia in St. Augustine, consisting of 42 men and six officers. Later that same year they helped drive away a fleet of pirates led by the Frenchman Michel Grammont.

==== English and French pirate threat ====
In February 1683, the Governor of Havana warned Cabrera that French and English pirates from the Bahamas were going to attack St. Augustine. The governor set about preparing the town's defenses, and ordered the erection of two new watchtowers on the coast, one about 27 miles southward at Ayamón, and the other on the waterfront north of town. On April 30, the French pirate Brigaut entered Matanzas Inlet at the south end of Anastasia Island and seized the watchtower. The alarm was raised in St. Augustine, and Cabrera ordered the inhabitants of the town to take shelter in the unfinished Castillo de San Marcos, and sent ninety soldiers to engage the pirates. After several clashes on the island, Brigraut withdrew; the pirate fleet then abandoned its assault and sailed north.

==== Last years as Governor of Florida ====
In 1686, faced with the possible presence of Robert Cavelier's French colony on the lower Mississippi River, Cabrera assigned Marcos Delgado to lead a troop of 13 soldiers and 40 Indians to explore and observe the territory between San Luis de Apalache and the river and bay of Espiritu Santo bay. The objective of the expedition was to search for and destroy the colony. Delgado and his men traveled through of places such as Dothan and Mobile County, in modern-day Alabama, and made contact with several Native American tribes (including the Choctaw and Cherokee people), but did not find the colony.

In August, 1686, Governor Cabrera sponsored a strike force of Spaniards, Guale Indians, and pardo militiamen, under the overall command of Tomás de León, that sacked the plantation of the English Governor of Carolina, Joseph Morton, Paul Grimball, as well as others, and burned the Scottish settlement at Port Royal Island. Captain de León intended to attack Charles Town but a sudden storm arose, forcing the Spanish to return to St. Augustine.

Cabrera's administration negatively impacted and abused the Indigenous peoples of the province as well as criollos, Christian natives, widows, Mexicans, and Cubans, causing the Franciscans to protest vociferously against the governor, leading to his arrest by the Crown. On April 11, 1687, he was replaced by Diego de Quiroga y Losado as governor of La Florida.
