= Nicolás Ponce de León II =

Spanish soldier

Nicolás Suárez Ponce de León II

Acting Governor of La Florida
- In office November 2, 1663 – December 30, 1664
- Preceded by: Alonso de Aranguiz y Cortés
- Succeeded by: Francisco de la Guerra y de la Vega
- In office July 8, 1673 – May 3, 1675
- Preceded by: Manuel de Cendoya
- Succeeded by: Pablo de Hita y Salazar

Personal details
- Born: 1630-1635 St. Augustine, Florida
- Died: unknown
- Profession: Soldier, Sergeant major interim governor

Nicolás Suárez Ponce de León II was a Spanish soldier who served as acting governor of Spanish Florida from 1663 to 1664, and from 1673 to 1675. He was appointed to a second term as interim governor after the death of Manuel de Cendoya, and continued construction of the masonry fort, the Castillo de San Marcos, to defend the city against attacks by British colonists from the Province of Carolina.

== Biography ==
Nicolás Ponce II was born in St. Augustine, Florida. He was the son of the former governor of La Florida, Nicolás Suárez Ponce de León (1631 – 1633 and 1651), who had also served as official accountant of the Royal Treasury of La Florida. The young Ponce de León II enlisted in the Spanish Army on December 20, 1648. In May 1651, he joined the company of Luis Salazar y Valdecillas.

After the death of Benito Ruíz de Salazar Vallecilla in the same month, Nicolás Suárez Ponce de León was appointed acting governor of Florida.

Nicolás Ponce II assumed the office of acting governor of Florida on November 2, 1663, ruling until December 30, 1664, and a second time from July 8, 1673 to May 3, 1675, following the death of Manuel de Cendoya. He continued construction of the Castillo de San Marcos, the new defensive fort at St. Augustine, begun by Cendoya. Construction proceeded at a slow pace because of engineering errors and sloppiness by the Spanish building supervisors, as well as the collapse of scaffolding and poorly built sections of the fort's walls. Most of the work of building the structure was done by the forced labor of local Native Americans; disease caused by poor hygiene and overcrowding killed many of them. The excessive weight of the loads they had to carry also caused them to develop musculoskeletal problems and contributed to the high casualty rate. Lack of funds remained the biggest impediment to progress in the construction, as thousands of pesos (the equivalent of thousands of dollars) were required to supply food and wages.

On October 2, 1672, Nicolás Ponce II, now Sergeant Major, was the senior crown-appointed military officer present when ground was officially broken for the foundation of a new Castillo de San Marcos, a masonry structure, to replace the inadequate wooden fort. When the English pirate, Robert Searle, had led a raid on St. Augustine in May 1668, Ponce had shepherded the unarmed men and the women and children of the presidio to safety in the woods while the pirates attacked the fort and sacked the city.

In addition to Native Americans, Spanish and English prisoners (who were better treated) and fifty black slaves, including skilled craftsmen, worked on construction of the new fort, which was stopped because of several accidents and lack of the funds (the royal situado) supposed to be sent by the Crown from Mexico City. Pablo de Hita y Salazar was subsequently appointed official governor of Florida.
