= Pablo de Hita y Salazar =

Spanish military officer (1646–unknown)

27th Governor of La Florida
- In office 3 May 1675 – 28 September 1680
- Preceded by: Nicolás Ponce de León II
- Succeeded by: Juan Márquez Cabrera

Personal details
- Born: 1646 Seville, Spain
- Died: unknown
- Spouse: Juana de Ávila
- Profession: Soldier; Governor

Pablo de Hita y Salazar (1646–date of death unknown) was a Spanish military officer who served as governor of Spanish Florida (La Florida) from 1675 to 1680. The territory at the time stretched from current-day Florida west to Texas and north to South Carolina. He was best known for his work devoted to construction of the Castillo de San Marcos in St. Augustine, the capital of La Florida.

== Early years ==
Hita y Salazar was born about 1646 in Seville, Spain.

== Military career ==
Hita y Salazar joined the Spanish army as a youth, serving in Flanders, Germany, Mexico and in the Cambray War over the course of forty years. He attained the rank of Sargento mayor (Sergeant major). In 1670, Hita y Salazar moved with his wife and six children to Veracruz, where from 1670 to 1674 he was chief administrative officer, or corregidor, of Veracruz. He served in the military until May 3, 1675, the year in which the Spanish Crown chose him to become the new governor of Florida. Hita y Salazar's performance at San Juan de Ulúa and his experience in the Flanders war led to this appointment as Governor of Florida. Hita y Salazar also organized the construction of the port of San Juan de Ulloa.

== Governor of Florida ==
=== The Castillo de San Marcos ===
When Hita y Salazar was 29 years old, he left Sevilla and moved to Florida. Once he became governor, plans were made to construct a new masonry fortress, the Castillo de San Marcos, to replace the series of wooden structures that had previously defended the presidio. During that time, the Florida government under Hita y Salazar made further changes and reforms in the plans for the castle's construction. Although it was Manuel de Cendoya who began the construction of Castillo de San Marcos, it was Hita y Salazar who consolidated the final draft: dimensions of the square, placement of fortification elements, polvorines and soldier houses. The workers were primarily recruited Native Americans from the area. Hita y Salazar recommended (following the military engineering concepts in vogue) that the fort be made in a pentagonal shape (the same as the fort of San Diego, in Acapulco, Mexico), although the idea was rejected by his advisers.

On July 30, Hita y Salazar heard that another fortress was being created, and thought that it was unnecessary. Hita y Salazar sent two letters to the Crown in which he explained the progress made at the Castillo de San Marcos and made suggestions for construction of the fort. He also explained that he thought any attacker who arrived in St. Augustine would try to conquer it and hold Anastasia Island, cutting off resupply fleets and bombarding the castle. To protect the island and prevent an invasion, Hita y Salazar decided that its engineers should build a four-armed redoubt, to be placed on the coast near the El Pinillo inlet (which no longer exists) of the Matanzas River, guarding access to St. Augustine.

It seemed that many of Hita y Salazar's decisions may have been influenced by a false idea that there was an army on Anastasia Island that could bombard the castle and cut off supply lines. There was no army there, however. He withdrew his theory of the invasion of the island, but in 1739 the British general James Oglethorpe did exactly what Hita y Salazar had described. The supply ships were prepared for the attack, and the castle was able to prevent the few cannonballs that were sent by Oglethorpe. Blocks and others elements (such as the Coquina rock) with which the castle was built, blocked the impact of the cannonballs. Consequently, the bombardment was ineffective. Hita y Salazar sent a plane to the Viceroy of New Spain, Payo Enríquez de Rivera, explaining the state the Fort was in and that his advance, foundations, tanks and bastions that were being built. Hita y Salazar, apparently, had reached economic and technical problems in certain parts of the work. The accounts and expenses always exceeded the budgeted amount. He faced an inquest in 1678, but came out unscathed.

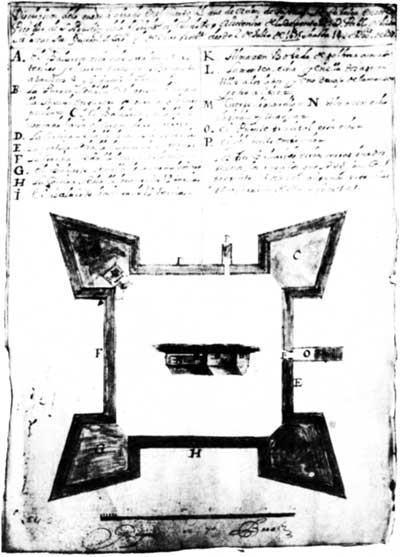
Construction plan of the Castillo de San Marcos from 1677, during the Hita y Salazar government

Hita y Salazar ordered the construction of a battery in front of the castle to protect the deck and the pier. This was so that transport activities carried out by the ships would remain in force during the duration of the attack. All these changes would be paid by the defenses expense. When Hita y Salazar came to west Florida, he decided he could make a wall of defense to prevent a military attack by replacing the wall with a real stone wall. This idea showed, at least to his staff, that he did not understand the fabrication of a fortification, which prompted them to send a letter to the Spanish Crown criticizing him.

Before the Spanish crown had sent a response, Hita y Salazar made a decision to stop all construction on the fort. This interruption of the construction was rejected by many people in St. Augustine. On May 8, 1676, the staff of Hita y Salazar sent another letter to the Crown complaining about the plans of their superior. The Crown decided that he should not make these changes and that he was not competent enough for this position because, according to him, the Royal politics - including those linked to the construction of Castillo de San Marcos - was more important than the ideas of a simple soldier in the army, since he had no experience in construction. Hita y Salazar warned the Crown of the need to stay with the original plans. On October 14, 1676, the Real Accounts sent another letter to the crown that indicated a long list of expenses, changes and delays made by the Governor Hita y Salazar, including the wages paid to workers, even when they had done nothing significant.

On July 3, 1679, the reply from the Crown arrived, indicating that the construction should follow the original construction plans.

=== Suspension of charge ===
The following year, on September 28, 1680, when the walls were nearly finished, and the pit was finished, including the embankment (although the officials in charge of the work said that the project still needed four more years and an expenditure of eighty thousand pesos), Hita y Salazar was suspended from office as governor of Florida. On November 30, of that year, with the arrival of the new governor of the province, Juan Márquez Cabrera, Hita y Salazar gave him a report that included a detailed outline of the progress made by in the city up until that time. In this report, he explained the many changes he made in the castle (which he considered insufficient) and included the plans of Apalache, Guale and San Marcos, as references on what he had done. None of these changes corresponded to the original plans, which meant that he had rejected the orders of the Crown in the construction of the castle.

Governor Cabrera made a series of investigations that concluded the numbers of materials and structures carried out in St. Augustine by Hita y Salazar, and those that he indicated to have done in the castle. The reports did not coincide. Cabrera's engineers found many errors in the structures that Hita y Salazar had ordered to be built, especially some walls and bastions which were unstable because their bases were incomplete. One side of the bastion of San Carlos had to be completely rebuilt, as the wall was uneven. The former Governor Hita y Salazar blamed the discrepancy on his engineer, Lajon Lorenzo, who he said had provided him the data to produce these pieces.

Construction on the castle continued until 1695, and cost tons of gold. In 1695, the walls were 26 meters high and were effective in the siege of 1702, keeping the whole population of the city in a fortress surrounded by 300 soldiers. After two months, the fort was broken.

=== Contribution to livestock and construction of other forts ===
Hita y Salazar was not only dedicated to building fortifications to prevent British attacks on Florida. He also gave a boost to the livestock, distributing land to his friends, the criollos of the province. Hita y Salazar was instrumental in developing cattle breeding in the area. He decided to establish himself as a farmer and lived in Saint Augustine and in 1680, had a house built that still exists in the city.

In 1679, while Hita y Salazar was dedicated to the construction of Castillo de San Marcos (and as part of the Spanish colonial expansion in the northwestern Florida area), the construction of a fort at San Marcos de Apalache, in St. Marks, Florida began. It was built to prevent external attacks against the colony. The fort was initially built of wood, coated with mud, and acted as a wooden stockade. It remained this way for three years.

== Knowledge ==
Because of his military career, he knew about fortifications and had probably read the treaties of Adam Freitag (L'Architecture militaire ou la fortification nouvelle), David Papillon, and Matthias Dogen that contained the experiences of military fortification in Flanders, as well as the books of Prieto Floriani, the books of the Jesuit, Jean Dubreuil, Sieur de Bitainvieu, and Pagan Lein's work Fortifications. All were published in the seventeenth century and highlight the relationship between the population and the fort.

== Personal life ==
Hita y Salazar married Juana de Ávila (née Ruíz) and they had six children: Gerónimo Fernando, Catalina, Juan Antonio, Pablo Domingo, Gerónima, and Pedro Francisco Hita y Salazar.

Hita y Salazar is related to Venezuelan media mogul, Gustavo Cisneros, through his paternal branch of the family.
