= Francisco de la Guerra y de la Vega =

Governor of Spanish Florida

Acting Governor of La Florida
- In office December 30, 1664 – July 6, 1671
- Preceded by: Nicolas Ponce de Leon II
- Succeeded by: Manuel de Cendoya

Personal details
- Profession: governor

Francisco de la Guerra y de la Vega was the governor of Spanish Florida (La Florida) between December 30, 1664 and July 6, 1671. He participated in the war against the British buccaneers who sacked and plundered the province's capital, St. Augustine (San Agustín) in 1668. On May 29, 1668, St. Augustine was invaded by the English privateer Robert Searle (alias John Davis) of Jamaica. Searle's fleet had already captured St. Augustine's own frigate near Havana, as well as the situado ship from Vera Cruz carrying flour to St. Augustine. Searle's men marauded and looted the city, killing 60 of its residents.

== Career ==
Francisco de la Guerra y de la Vega was appointed governor of Florida by Philip IV on December 30, 1664.

Guerra forced the Timucua to perform certain labors in St. Augustine, the capital of La Florida, and threatened to condemn to forced labor on the royal construction projects those who were absent from their assigned tasks without his consent. The caciques, or chiefs, of the Timucua would be subject to public punishment if they allowed Timucua fugitives from these assignations to return to their own villages.

On May 29, 1668, St. Augustine was invaded by the English privateer Robert Searle (alias John Davis) of Jamaica. Searle's fleet had already captured St. Augustine's official frigate near Havana, as well as the ship that carried the annual situado (royal subsidy) from Veracruz (in modern-day Mexico), which carried flour to the Floridian city. Searle's men marauded and looted the city, killing 60 of its residents.

During the raid, Searle had captured about 70 men, women and children. On May 30, Searle sent the governor a message, indicating that he would release the captives in exchange for water, meat and wood. The governor accepted the proposition, asking in return that the Captain provide him with some flour from the Veracruz ship. The same day, the women were released. During the next six days the ransom was paid and the other prisoners were released on June 5.

Small arms were in short supply after the town's sacking, as the English had destroyed most of the munitions stored in the main guardhouse. Food was scarce as well, since they had also seized the flour carried by a Spanish ship from the West of New Spain, and the maize crop had failed due to drought. In response to the situation, Guerra canceled the rations issued to former soldiers and seized a frigate, belonging to Ignacio de Losa, from Havana to bring maize from Apalachee. On July 7, Guerra reported the raid to the viceroy of New Spain and requested supplies and funds to relieve his people. He asked help the General Captain of Havana to purchase a frigate for St. Augustine, in order to secure provisions and feed the population.

Following Searles' raid on St. Augustine, the Queen Regent Marianna gave the order for the construction of a new fort, the Castillo de San Marcos, construction of which started under the administration of Governor Manuel de Cendoya in late 1671, after the end of De la Guerra's governorship on July 6.

== Personal life ==
Although the Spanish law Royal forbade colonial governors marrying into a local family, Guerra y de la Vega married a local woman, Lorenza de Soto y Aspiolea, and had three children out of wedlock. Within a week of the arrival of Manuel de Cendoya to Florida as new governor of the colony, Guerra and Soto y Aspiolea were married.
