= Laureano de Torres y Ayala =

Spanish military officer and royal governor

30th Governor of La Florida
- In office 21 September 1693 – 20 May 1699
- Monarch: Charles II
- Chief Minister: Manuel Joaquín Álvarez de Toledo; Cardinal Portocarrero
- Viceroy of New Spain: Gaspar de la Cerda; Juan Ortega y Montañés; José Sarmiento de Valladares
- Captain General of Cuba: Severino de Manzaneda Salinas y Rozas; Diego Córdoba Lasso de la Vega
- Preceded by: Diego de Quiroga y Losada
- Succeeded by: José de Zúñiga y la Cerda

42nd and 49th Governor of Cuba
- In office January 18, 1708 – February 18, 1711
- Monarch: Philip V of Spain
- Secretary of State of the Universal Bureau: Pedro Fernández del Campo y Salvatierra
- Viceroy of New Spain: Francisco Fernández de la Cueva, 10th Duke of Alburquerque; Fernando de Alencastre
- Preceded by: Pedro Álvarez de Villarín
- Succeeded by: Pablo Cavero
- In office February 14, 1713 – May 26, 1716
- Monarch: Philip V
- Secretary of State of the Universal Bureau: Pedro Fernández del Campo y Salvatierra; Manuel de Vadillo y Velasco
- Secretary of State for the Navy and the Indies: Bernardo Tinajero de la Escalera
- Viceroy of New Spain: Fernando de Alencastre
- Preceded by: Luis Chacón
- Succeeded by: Vicente de Raja

Personal details
- Born: 5 February 1645 Seville, Spain
- Died: 1 September 1725 (aged 80) Havana, Cuba
- Spouse: Catalina Gertrudis Bayona y Chacón (m. 1687)
- Children: 3
- Profession: Soldier; Governor

Laureano de Torres y Ayala (1645–1725), Marquis of Casa Torres and Knight of Santiago, was a Spanish military officer and royal governor of La Florida (1693–1699) and of Cuba (1708–1711 and 1713–1716). During his administration in Florida, he completed the construction of the Castillo de San Marcos fortress in St. Augustine (San Agustín), the provincial capital.

== Biography ==
Laureano José de Torres Ayala y Quadros Castellanos was born in 1645 in Seville, Spain, and grew up in Madrid, where his parents settled when he was still a small child. Ayala came from a noble family, being the son of Tomás de Torres y Ayala and Elvira de Quadros Castellanos. His father was a judge in Seville in 1649 and mayor, governor and Captain General of Mérida and La Grita (in Venezuela). He had three brothers: Pedro Ignacio, Cristóbal and Diego Torres Ayala y Quadros. In his youth he joined the Spanish army.

In June 1693, Ayala joined a Spanish expedition in La Florida which passed through what is now Okaloosa County and crossed the natural bridge of the spring-fed Chipola River. On September 21, 1693, Torres y Ayala was appointed Governor of Spanish Florida, replacing Diego de Quiroga y Losada.

Like the previous governors since 1672, Torres y Ayala oversaw construction of the Castillo de San Marcos, completed in 1695. During his administration, the San Carlos de los Chacatos mission was attacked by Alibamu Indian warriors in 1696. In 1698, the first European settlement (Presidio Santa Maria de Galve) and the first fort (Fort San Carlos de Austria) were founded at the site of present-day Pensacola. He held the post of governor of Florida until 1699, when he returned to Spain, being replaced by José de Zúñiga y la Cerda.

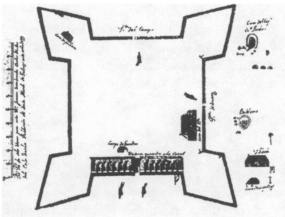
Spanish plan for Fort San Carlos de Austria, the first fort built (1698) at the site of Pensacola, Florida.

Between 1704 and 1707, Ayala fought in the War of the Spanish Succession in Europe. On January 18, 1708, Ayala was appointed Governor General of Cuba, and worked mainly at Havana, where he was principally concerned with the island's economic problems and defenses. A Spanish official and landowner, Orri, had proposed a project to sell tobacco for the Cuban government. Ayala thought that the idea would be advantageous to Spain and lent the plan his full support, but had to contend with the opposition of the speculators who legally bypassed customs duties when they shipped tobacco to other ports in America and Spain. The government tobacco monopoly was very successful, and Ayala was rewarded with the title of Marquis de Casa-Torre, notwithstanding his disputes with Lieutenant-auditor Jose Fernandez de Córdoba.

On February 18, 1711, the oidor (judge of the Real Audiencia) Pablo Cavera had Ayala temporarily suspended while the matter was investigated. After sailing to Spain to explain his case, Ayala was reinstated as governor of Cuba on February 14, 1713. The administration of Governor Ayala was a period of relative peace. On June 9, 1714, he ordered the construction of a hospital for lepers in Havana; after collecting several large donations, he began construction of the Hospital de San Lazaro and its church on a plot located near Havana city. Ayala founded the city of Santiago del Bejucal. The tobacco industry expanded greatly during his governorship, and the tobacco plant began to be widely cultivated in the Vuelta Abajo district.

Ayala died in 1725 in Havana, Cuba.

== Personal life ==
Laureano de Torres y Ayala married the Cuban Catalina Gertrudis Bayona y Chacón on August 5, 1687 in Havana. He had three children: Tomasa María, Laureano Antonio José, and Sor Manuela de San Laureano.

== In popular culture ==
Ayala appears as one of the two main antagonists (alongside Bartholomew Roberts) in the 2013 video game Assassin's Creed IV: Black Flag. Portrayed as the Grand Master of the Templar Order in the Caribbean, he plans to use Roberts to find and access the Observatory, an ancient surveillance facility that would allow the Templars to locate and spy on people anywhere on the globe; Ayala intends to use this technology to blackmail world leaders and enable the Templars to secretly rule the world. During the final confrontation of the game, Ayala locates the Observatory in Jamaica, but is killed shortly after by protagonist Edward Kenway.
