= Paul Hamilton (representative) =

South Carolina state representative

- Photograph of Paul Hamilton's house "Brick House" in South Carolina, circa 1920s

Member of the South Carolina House of Commons
- In office 1720–1721

Personal details
- Born: 1695 Edisto Island, South Carolina, Province of Carolina
- Died: March 1739 (aged 43–44) Charleston, South Carolina, United States
- Spouse: Martha Bower
- Children: 4
- Occupation: Politician; Planter class

Paul Hamilton was a South Carolina representative to the colonial House of Commons in the 1720s. He was a prominent landowner and plantation owner as well as the namesake and grandfather of US Secretary of Navy Paul Hamilton. His house in South Carolina still stands as ruins that can be visited today.

== Early life and family ==
Paul Hamilton was born in 1695 on Edisto Island, in South Carolina. He was born to English immigrant Capt. John Hamilton and colonial native Mary Grimball, daughter of Paul Grimball, who led the settler resistance during the 1686 Spanish Invasion of South Carolina.

== Political career ==
He served as a representative to the South Carolina House of Commons in the early 1720s. He served under governor James Moore Jr., during which the colony went through many strenuous times.

== Later life and legacy ==
After his tenure in the House of Commons, he continued to live as a planter and member of the elite. He managed his plantation property, which encompassed many hundreds of acres; the property and its enslaved workers were divided among his four children after his death in 1739. His grandson Paul Hamilton went on to become Governor of South Carolina and United States Secretary of the Navy during the War of 1812. His plantation house in Edisto Island still stands in the form of ruins.
