= Manuel de Cendoya =

Royal governor of Spanish Florida

24th Governor of La Florida
- In office July 6, 1671 – July 8, 1673
- Preceded by: Francisco de la Guerra y de la Vega
- Succeeded by: Nicolás Ponce de León II

Personal details
- Born: early 17th century
- Died: July 8, 1673 Saint Augustine, Florida
- Profession: Soldier and administrator (governor of Florida)

Manuel de Cendoya (? – 1673) was a Spanish soldier who served as governor of Spanish Florida (La Florida) from mid-1671 to mid-1673. His administration is remembered primarily for initiating construction of the Castillo de San Marcos, a masonry fortress whose building had first been ordered by Cendoya's predecessor, Governor Francisco de la Guerra y de la Vega, after the destructive raid of the English privateer Robert Searle in 1668. Work proceeded in 1671, although the first stone was not laid until 1672.

== Biography ==
=== Early years ===
Manuel de Cendoya was born in the early 17th century. As a youth, he joined the Spanish army, where he learned military engineering. During his 22 years of service, he fought in several military campaigns to capture enemy strongholds in Extremadura, Guipúzcoa, Flanders, and Italy, eventually attaining the rank of sergeant major

On July 6, 1671, when Cendoya was in Cadiz, Spain, he was appointed royal governor and captain general of Florida. He left Cadiz for Florida the same year with his wife and his two children.

== Government of Florida ==
=== Castillo de San Marcos ===
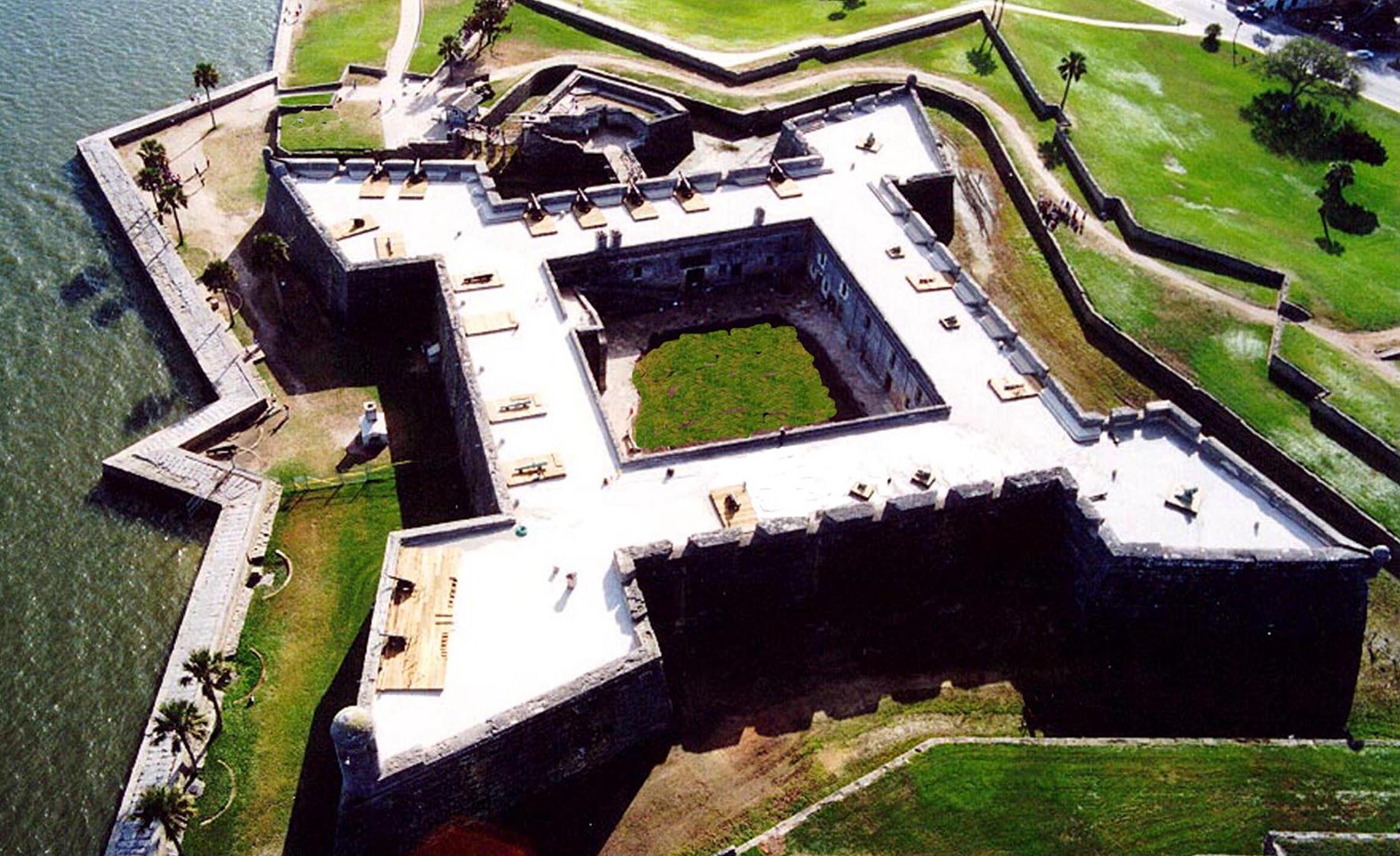
Construction of the Castillo de San Marcos began on October 2, 1672, and continued through the administrations of seven successive governors, finally being completed in 1695.

Before assuming the governorship, Cendoya sailed to Mexico in November 1671 to receive the appropriated funds and consult with the Viceroy of New Spain, Sebastián de Toledo, and his military engineers about the construction of a new fort to defend the colony. The present one was a small structure with four bastions made of timbers that were being undermined by tidal waters. It was decided that Cendoya should build a second small wooden fort at the St. Augustine inlet of the Matanzas River (actually a tidal lagoon), and a third to prevent troop landings, as well as a large masonry fort to defend the capital of La Florida. To build all this would require thirty thousand pesos, but then news arrived of the establishment of Charles Town in the British colony of Carolina. Consequently, Cendoya suggested building a fourth fort at Santa Catalina de Guale as well to prevent British incursions southward. Cendoya gave orders the same year for surveying the grounds where the new blockhouses and the fortress would be erected.

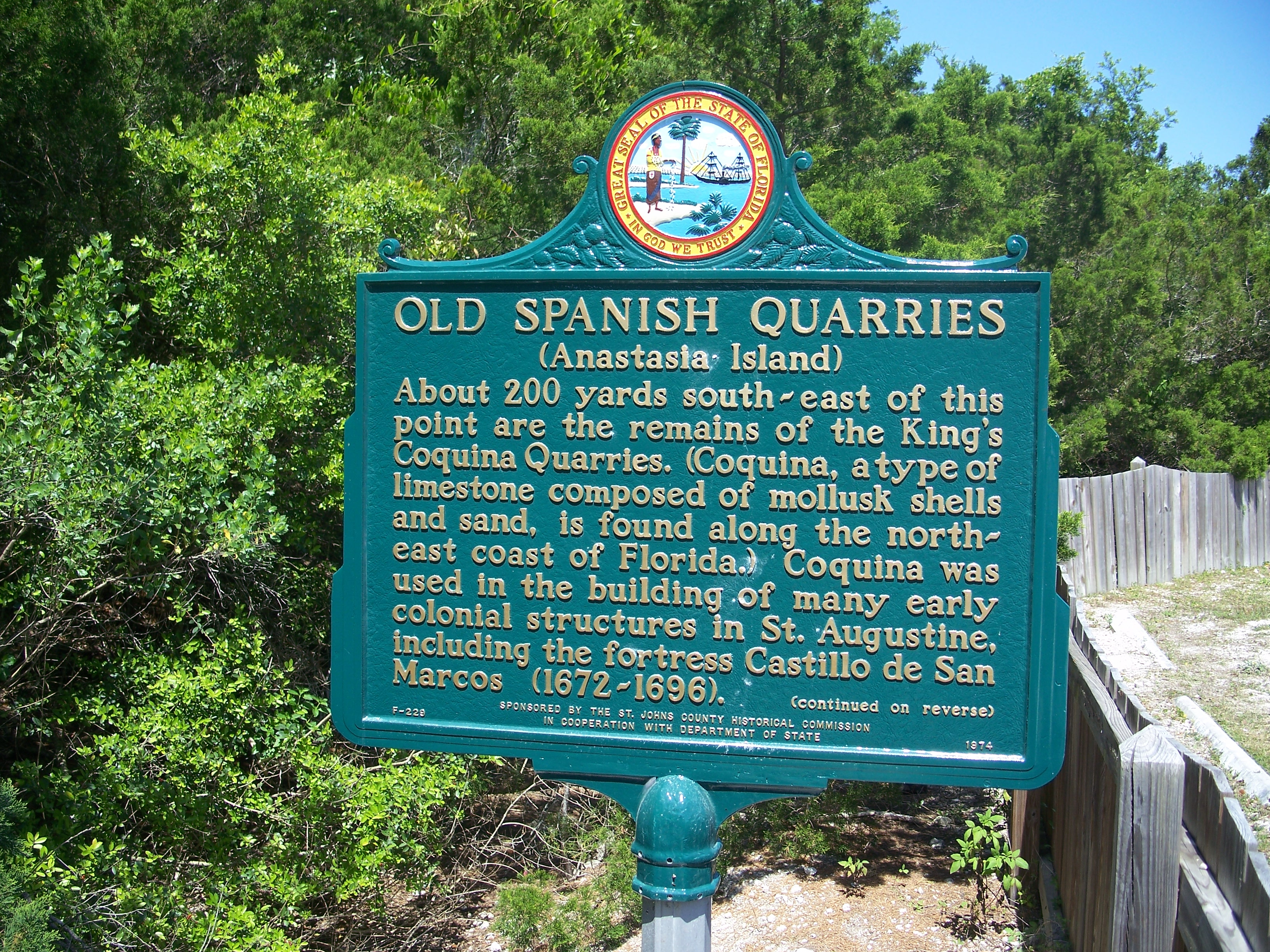
Spanish Coquina Quarries, on Anastasia Island. Blocks of coquina, a sedimentary rock, were quarried on Anastasia Island and transported on barges to the Castillo.

In April 1671, Cendoya obtained 12,000 pesos in Mexico City to build the fort, as well as acquiring tradesmen, including fifteen masons, stonecutters, lime burners, and plasterers in Havana. The best of the plasterers was Lorenzo Lagunes, who had worked in France, Italy, and Havana, and may have been familiar with treatises on fortification published in Europe; he now served as master of the stonemasons and lime burners. Cendoya chose military engineer Ignacio Daza to supervise construction works on the Castillo; presumably he was responsible for drawing up its plans. To these workers were added 17 soldiers, several Black slaves from Cuba and one hundred and fifty Native American peons to labor at the fort.

On August 8, Cendoya opened the coquina quarries on Anastasia Island, where a sedimentary rock, called coquina by the Spanish and composed of the shells of tiny mollusks, was quarried to construct the Castillo. It was over a year, however, before construction began and the first trenches for the fort's foundations were dug. Native Americans hired as laborers cleared trees and brush from the quarry site and removed topsoil to expose the coquina beneath, working with picks, shovels, and tools forged by the town's blacksmith. Labor gangs of dozens of Indians working virtually as slaves transported the coquina on barges from la isla de la Cantera (Anastasia Island) to the construction site, where others carried firewood and shells to burn the lime for the mortar.

Cendoya even suggested that the Spanish government build four small casemate fortresses: two to guard the entrance to the harbor of St. Augustine, one in Santa Catalina de la Frontera to the north, and another at San Marcos de Apalache to the west, on the Gulf of Mexico. Although the boards of War approved the project, funds were not appropriated.

=== Other Forts and conflicts with the British ===
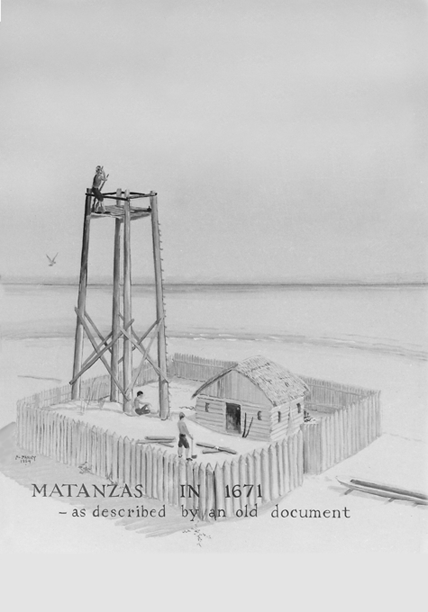
Artist's conception of one of the early wooden watchtowers at Matanzas Inlet, as described in a 1671 document

After receiving reports of numerous threats appearing at Matanzas Inlet, Cendoya began to consider the status of its watchtower, and after personally inspecting the wooden structure himself, formed a plan to build a second masonry fort there. He also sent Captain Matheo Pacheco and twenty-five soldiers to a mission located on St. Catherines Island to establish a garrison and obtain information from the local Indians of activity in the British colonies to the north. Meanwhile, the garrison at Apalache was strengthened to counter the increasing number of raids across the Spanish borderlands made by settlers from the British colonies.

On January 24, 1671, the king ordered Cendoya to announce publicly the Treaty of Madrid with the British, signed on July 7, 1670. Cendoya, however, ignored this order, deciding instead to improve the defenses of the Spanish missions against British attacks, and to maintain military readiness for further British provocations like those made against the Spanish in Florida between 1671 and 1672 (at least from his point of view). Cendoya informed the king in a letter of his decision to continue the struggle against the British. According to him, a group of British colonists was kidnapped on St. Catherines Island. He thought it was too soon to seek a peace agreement with the British and their Native American allies, whose attacks had become increasingly frequent. In February 1673, the Captain General of Havana received an order to assist in the defense of Florida, and sent soldiers to the garrison in Saint Augustine. The Spanish Crown also sent orders to Cendoya to arrange a meeting between him, the Captain General of Havana and the Viceroy of New Spain, to discuss possible ways to drive out the British from Carolina without breaking the peace treaty.

Cendoya died unexpectedly on July 8, 1673, while still in office as governor of Florida, and construction of the Castillo de San Marcos was still in its early stages. A huge storm destroyed the existing wooden fort in 1674. Cendoya was replaced by Nicolás Ponce de León II, who served as acting governor and continued to monitor construction of the fort.

== Personal life ==
Cendoya married and had at least two children.
