= Paul Grimball House Ruins =

Archaeological site in South Carolina, United States

- U.S. National Register of Historic Places
- Nearest city: Edisto Island, South Carolina
- Area: 3.2 acres (1.3 ha)
- Built: 1682; 344 years ago
- MPS: Edisto Island MRA
- NRHP reference No.: 86003190
- Added to NRHP: November 28, 1986

Paul Grimball House Ruins is a historic archaeological site located at Edisto Island, Charleston County, South Carolina. It was the plantation home of Provincial Secretary Paul Grimball and was destroyed in the 1686 Spanish Invasion of South Carolina. The stuccoed tabby house was built about 1682. In August 1686, the house was occupied, sacked, and possibly burned by the Spanish on a raid up the North Edisto River. The remains consist of a 12-foot (3.7 m) high corner portion of a stucco covered tabby wall.

It was listed on the National Register of Historic Places in 1986.
