= Pedro de Aranda y Avellaneda =

Spanish colonial governor

Pedro de Aranda Avellaneda

29th Governor of La Florida
- In office April 11, 1687 – August 20, 1687
- Preceded by: Juan Márquez Cabrera
- Succeeded by: Diego de Quiroga y Losada

Personal details
- Born: 1662 Cádiz (Andalusia, Spain)
- Died: June 21, 1702 (aged 39–40) Havana, Cuba
- Spouse: Josefa de Estrada y Velázquez de Cuéllar
- Profession: Military officer, Alcayde of the fortress of San Salvador de la Punta in Havana, and Governor of Florida (1687)

Pedro de Aranda Avellaneda (1662–1702) was a Spanish military officer who served as acting governor of Spanish Florida between April and August 1687. He was also a Sargento mayor (Sergeant major) of the presidio of San Agustín, and alcayde of the San Salvador de la Punta Fortress in Havana, Cuba.

== Biography ==
Pedro de Aranda Avellaneda was born in 1662, in Cádiz, Spain, to Juan Almario Avellaneda, and María de Aranda y Ponce de León, both also born in Cadiz. He joined the Spanish army in his youth, and was eventually appointed Sargento mayor (Sergeant major) of the presidio of Saint Augustine in La Florida. On April 11, 1687, he was appointed acting governor of Florida, and remained in this office until August 20 of the same year. He was later appointed alcayde of the Castillo San Salvador de la Punta fortress in Havana, Cuba.

On March 24, 1680, Avellaneda married Josefa de Estrada y Velázquez de Cuéllar, the daughter of Capt. Hilario de Estrada y Recio, Procurador general (Attorney general), and Regidor perpetuo del Ayuntamiento (Regidor) of Havana, and his wife Luisa Velázquez de Cuéllar y Mexías. They had 2 children, Antonia and Hilario de Aranda Avellaneda y Estrada. Avellaneda made his will before Juan Uribe Ozeta, Escribano Público (Notary Public) of Havana on November 18, 1699.

Pedro de Aranda y Avellaneda died on June 21, 1702. His remains are in the Cathedral of Havana.
