= Diego de Quiroga y Losada =

Spanish colonial administrator

30th Governor of La Florida
- In office August 20, 1687 – September 21, 1693
- Preceded by: Pedro de Aranda y Avellaneda
- Succeeded by: Laureano de Torres y Ayala

Personal details
- Born: Unknown
- Died: Unknown
- Profession: Governor of Florida

Diego de Quiroga y Losada was the acting Governor of Spanish Florida from 1687 to 1693. His administration was mainly concerned with building fortifications, including the Castillo de San Marcos, which his predecessors began to defend La Florida against British and French attacks by land and water.

== Career ==
On August 20, 1687, Diego de Quiroga y Losada was appointed acting governor of Florida, and remained in that position until September 21, 1693. That same month (August, 1687), eleven escaped African slaves from the Province of Carolina, including an infant, arrived by boat at the Franciscan Mission of Santa María de Sena on present-day Amelia Island in Florida, seeking a better life. Soldiers garrisoned there sent word to St. Augustine, informing Quiroga of their arrival so that he could decide what to do with them. In October, the governor ordered the Africans brought to St. Augustine. Once they were in the presidio, he put the men to work on construction of the Castillo de San Marcos, and the two women became a part of his household. Quiroga assigned several Spanish families responsibility for assisting the priests in Christianizing them.

Later in 1687, Quiroga visited the Apalachee Province to assess the strategic situation there, and upon his return to St. Augustine, ordered Captain Primo de Rivera to build a Casa fuerte (blockhouse) on the Chattahoochee River to protect the province from British incursions. The location was chosen because of its nearness to the head town of the Apalachicola Province. Quiroga sent one hundred Native Americans, many of them trained as carpenters, with Rivera to build the fort as quickly as possible. Quiroga ordered the construction of Fort Apalachicola without seeking the King's permission, "because English traders had begun to settle and conduct business with local Native American groups immediately north of Spanish missions".

In the spring of 1690, Lieutenant Favian de Angulo traveled to Chattahoochee to command the garrison. Based on a letter sent by Angulo to Quiroga, at the time the garrison consisted of 17 regulars and 20 Apalachee Native Americans. Despite Angulo's warnings about trading with the English, the Indians continued to trade with them and soon the town surrounding the fort was abandoned. Angulo then demolished the fort and took away food, weapons, and anything else that might be useful to the Carolina merchants. The lieutenant and the Spaniards abandoned the area. In 1690, Quiroga y Losada began selling coquina from the royal quarry on Anastasia Island to the garrison soldiers and the other townspeople for building houses or other structures.

In 1690, Quiroga saw that with the high tides, the sea was beginning to flood Saint Augustine, threatening to inundate its houses and the fortress. To prevent this encroachment, he met with the leading men of the town and proposed the construction of a sea wall. The inhabitants approved his proposal and started to build the wall with two thousand dollars donated by the local soldiers, who were themselves owed back pay.

Diego de Quiroga complained in 1693 that the church bells of Saint Augustine were too loud and rung too often, saying that their noise would drown out the alarm bell at the garrison's guardhouse. The largest, loudest bell of the four in the belltower was subsequently replaced with a smaller altar bell.

On September 21, 1693 Quiroga y Losada was replaced by Laureano de Torres y Ayala as Governor of Florida.
