= 1686 Spanish Invasion of South Carolina =

1686 conflict between Spanish Florida and English Carolina

- Map of South Carolina coast from the 1711 Crisp Map, Paul Grimball's name is listed among the prominent families on Edisto, where his home was burned
Date	August 1686
Location	Stuart's Town, Port Royale Island, Province of Carolina 32.4157°N 80.6890°W
Result	Burning of Stuart's Town & subsequent Spanish withdrawal

Belligerents
Province of Carolina; Yamasee	Spanish Florida; Timucua

Commanders and leaders
Paul Grimball	Capt. Tomás de León

Strength
~10-25 local militia ~2-4 wall guns ~2-3 swivel guns	3 galleys ~100 spanish soldiers ~50 native soldiers ~3-6 swivel guns

Casualties and losses
~10-20 killed	minimal losses

The 1686 Spanish Invasion of South Carolina was a conflict between Spanish Florida and the Province of Carolina and their native allies. The Spanish excursion into Carolina culminated with the destruction of Stuart's Town, and the destruction and looting of the surrounding area of Beaufort, South Carolina.

== Background ==
Stuart's Town was established in 1684 by Scottish protestants in what is today Beaufort, South Carolina. Soon after their establishment in the area, the settlers allied with the Yamasee peoples who were native to South Carolina. In this alliance, the colonists agreed to help them raid and attack the Timucua who were a historical enemy of the Yamasee. This caused issue with the Spanish in florida because they had been allied with the Timucua. Angered by their allied being attacked by British colonists, Juan Márquez Cabrera ordered a counter attack on the Province of Carolina. The Spanish aimed to invade the whole colony, starting with some of the southern most colonies around what is today Beaufort, South Carolina, where the Yamasee and their settler allies were based.

== 1686 Invasion ==
In late August of 1686, in response to the prior encroachments, Capt. de León led his force on 3 Spanish galleys, traveling north towards Carolina. The population fled, but the town was burned. They planned to attack Charles Town next but a hurricane disrupted their plans and forced them to return to St. Augustine.

== Aftermath ==
After the destruction of Stuart's Town, the Colonial government including Morton and Vice Admiral Blake, in Charles Town debated a counter attack but was restrained by the government in England, which did not want a larger conflict with Spain. Grimball’s ruined plantation home still stands as a park at the Paul Grimball House Ruins.
