= Spanish Coquina Quarries =

- U.S. National Register of Historic Places
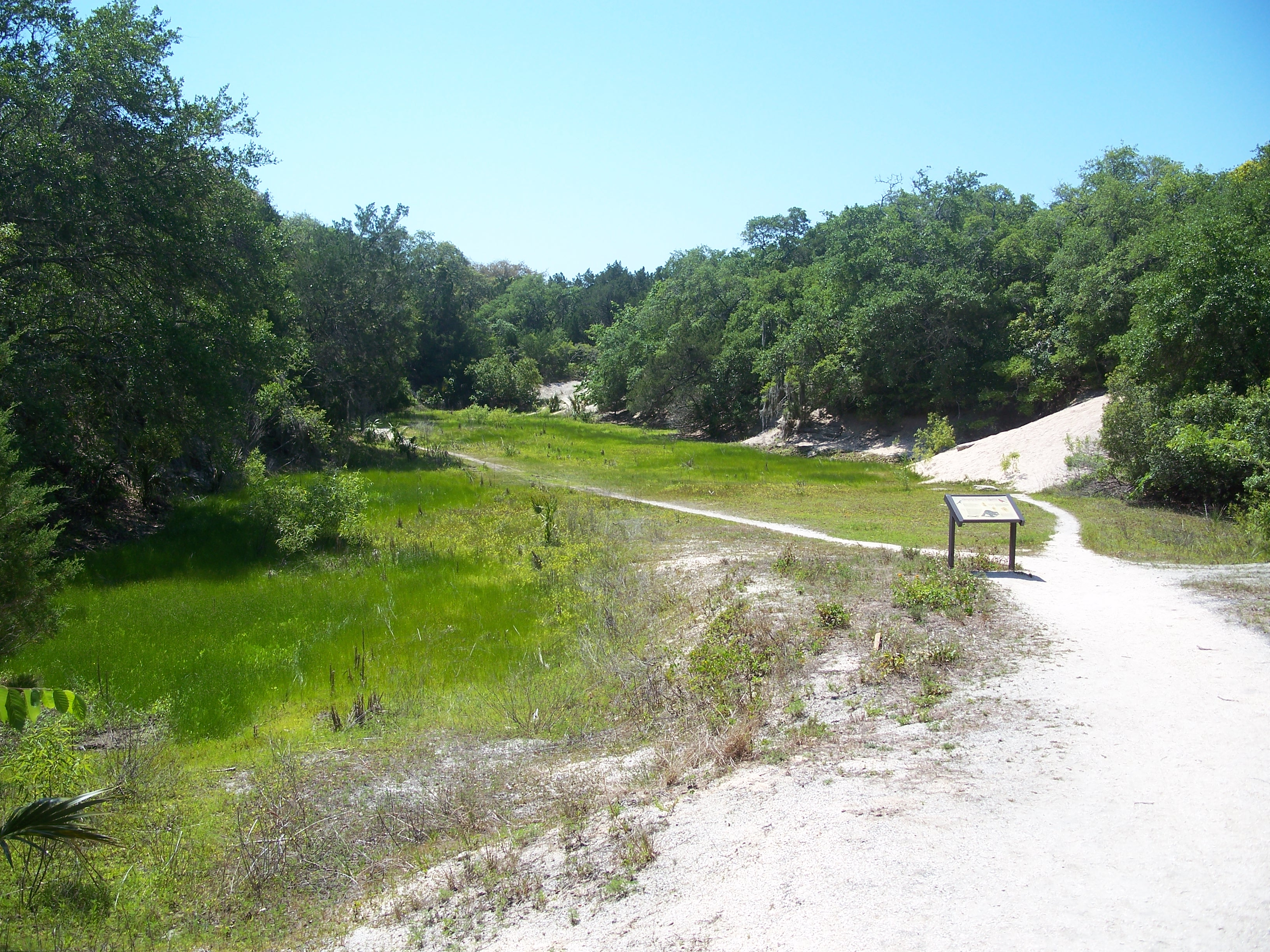

- Location within Florida Location within the United States
- Location: St. Augustine Beach, Florida
- Coordinates: 29°52′14″N 81°16′31″W
- NRHP reference No.: 72001462
- Added to NRHP: February 23, 1972

The Spanish Coquina Quarries are a historic site in St. Augustine Beach, Florida. They are situated off A1A within Anastasia State Park. The quarries were added to the National Register of Historic Places in 1972.
