= Paul Grimball =

South Carolina state representative and Justice

- Grimball family coat of arms

Secretary of the Province of Carolina
- In office 1695–1696
- In office 1684–1692

Receiver General and Escheator of the Province of Carolina
- In office 1687–1696

Deputy Secretary of the Province of Carolina
- In office 1683–1684

Lord Proprietors' Deputy on the Grand Council of Carolina
- In office 1683–1696

Assistant Justice of Berkeley District
- In office 1682–1683

Province of Carolina Commissioner for Land Grants
- In office 1682–1686

Personal details
- Born: 1640 Wales
- Died: 20 February 1696 (aged 55–56) Edisto Island, Province of Carolina
- Spouse: Mary Stoney
- Children: 5
- Occupation: Politician; Planter class

Military service
- Battles/wars: 1686 Spanish Invasion of South Carolina

Paul Grimball was a British-American politician and settler in the Province of Carolina during the seventeenth century. He organized resistance to the 1686 Spanish Invasion of South Carolina and was a prominent member of the low country gentry of the time.

== Early life & Family ==
Paul Grimball was born in Wales in 1640 to Thomas Grimball and Elizabeth Adams. He immigrated to what is today South Carolina around 1682 alongside his parents, and received vast landholdings which they turned into plantations. He married his wife Mary Stoney in 1662 and they would have five children together.

== Political career ==
Once arriving in the Province of Carolina, he almost immediately began holding positions in local colonial governance, including commissioner for land grants, assistant justice, deputy to the Grand Council of Carolina, deputy secretary and secretary of the province, and receiver general and escheator for the province. He is listed in several records of the time as being a senior member of local government, held in high regard by his peers.

== 1686 Spanish Invasion ==
In late August 1686, a detachment of Spanish soldiers sailed from St. Augustine, Florida and raided what is today South Carolina. They sacked several plantations, including Grimball's, carrying away enslaved people, supplies, and goods, virtually looting the entirety of it. The Spanish advance was halted by a hurricane that caused them to retreat back to Spanish Florida. During this Grimball led and organized the local militia, helping organize other plantation homes.

== Later life & Legacy ==
Grimball died in 1696, leaving behind 5 children and a vast estate for them to inherit. His grandson was Paul Hamilton (representative) and his 2nd great-grandson was Paul Hamilton (politician). His ruined plantation home still stands as a park at the Paul Grimball House Ruins.
