= Castillo de San Marcos =

- Castillo de San Marcos National Monument
- U.S. National Register of Historic Places
- U.S. National Monument
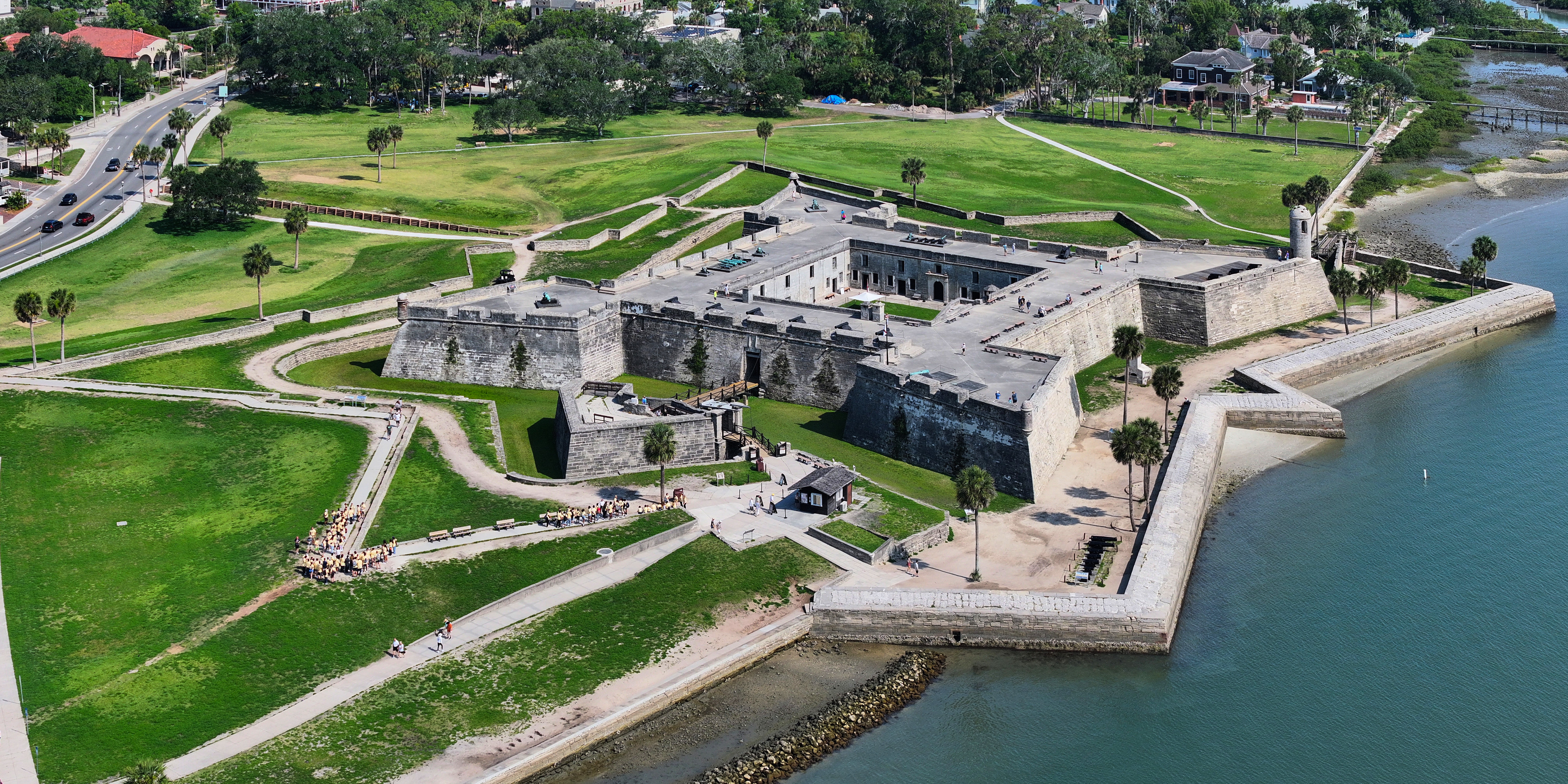
- Aerial view of Castillo De San Marcos

- Location within Florida Location within the United States
- Location: 11 South Castillo Drive; St. Augustine, Florida
- Coordinates: 29°53′52″N 81°18′41″W
- Area: 20.48 acres (8.29 ha)
- Built: 1672–1695
- Visitation: 624,841 (2022)
- Website: Castillo de San Marcos National Monument
- Part of: St. Augustine Town Plan Historic District (ID70000847)
- NRHP reference No.: 66000062

Significant dates
- Added to NRHP: October 15, 1966
- Designated NMON: October 15, 1924

The Castillo de San Marcos (Spanish for “St. Mark’s Castle”) is the oldest masonry fort in the continental United States; it is located on the western shore of Matanzas Bay in St. Augustine, Florida.

It was designed by the Spanish engineer Ignacio Daza, with construction beginning in 1672, 107 years after the city's founding by Spanish Admiral and conquistador Pedro Menéndez de Avilés, when Florida was part of the Spanish Empire. The fort's construction was ordered by Governor Francisco de la Guerra y de la Vega after a raid by the English privateer Robert Searles in 1668 that destroyed much of St. Augustine and damaged the existing wooden fort. Work proceeded under the administration of Guerra's successor, Manuel de Cendoya in 1671, and the first coquina stones were laid in 1672. The construction of the core of the current fortress was completed in 1695, although it would undergo many alterations and renovations over the centuries.

When Britain gained control of Florida in 1763 pursuant to the Treaty of Paris, St. Augustine became the capital of British East Florida, and the fort was renamed Fort St. Mark until the Peace of Paris (1783) when Florida was transferred back to Spain and the fort's original name restored. In 1819, Spain signed the Adams–Onís Treaty which ceded Florida to the United States in 1821; consequently, the fort was designated a United States Army base and renamed Fort Marion, in honor of American Revolutionary War hero Francis Marion. The fort was declared a National Monument in 1924, and after 251 years of continuous military possession, was deactivated in 1933. The 20.48-acre (8.29 ha) site was subsequently turned over to the United States National Park Service. In 1942 the original name, Castillo de San Marcos, was restored by an Act of Congress.

Castillo de San Marcos was attacked several times and twice besieged: first by English colonial forces led by Carolina Colony Governor James Moore in 1702, and then by English Georgia colonial Governor James Oglethorpe in 1740. However, possession of the fort has changed five times, all peaceful, among four different governments: Spain, 1695–1763 and 1783–1821, Kingdom of Great Britain, 1763–1783, and the United States, 1821–date (during 1861–1865, under control of the Confederate States of America). Owing to its strategic cannon placement and star-shaped design, the fort was never breached or taken by force throughout its various stages of sovereign ownership.

Under United States control the fort was used as a military prison to incarcerate members of Native American tribes starting with the Seminole—including the famous war chief, Osceola, in the Second Seminole War—and members of western tribes, including Geronimo's band of Chiricahua Apache. The Native American art form known as Ledger Art had its origins at the fort during the imprisonment of members of the Plains tribes such as Howling Wolf of the southern Cheyenne.

Although built in part by African slaves owned by the Spanish, the fort later served as one of the first entry points of fugitive slaves from British North America into Spanish Florida, where they were freed by the Spanish colonial authorities. This quickly led to the first free Black settlement in the future United States (Fort Mose, formed just north of St Augustine).

Ownership of the Castillo was transferred to the National Park Service in 1933, and, along with the nearby St. Augustine Historic District, has been a popular tourist destination ever since.

== Structure ==
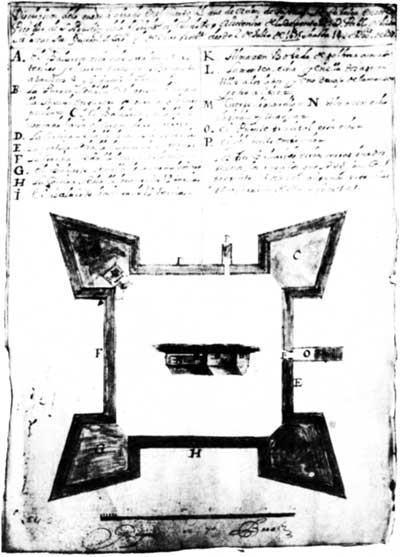
Construction plan of the Castillo de San Marcos (1677).

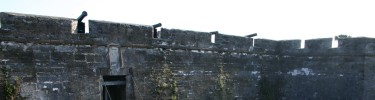
The barrels of cannons deployed on the terreplein project outward through multiple embrasures located along the curtain wall between San Pedro and San Agustín bastions. To the left of center is the sallyport—the only entrance to the fort, reached via drawbridge from the ravelin, which is located within the moat.

The European city of St. Augustine was founded by the admiral Pedro Menéndez de Avilés for the Spanish Crown in 1565 on the site of a former Native American village called Seloy.

The need for fortifications was recognized after it was attacked by Sir Francis Drake and his fleet of 22 ships in 1586, and over the next 80 years, a succession of nine wooden forts were built in various locations along the coastline. After an attack in 1668 by the English pirate Robert Searle, however, during which the town of St. Augustine was burned to the ground, wooden forts were deemed inadequate, and Mariana, Queen Regent of Spain, approved the construction of a masonry fortification to protect the city.

The Castillo is a masonry star fort made of a stone called coquina (Spanish for "small shells"), which consists of ancient shells that have bonded together to form a sedimentary rock similar to limestone. Native Americans from Spain's nearby missions did most of the labor, with additional skilled workers brought in from Havana, Cuba. The coquina was quarried from the 'King's Quarry' on Anastasia Island in what is today Anastasia State Park across Matanzas Bay from the Castillo, and ferried across to the construction site. Construction began on October 2, 1672 (353 years ago) and lasted twenty-three years, with completion in 1695.

The fort has four bastions named San Pedro, San Agustín, San Carlos, and San Pablo, with a ravelin protecting the sally port. On the two landward sides, a large glacis was constructed which would force any attackers to advance upward toward the fort's cannon and allow the cannon shot to proceed downslope for greater efficiency in hitting multiple targets. Also, the artificial mound of the glacis in front of the walls helped to protect them from direct cannon fire attempting to breach them in a siege. Immediately surrounding the fort was a moat which was usually kept dry, but that could be flooded with seawater to a depth of about one foot (30 cm) in case of attack by land.

Multiple embrasures were built into the curtain wall along the top of the fort as well as into the bastions for the deployment of a cannon of various calibers. Infantry embrasures were also built into the walls below the level of the terreplein for the deployment of muskets by the fort's defenders. It was through one of these embrasures that twenty Seminoles held as prisoners would escape in 1837.

== History ==
=== First English siege ===
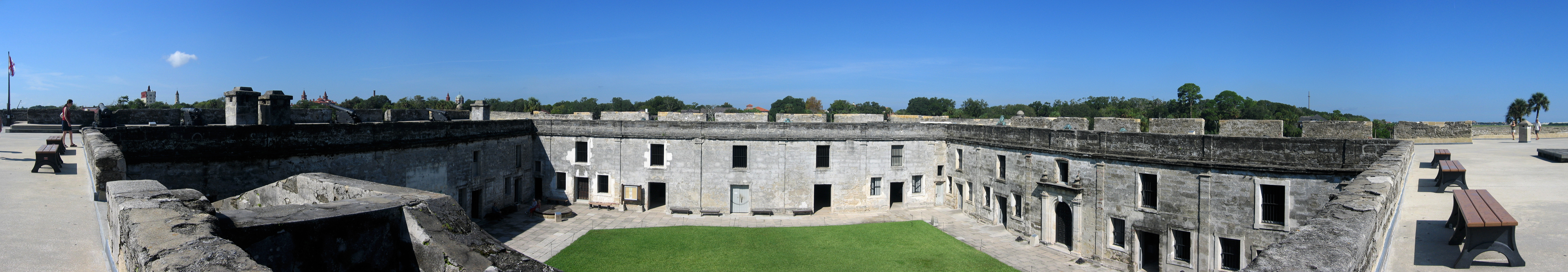
View of the Plaza de Armas within Castillo de San Marcos

In 1670, Charles Town (modern-day Charleston, South Carolina) was founded by English colonists. As it was just two days' sail from St. Augustine, the English settlement and encroachment of English traders into Spanish territory spurred the Spanish in their construction of a fort.

Slaves from the Carolina colony began escaping to St Augustine in 1687, where the Spanish agreed to free (and employ) them if they converted to Catholicism. When an English major from Carolina attempted to retrieve escapees in 1688, the Spanish Governor Diego de Quiroga refused. Charles II of Spain issued an official policy in 1693, cementing the informal practice.

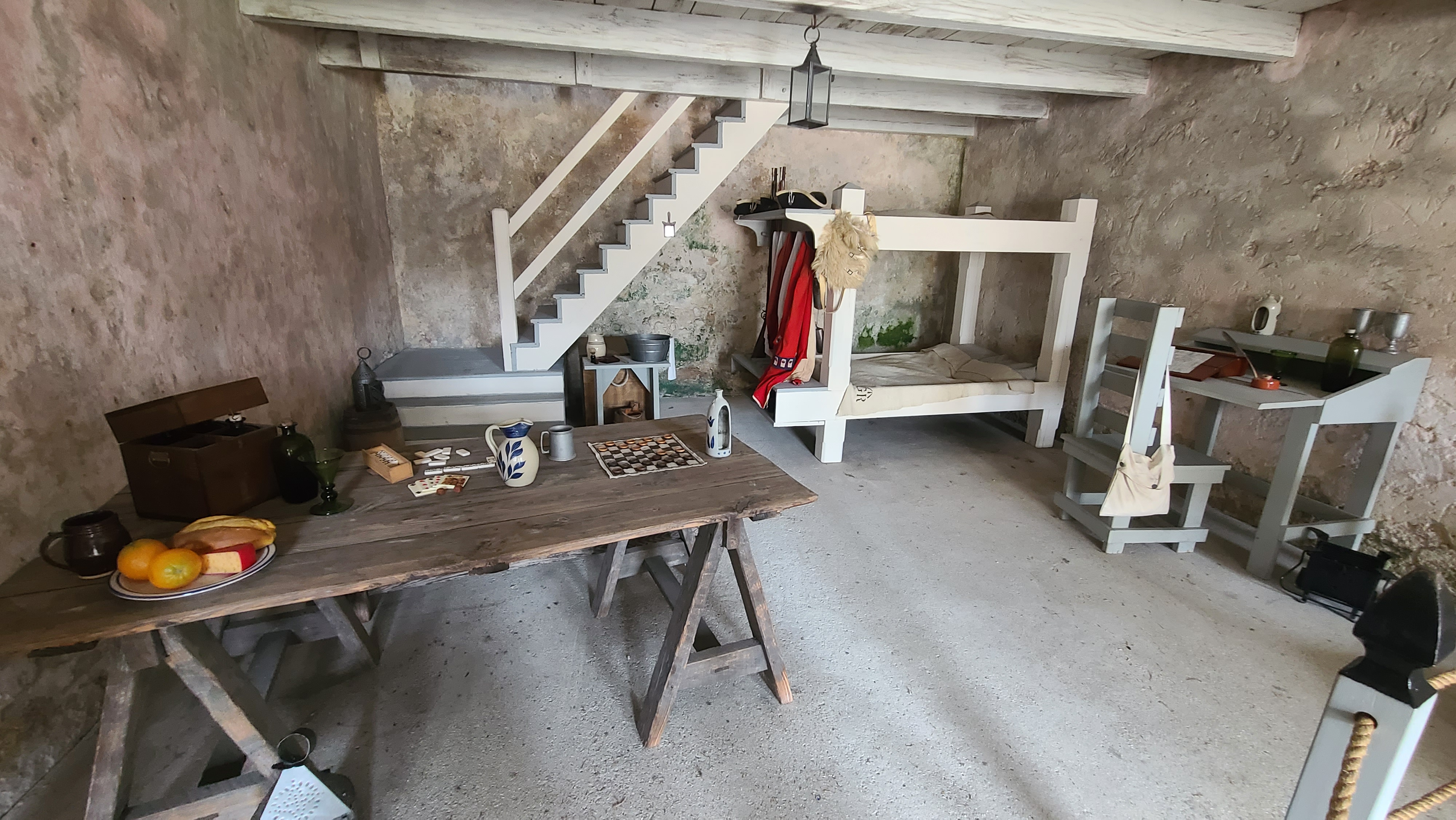
Typical living quarters of a soldier at Castillo de San Marcos, down beneath the stone.

In 1702, English colonial forces under the command of Carolina Governor James Moore Sr. embarked on an expedition to capture St. Augustine early in Queen Anne's War. The English laid siege to St. Augustine in November 1702. About 1,500 town residents and soldiers were crammed into the fort during the two-month siege. The small English cannons had little effect on the walls of the fort, because the coquina masonry was very effective at absorbing the impact of cannonballs causing them to sink into the walls, rather than shattering or puncturing them.

The siege was broken when the Spanish fleet from Havana arrived, trapping some English vessels in the bay. The English decided to burn their ships to prevent them from falling under Spanish control, and then marched overland back to Carolina. The town of St. Augustine was destroyed, in part by the Spanish and in part by the English, as a result of the siege.

=== Second period of construction ===
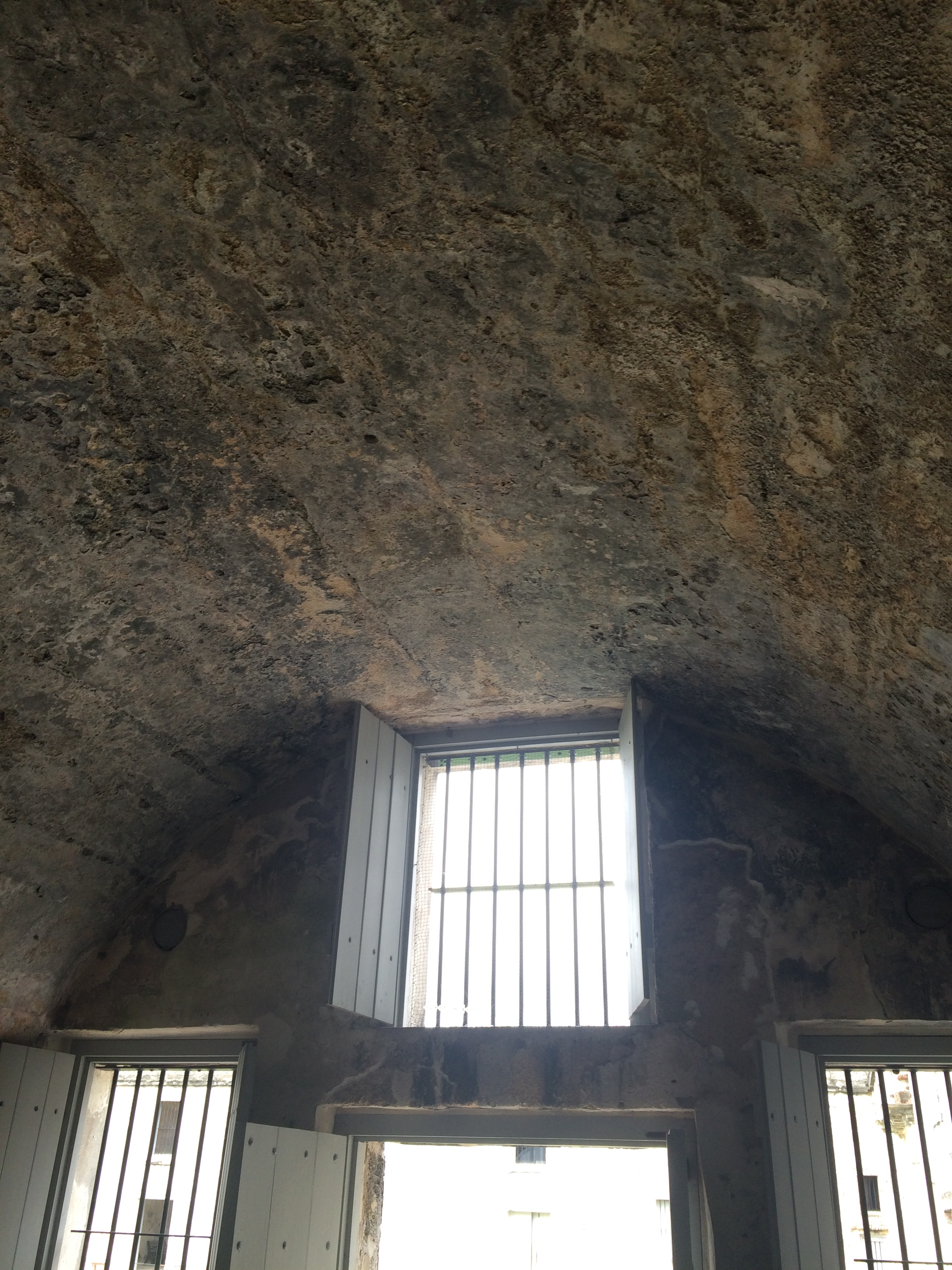
Interior vaulted ceiling.

Beginning in 1738, under the supervision of Spanish engineer Pedro Ruiz de Olano, the interior of the fort was redesigned and rebuilt. Interior rooms were made deeper, and vaulted ceilings replaced the original wooden ones. The vaulted ceilings allowed for better protection from bombardments and allowed for cannon to be placed along the gun deck, not just at the corner bastions. The new ceilings required the height of the exterior wall to be increased from 26 to 33 feet (10 m).

=== Second British siege ===
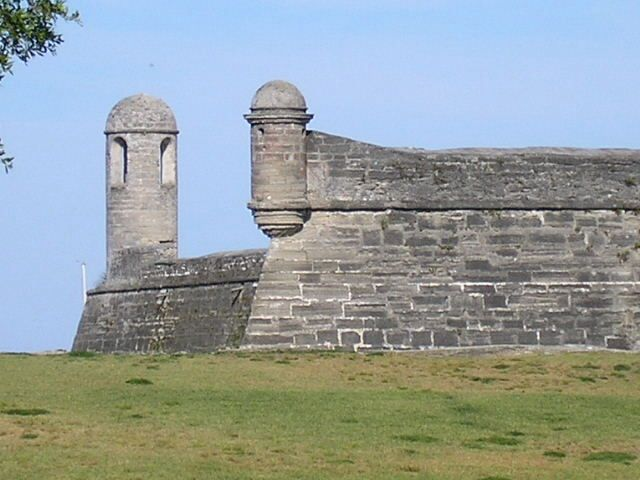
The tallest watchtower at the fort is at the corner facing the outlet to the Atlantic Ocean.

Spain and Britain were rivals in Europe, and since the two countries had both founded empires in the New World, their rivalry continued there as well. In 1733, the British merchantmen Rebecca, commanded by Captain Robert Jenkins, was seized in the Caribbean by the Spanish coast guard. Suspecting that Rebecca had been trading illegally with Spanish colonies (which was forbidden by both Spain and Britain), the Spanish searched the ship. A fight broke out between the Spanish and British sailors. In the skirmish, Jenkins had his ear cut off by a Spanish officer, who picked it up and said "Take this to your king and tell him that if he were here I would serve him in the same manner!" When Jenkins reported the incident to British authorities, they used it as a casus belli to declare war on Spain in 1739. The war was called the War of Jenkins' Ear.

After British Admiral Edward Vernon won a significant victory at Portobelo, General James Oglethorpe, the founder of Georgia, was quick to imitate him in North America. In June 1740, Oglethorpe and a British fleet of seven ships appeared off St. Augustine. As in the 1702 siege, three hundred soldiers and 1,300 residents found refuge within the Castillo's walls. For 27 days the British bombarded the Castillo and St. Augustine. Realizing his cannon were not affecting the Castillo's walls of coquina, Oglethorpe decided to starve the people of St. Augustine into submission by blockading the inlet at the Matanzas River and all roads into St. Augustine. However, some supplies were able to reach the city via the river, and with morale and supplies low for the British forces, Oglethorpe had to retreat. In order to protect the city from future blockades and sieges, the Spanish built Fort Matanzas to guard the river, which could be used as a rear entrance to avoid St. Augustine's primary defense system.

=== British occupation ===
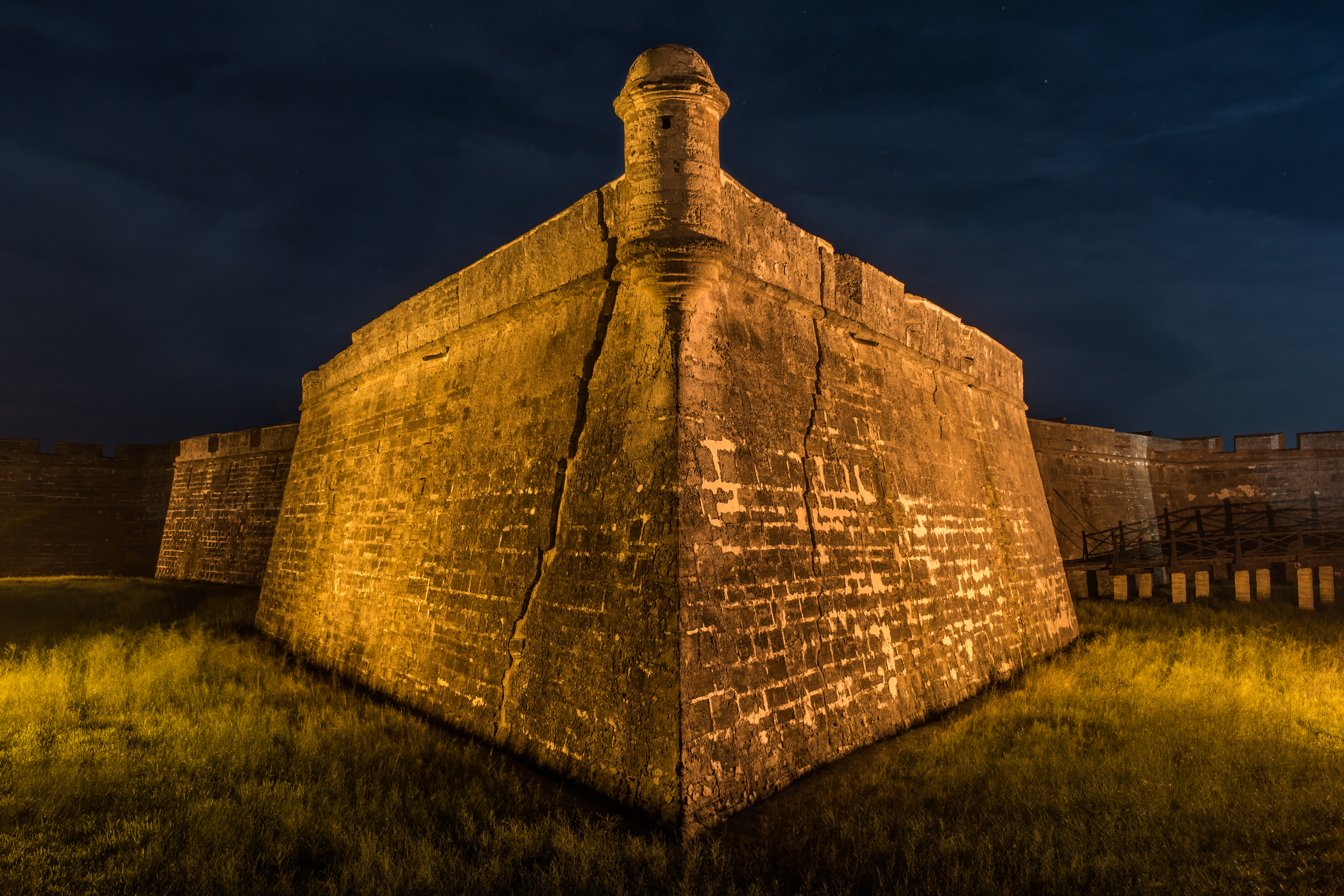
The San Pablo Bastion at night

In 1763, the British managed to take control of the Castillo but not by force. As a provision of the Treaty of Paris (1763) after the Seven Years' War, Britain gained all of Spanish Florida in exchange for returning Havana and Manila to Spain. On July 21, 1763, the Spanish governor turned the Castillo over to the British, who established St. Augustine as the capital of the province of East Florida, established by the Royal Proclamation of 1763.

The British made some changes to the fort, and renamed it Fort St. Mark. As Great Britain was the dominant power in North America, they were not worried about keeping the fort in top condition. This attitude prevailed until the outbreak of the American Revolutionary War. The fort was used as a military prison during the war. Among those imprisoned was Christopher Gadsden, the Lieutenant governor of South Carolina. He was also a delegate to the Continental Congress and a brigadier general in the Continental Army during the war. He was released after 11 months.

Improvements were begun on the fort, in keeping with its new role as a base of operations for the British in the South. The gates and walls were repaired, and second floors were added to several rooms to increase the housing capacity of the fort. The Castillo saw action during the American Revolution mainly as a prison, although St. Augustine was targeted by several aborted expeditions from Georgia. Several revolutionary fighters who had been captured in Charleston were held there when it was taken by the British, including three Founding Fathers; Thomas Heyward Jr., Arthur Middleton, and Edward Rutledge. The Spanish declared war on Britain in 1779, drawing off forces from Fort St. Mark and keeping the British occupied. Bernardo de Gálvez, governor of Spanish Louisiana, attacked several British-held cities in West Florida, capturing all of them. The only major British operation that used troops from St. Augustine was the poorly coordinated but successful capture of Savannah, Georgia; the city was taken by troops from New York before those from St. Augustine arrived.

At the end of the war, the Peace of Paris (1783) called for the return of Florida to Spain. On July 12, 1784, Spanish troops returned to St. Augustine.

=== Second Spanish period ===
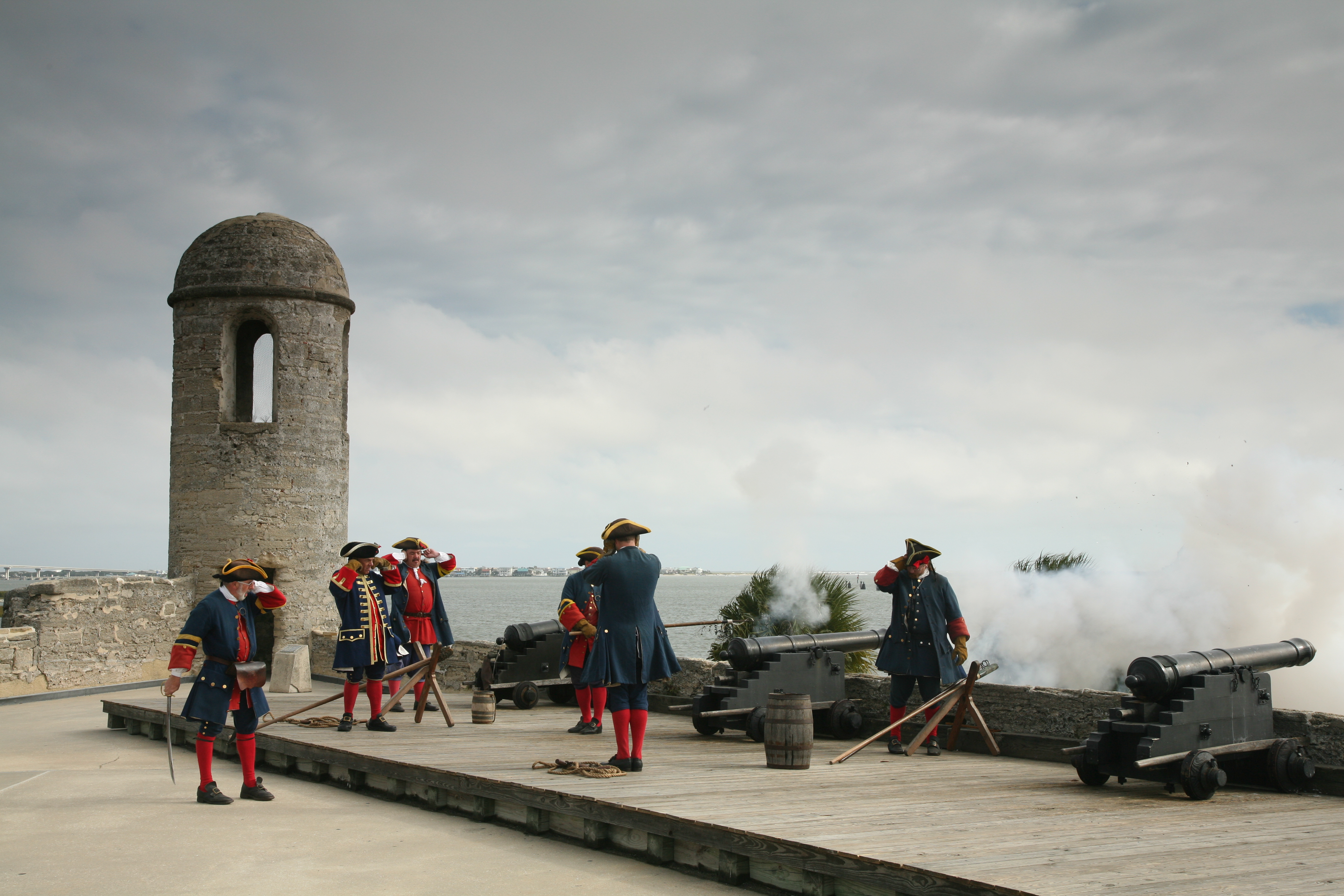
Reenactment of Spanish soldiers firing cannons.

When Spain regained control over Florida they found a much-changed territory. Many Spaniards had left Florida after the handover to Britain, and many British citizens stayed after it was returned to Spain. Many border problems arose between Spanish Florida and the new United States. Spain changed the name of the fort back to the Castillo de San Marcos, and continued to build upon the improvements that Britain had made to the fort in an effort to strengthen Spain's hold on the territory. However, due to increased pressure from the United States and several other factors, in 1819 Spain signed the Adams–Onís Treaty, ceding Florida to the United States, which was transferred in 1821.

=== First United States period ===
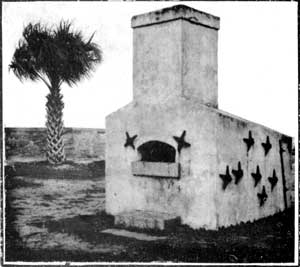
Spanish-colonial-era hotshot furnace used to heat cannonballs to shoot at wooden enemy ships.

Upon receiving the fort from Spain, the Americans changed its name to Fort Marion. It was named to honor General Francis Marion, an American Revolutionary War hero nicknamed "The Swamp Fox." Structurally, the Americans made few changes to the fort during this time. Many storerooms were converted to prison cells on account of their heavy doors and barred windows. Also, part of the moat was filled in and transformed into an artillery battery as part of the American coastal defense system. The original Spanish seawall was dismantled to ground level and a new seawall constructed immediately adjacent to the seaward side of the original. At this time a hotshot furnace was also built in the filled-in section of the moat behind the newly built water battery. Cannonballs were heated in the furnace to fire at wooden enemy ships.

In October 1837, during the Second Seminole War, Seminole chief Osceola was taken prisoner by the Americans while attending a peace conference near Fort Peyton under a flag of truce. He was imprisoned in Fort Marion along with his followers, including Uchee Billy, King Philip and his son Coacoochee (Wild Cat), and then transported to Fort Moultrie on Sullivan's Island in Charleston's harbor. Uchee Billy was captured on September 10, 1837, and he died at the fort on November 29. His skull was kept as a curio by Frederick Weedon. The doctor also decapitated Osceola after his death in Fort Moultrie and kept the head in preservative.

On November 19, 1837, Coacoochee and nineteen other Seminole, including two women, escaped from Fort Marion. Coacoochee, known for fabricating entertaining stories, later said that only he and his friend Talmus Hadjo had escaped - by squeezing through the eight-inch (203 mm) opening of the embrasure located high in their cell and sliding down a makeshift rope into the dry moat. Hadjo, however, was not on the official list of prisoners. However the Seminole escaped, they made their way to their band's encampment at the headwaters of the Tomoka River, about forty miles south of St. Augustine. Because of their having been poorly treated, they vowed to continue fighting, and the war was prolonged for four more years. The cell from which Coacoochee escaped was long part of the official lore of the fort.

=== Confederate States period ===
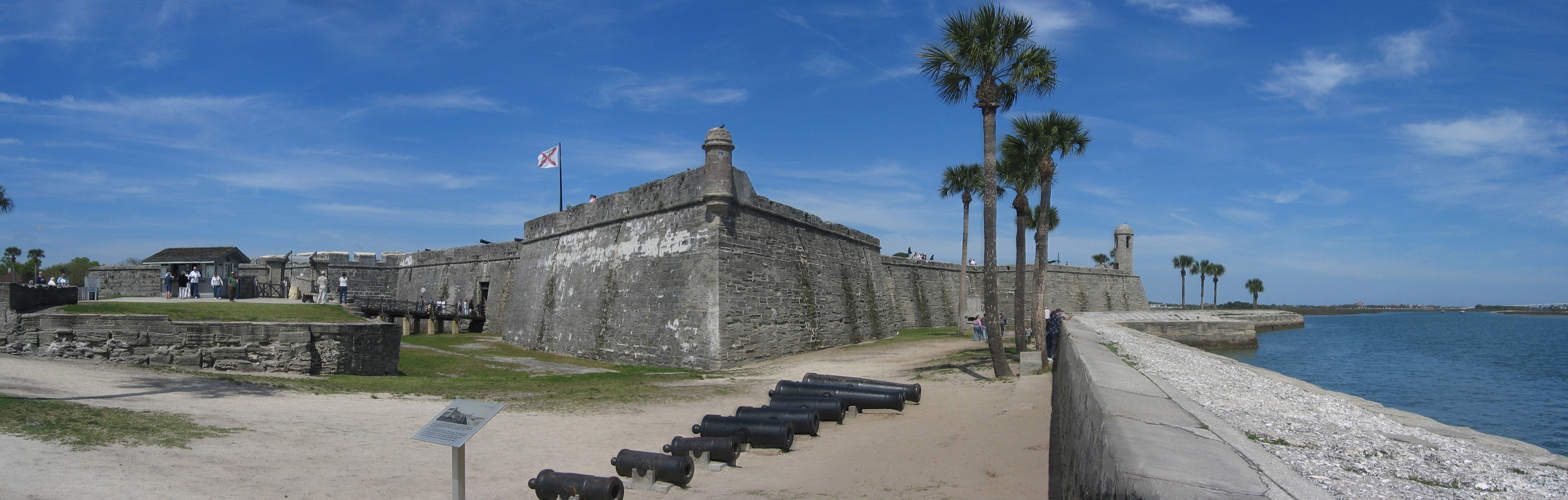

In January 1861, Florida seceded from the United States in the opening months of the American Civil War. Union troops had withdrawn from the fort, leaving only one man behind as caretaker. On January 7, 1861, three days before Florida seceded, 125 militiamen marched on the fort by the order of Governor Madison S. Perry. The Union soldier manning the fort refused to surrender it unless he was given a receipt for it from the Confederacy. He was given the receipt, and the fort was taken by the Confederacy without a shot. General Robert E. Lee, then in command of the coastal defenses of South Carolina, Georgia, and East Florida, ordered that most of the artillery in the fort be sent to other, more strategic, forts. This left only five cannons in the water battery to defend Fort Marion.

The Saint Augustine Blues, a militia unit formed in St. Augustine, were enrolled into the Confederate Army at Ft. Marion on August 5, 1861. They were assigned to the recently organized Third Florida Infantry as its Company B. More than a dozen former members of the St. Augustine Blues are buried in a row at the city's Tolomato Cemetery. Men from the unit were most likely part of the force that originally occupied the fort on January 7, 1861.

The fort, along with the rest of the city of St. Augustine, was reoccupied by Union troops after acting mayor Cristobal Bravo officially surrendered the city to Union Navy fleet commander Christopher Raymond Perry Rodgers on March 11, 1862. The Confederate forces left the city the previous evening in anticipation of the arrival of the Union fleet under the command of Commodore Dupont.

=== Second United States period ===
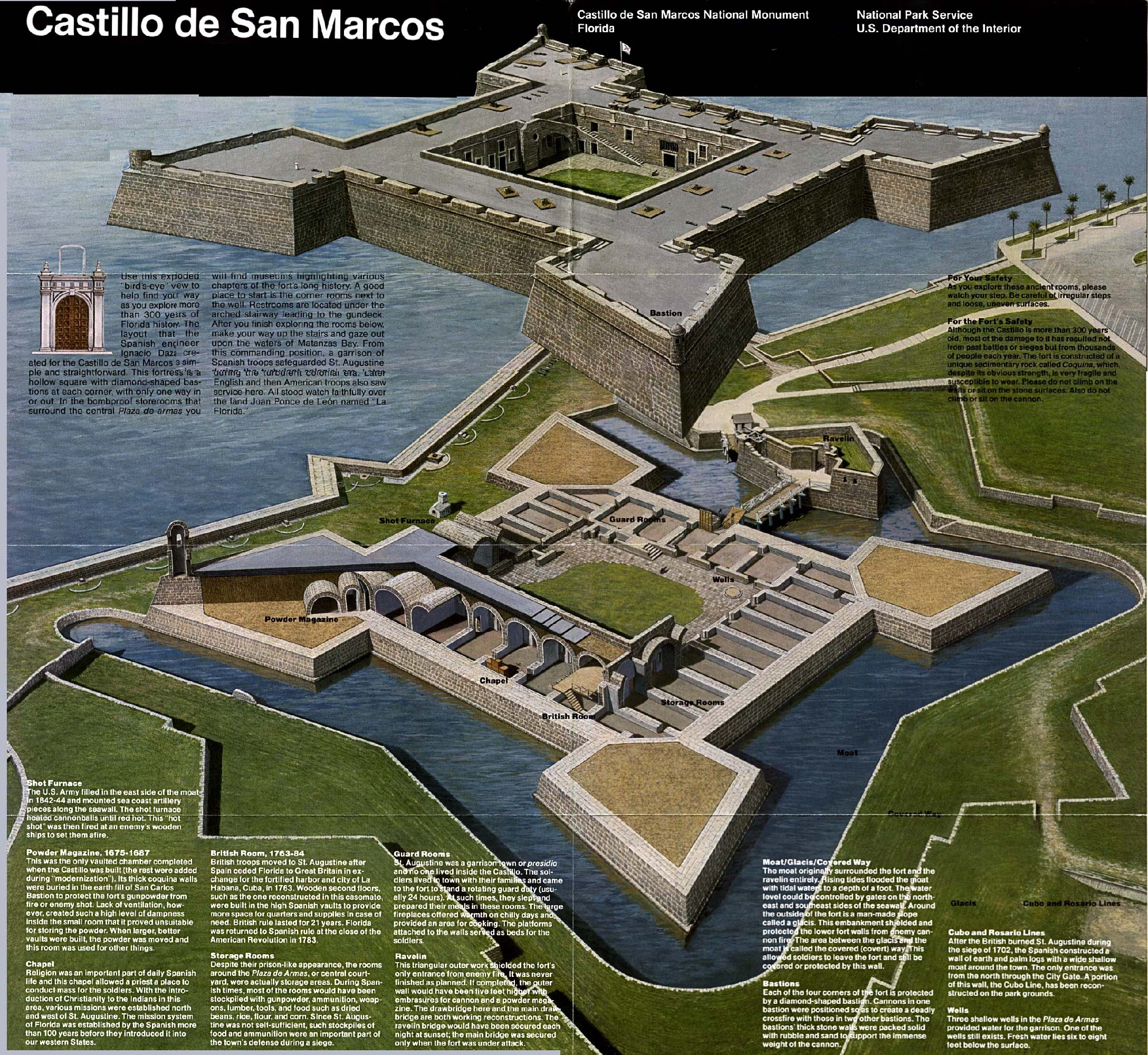
National Park Service brochure showing an exploded view drawing of fort.

The fort was taken back by Union forces on March 11, 1862, when the USS Wabash entered the bay, finding the city evacuated by Confederate troops. The city leaders were willing to surrender in order to preserve the town, and the city and the fort were retaken without firing a shot. Throughout the rest of the fort's operational history, it was used as a military prison.

Beginning in 1875, numerous Native American prisoners were held at the fort in the aftermath of the Indian Wars in the west. Many would die at the fort. Among the captives were Chief White Horse of the Kiowa, and Chief Grey Beard of the southern Cheyenne.

During this period, Richard Henry Pratt, a Civil War veteran, supervised the prisoners and upgraded the conditions for them. He removed the prisoners' shackles and allowed them out of the casemates where they had been confined. He developed ways to give the men more autonomy and attempted to organize educational and cultural programs for them. They became a center of interest to northerners vacationing in St. Augustine, who included teachers and missionaries. Pratt recruited volunteers to teach the Indian prisoners English, the Christian religion, and elements of American culture. He and most US officials believed that such assimilation was needed for the Indians' survival in the changing society.

The men were also encouraged to make art; they created hundreds of drawings. Some of the collection of Ledger Art by Fort Marion artists is held by the Smithsonian Institution. It may be viewed online.

Encouraged by the men's progress in education, residents and visitors to St. Augustine raised funds for scholarships to support nearly 20 of the former prisoners in college after they were released from Ft. Marion. Seventeen men attended the Hampton Institute, a historically black college established in 1868 for freedmen by the American Missionary Association.

Others were sponsored and educated in New York State at private colleges. Among the latter were David Pendleton Oakerhater, as he became known, who was sponsored by US Senator George H. Pendleton (D-OH) and his wife. Oakerhater studied and later was ordained as an Episcopal priest. He returned to the West to work as a missionary with Indian tribes. He was later recognized by the Episcopal Church as a saint.

Pratt's experiences at Fort Marion were the basis for his campaign to create American Indian boarding schools. He was authorized to found the Carlisle Indian Industrial School in 1879, which became a model for other government-funded boarding schools established by the Bureau of Indian Affairs. It operated until 1918. At their peak, some 350-450 schools were established, and only 25 were off-reservation.

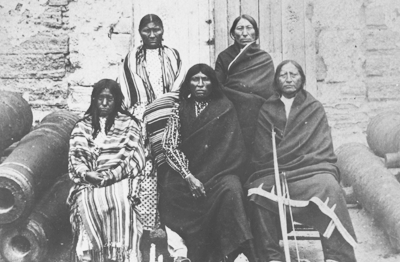
Apache prisoners at Ft. Marion

From 1886 to 1887, approximately 491 Apaches were held prisoner at Fort Marion; many were of the Chiricahua and Warm Springs Apache bands from Arizona. There were 82 men and the rest were women and children. Among the men, 14, including Chatto, had previously been paid scouts for the US Army. Among the Chiricahua were members of the notable chief Geronimo's band, including his wife. Geronimo was sent to Fort Pickens, in violation of his agreed terms of surrender. While at the fort, many of the prisoners had to camp in tents, as there was not sufficient space for them. At least 24 Apache died as prisoners and were buried in North Beach.

In 1898, over 200 deserters from the Spanish–American War were imprisoned at the fort. This marked one of the last uses of the fort as an operational base. In 1900, the fort was taken off the active duty rolls after 205 years of service under five different flags.

=== Preservation ===
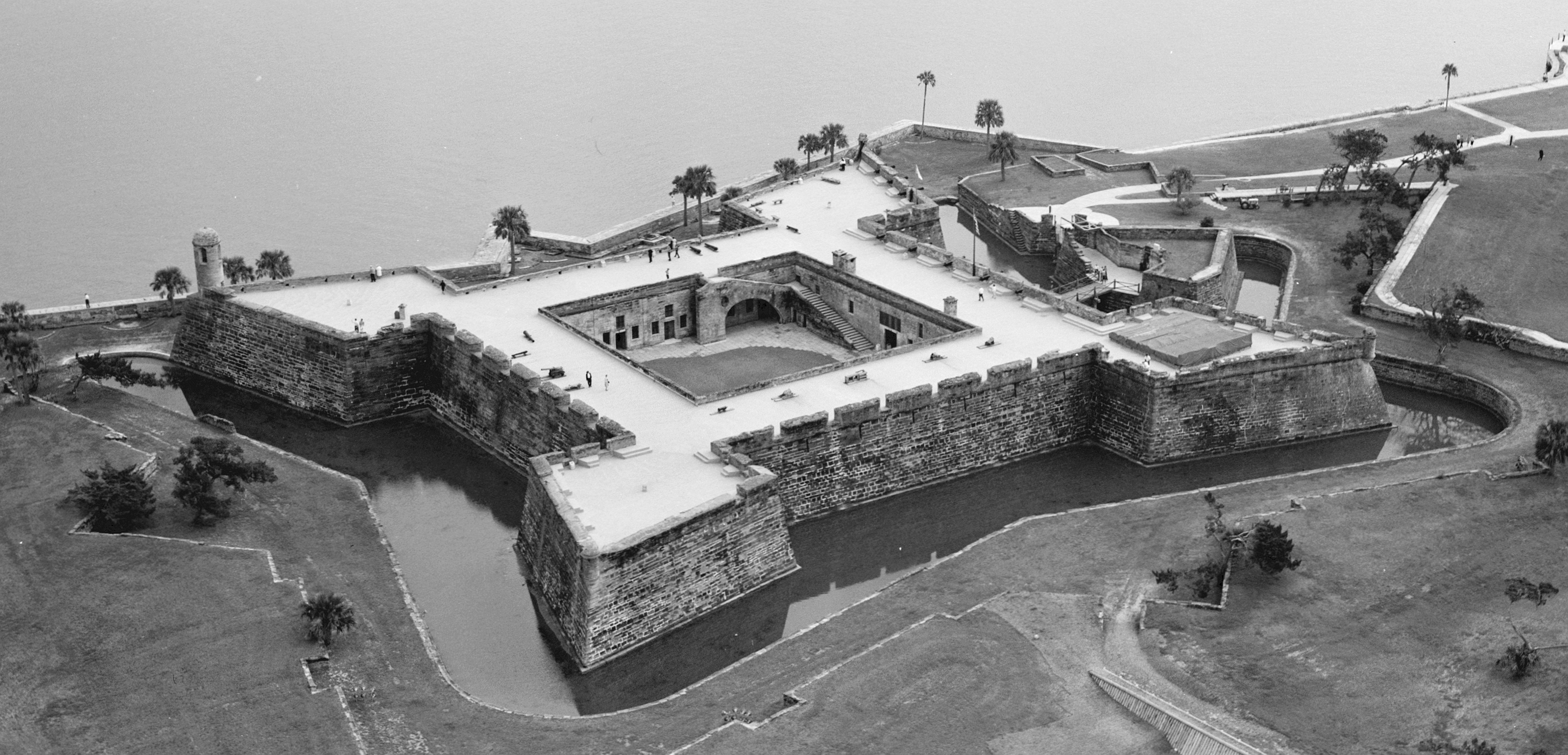
Aerial view photo taken from northwest. Although the fort had a water-filled moat at the time, it was originally a dry moat.

In 1924, Fort Marion was designated as a National Monument. In 1933 it was transferred to the National Park Service from the War Department.

In 1942, in honor of its Spanish heritage, Congress authorized renaming the fort as Castillo de San Marcos.

In 1964 the Castillo figured in the civil rights movement, when the "Freedom Tree" on the fort green became a gathering place for demonstrators who were not welcome across the street on what was state or private property in the age of segregation. The demonstrations in St. Augustine, led by Robert Hayling, Hosea Williams, and Martin Luther King played an important role in bringing about passage of the landmark Civil Rights Act of 1964, one of the two great legislative accomplishments of the movement.

As a historic property of the National Park Service, the National Monument was listed on the National Register of Historic Places (NRHP) on October 15, 1966. The National Park Service manages the Castillo together with Fort Matanzas National Monument. In 1975, the Castillo was designated an Historic Civil Engineering Landmark by the American Society of Civil Engineers.

Since being transferred to the Park Service, the Castillo has become a popular tourist attraction. It occupies 2.5 acres (1.0 ha) in downtown St. Augustine, Florida.

== In popular culture ==
The fort has been featured on many television shows including Monumental Mysteries and Ghost Adventures, as well as the 1951 film Distant Drums.

== Gallery ==
Castillo de San Marcos map

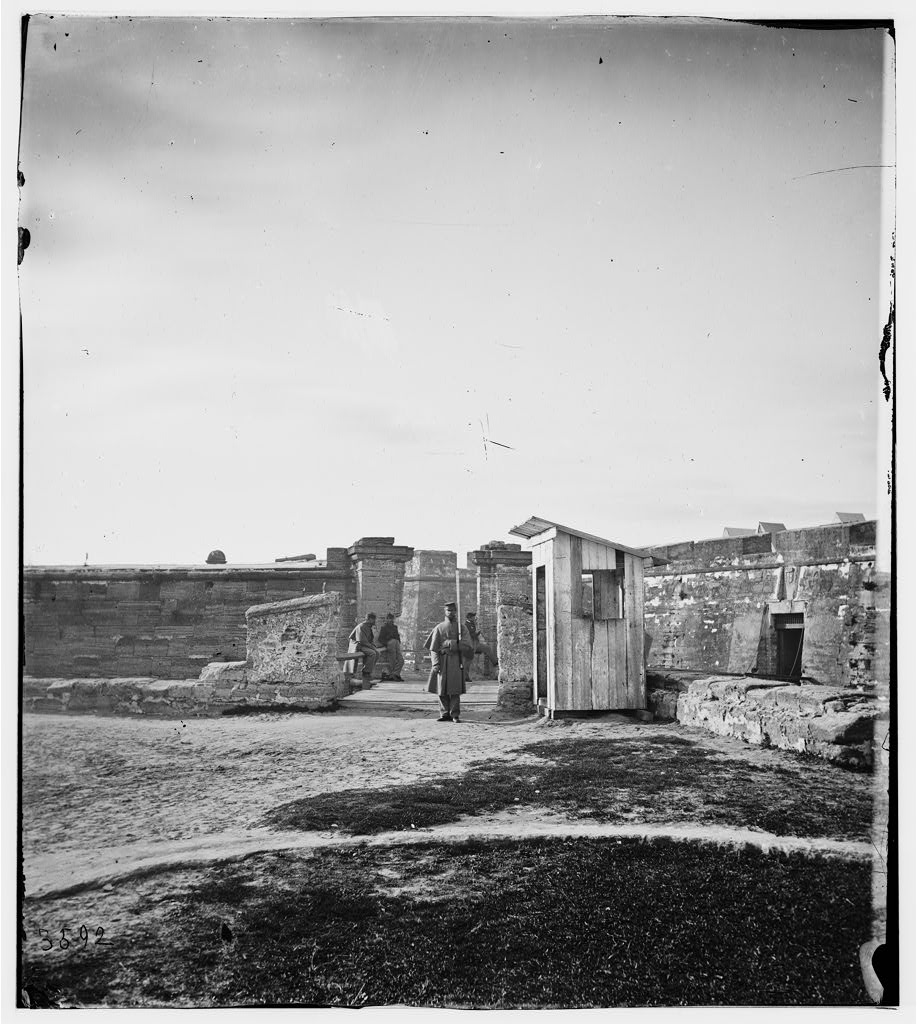
Entrance to fort, Civil War era

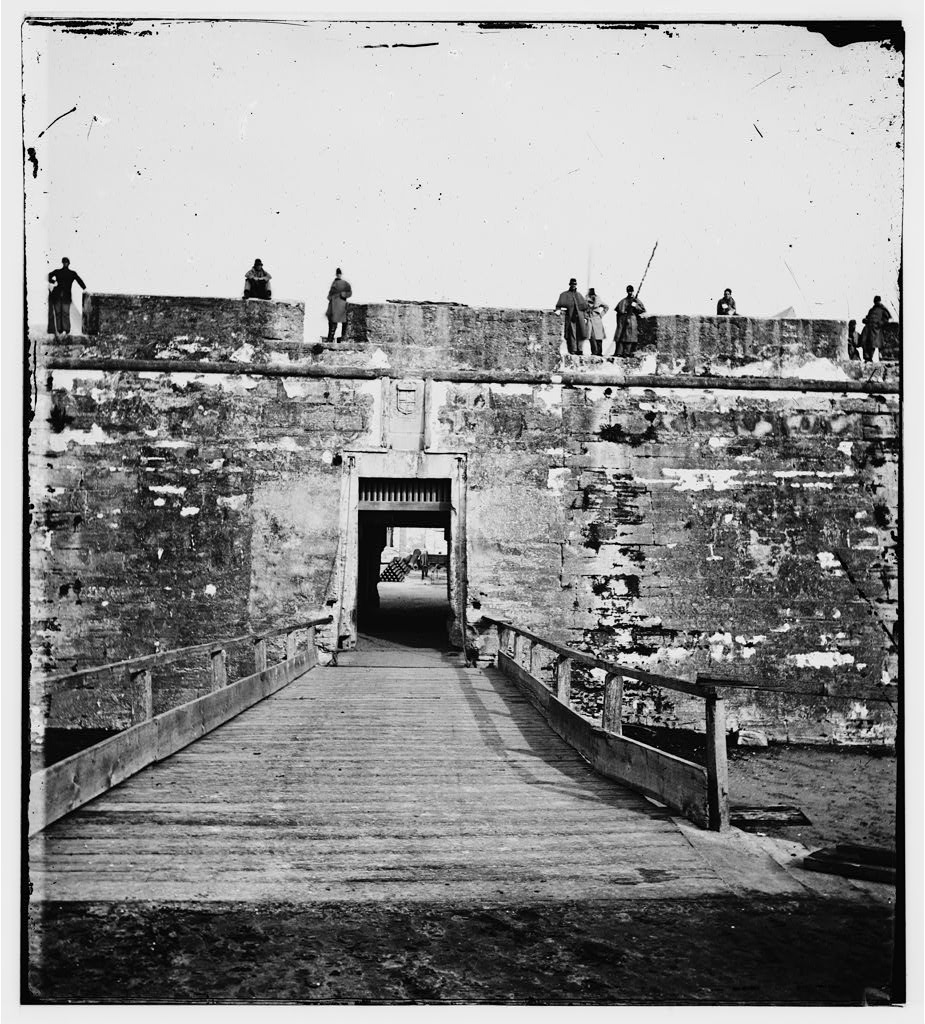
Entrance to fort, Sally port, Civil War era

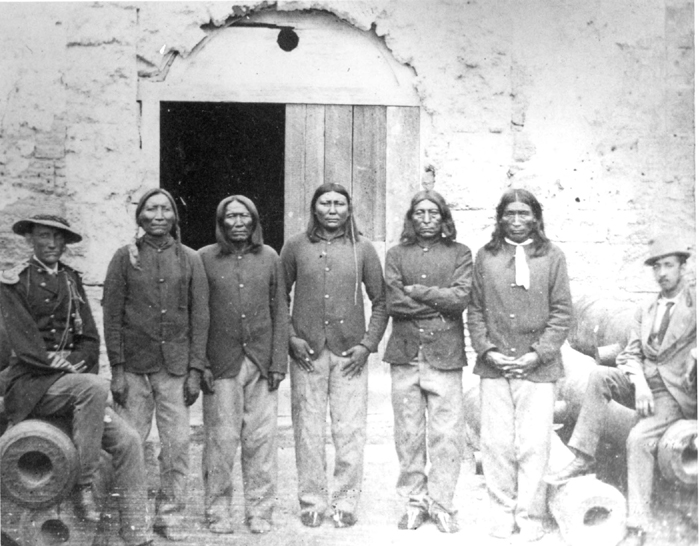
Captain Pratt with Native American captives at Fort Marion

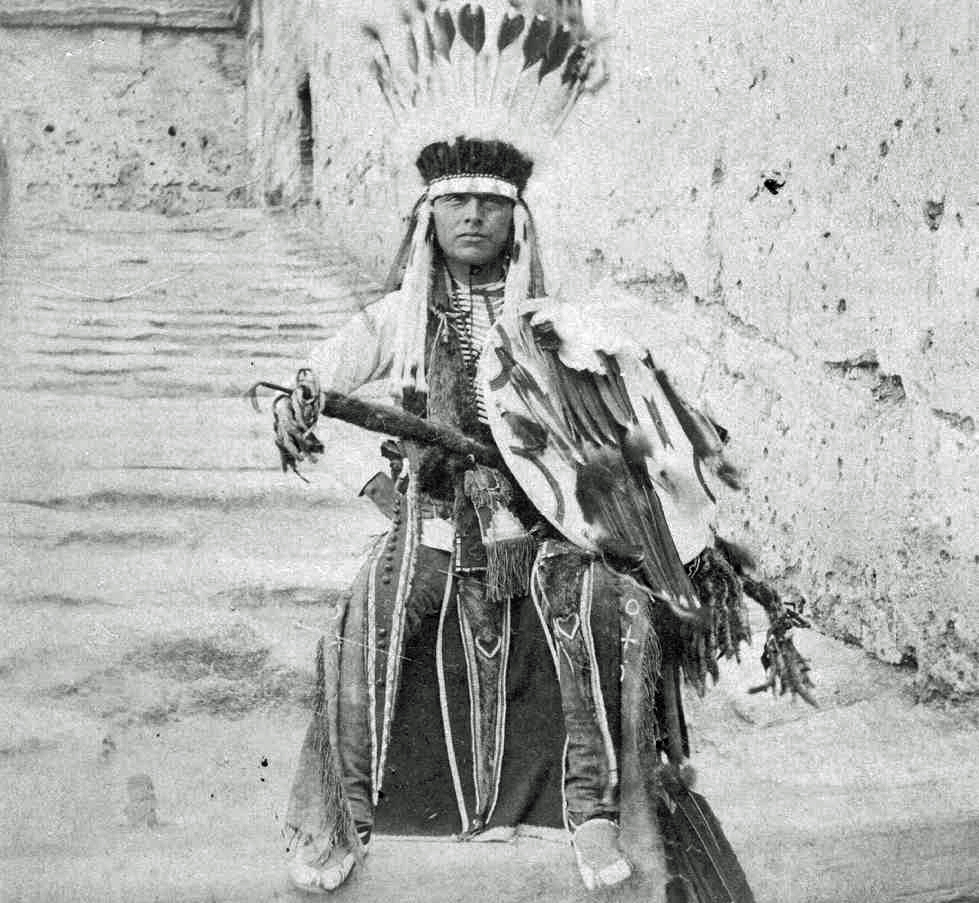
Howling Wolf, of the southern Cheyenne, photographed while imprisoned at Fort Marion

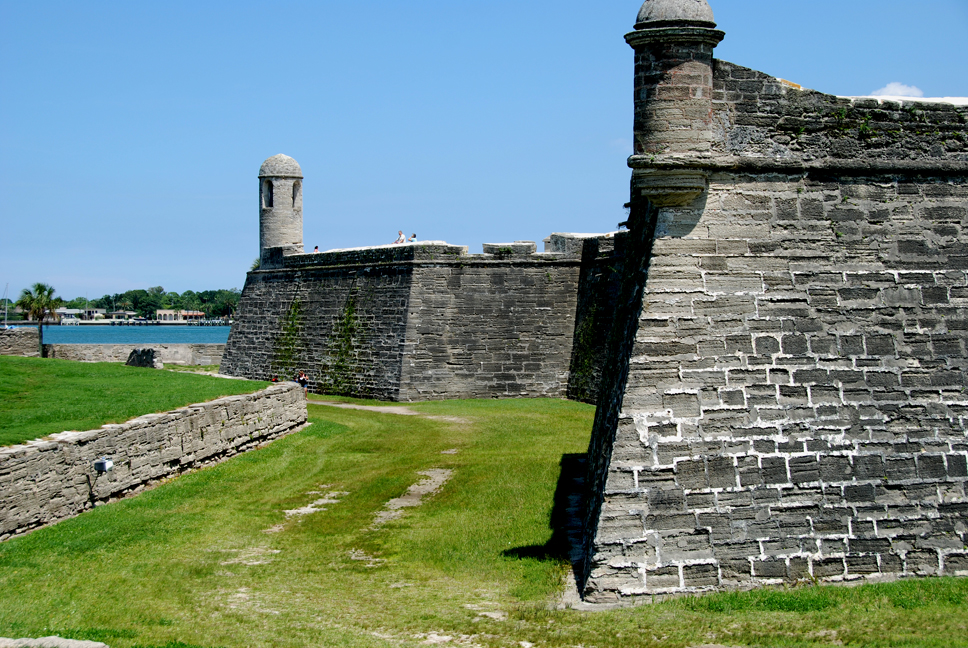
The north wall of the Castillo

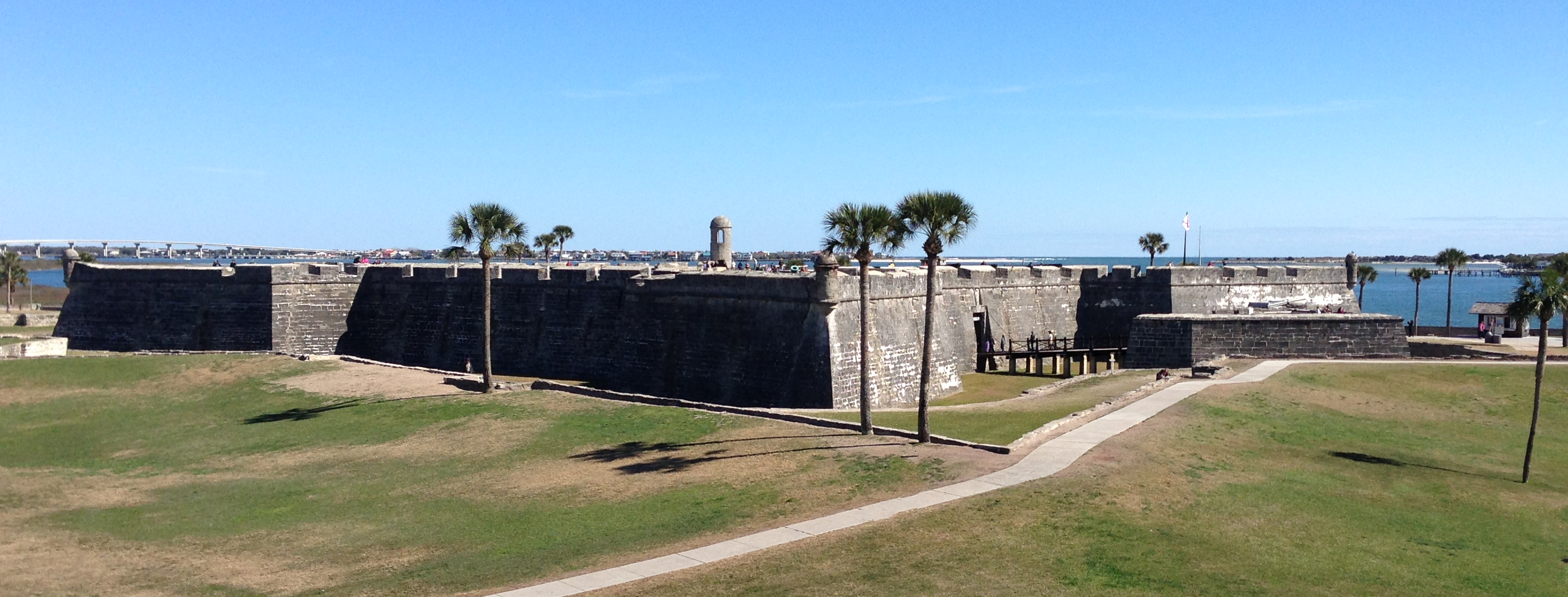
Castillo De San Marcos from the west, looking east.

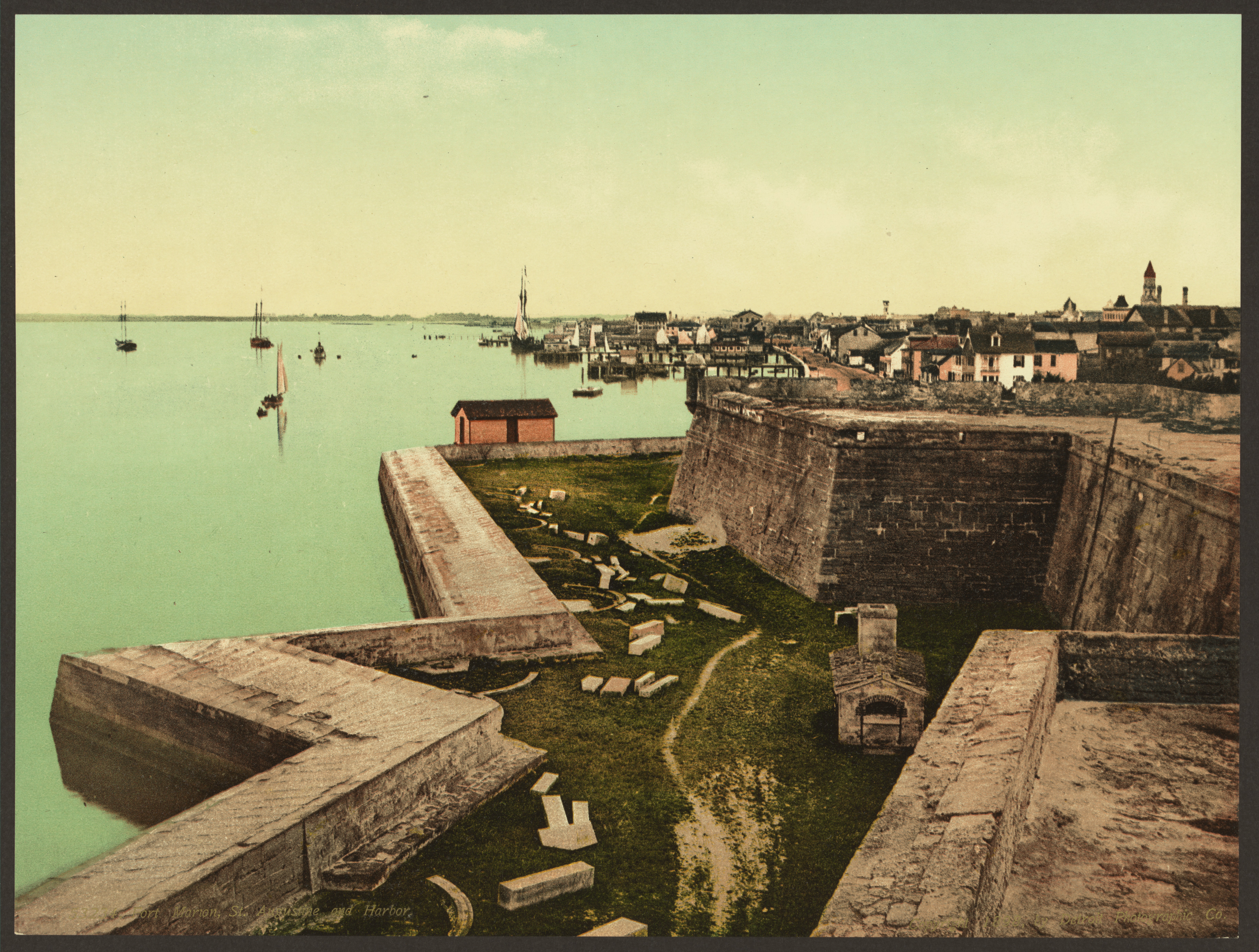
Fort Marion, St. Augustine and harbor, 1898

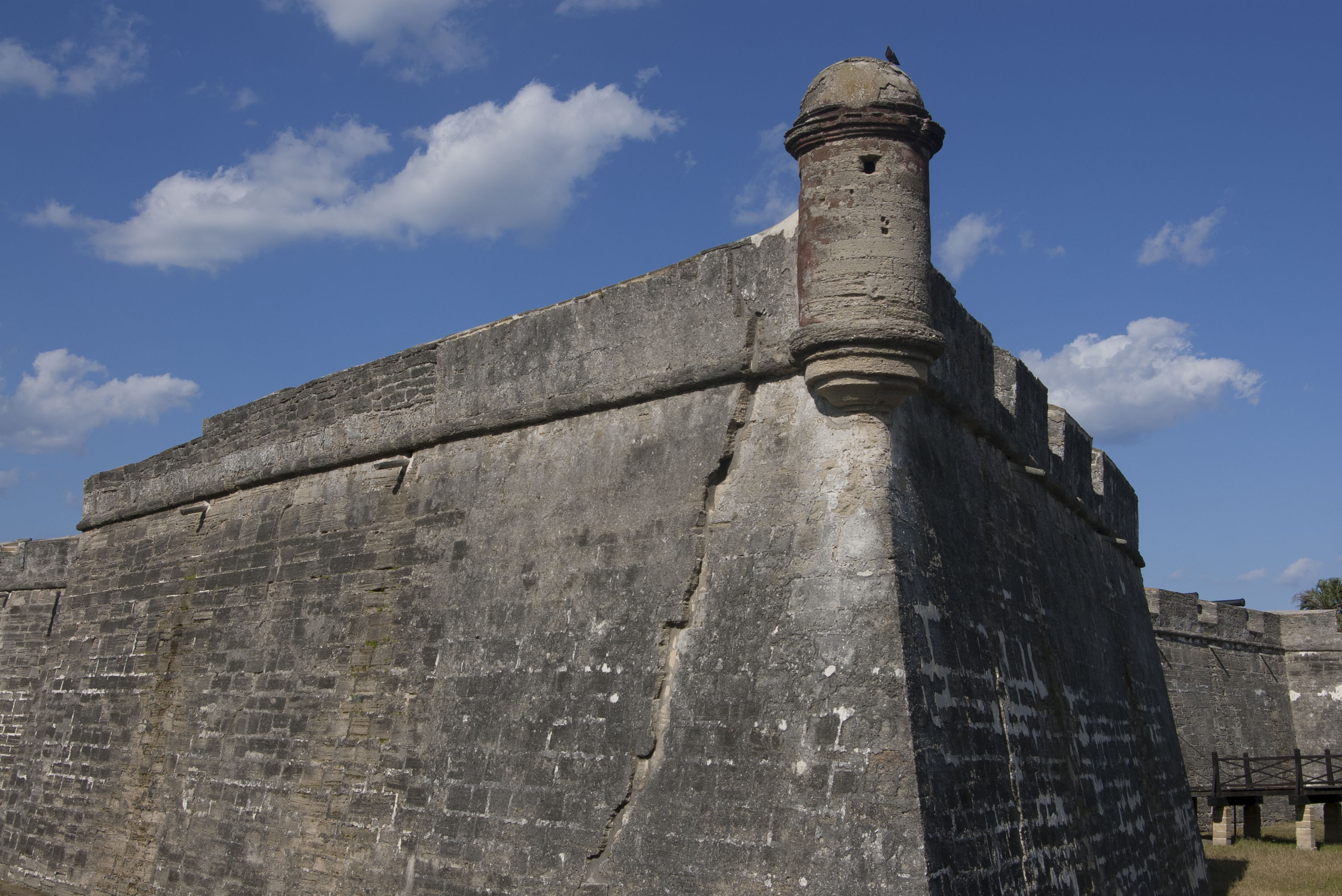
The side of Castillo de San Marcos in St. Augustine, FL.

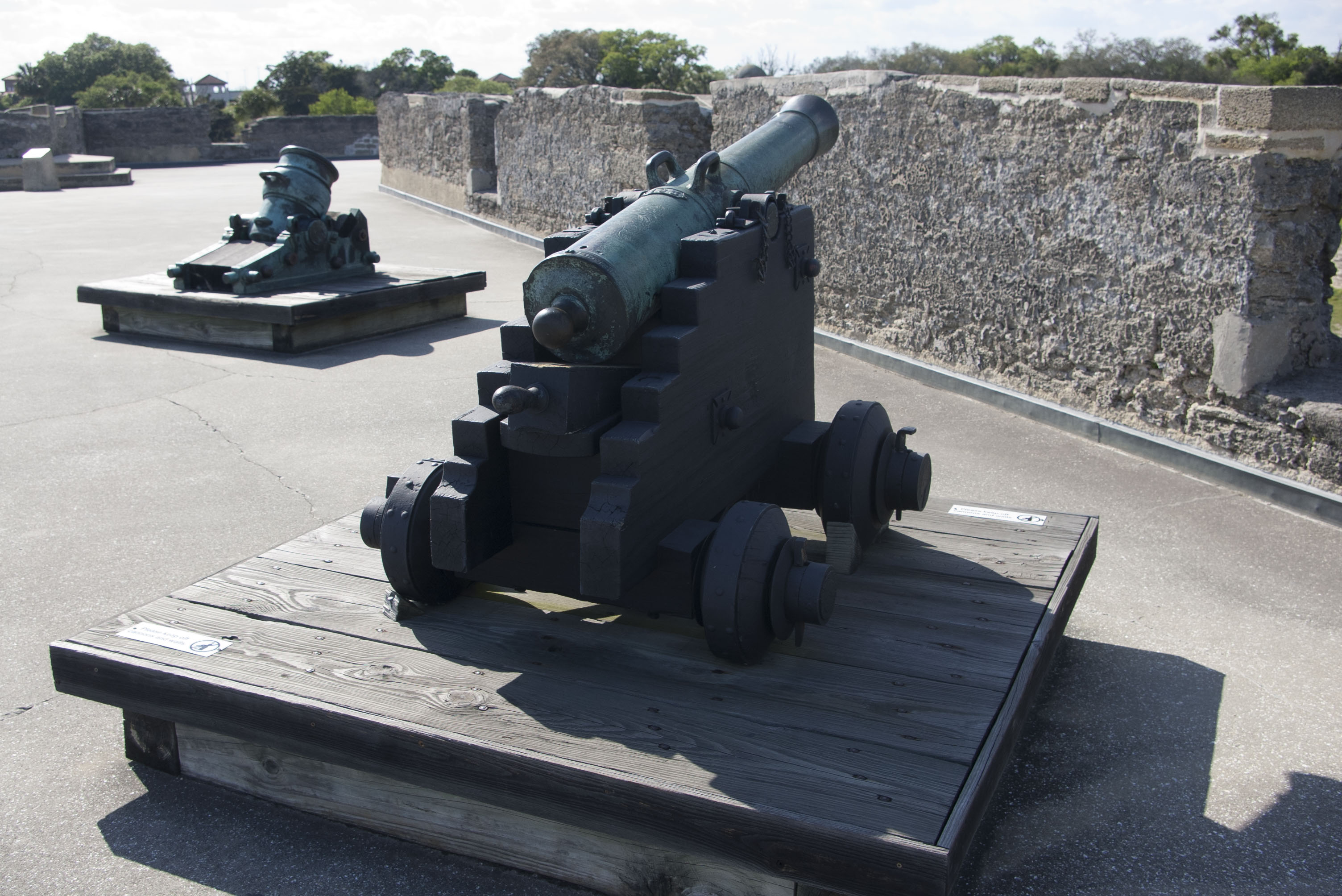
A picture of a cannon on Castillo de San Marcos

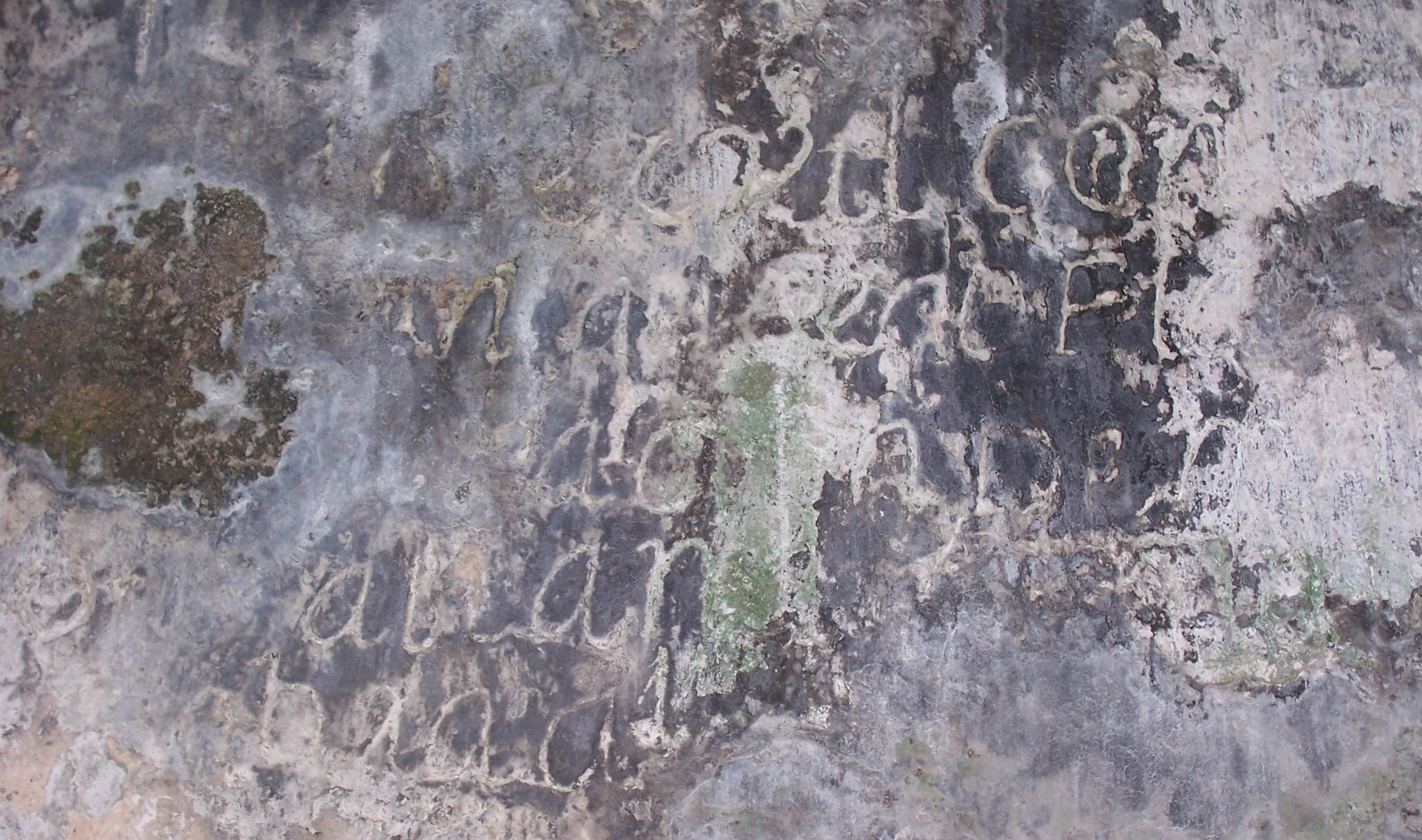
Interior Graffiti

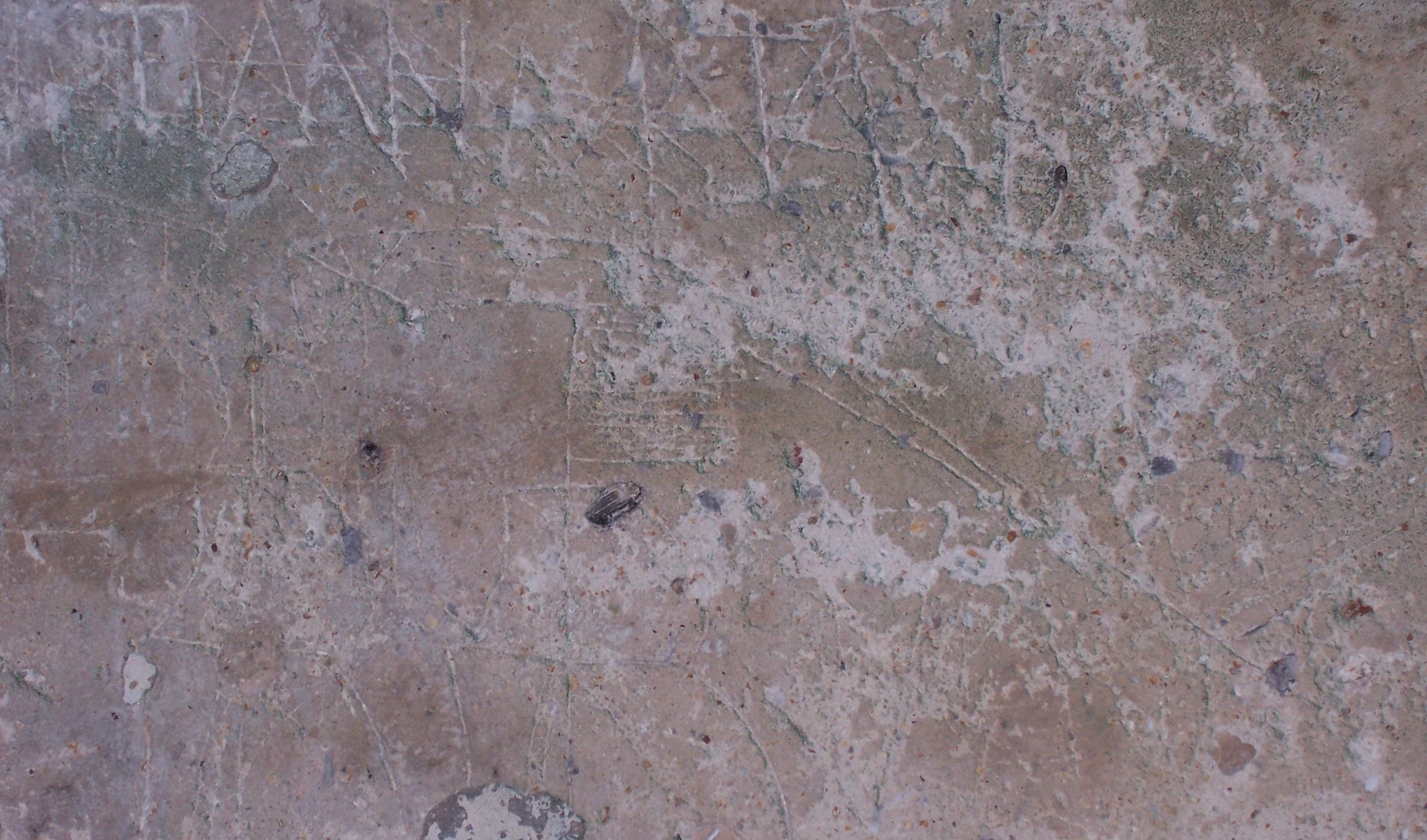
Interior Graffiti

== See also ==
- List of national monuments of the United States
