= Robert Searle =

English buccaneer on Jamaica

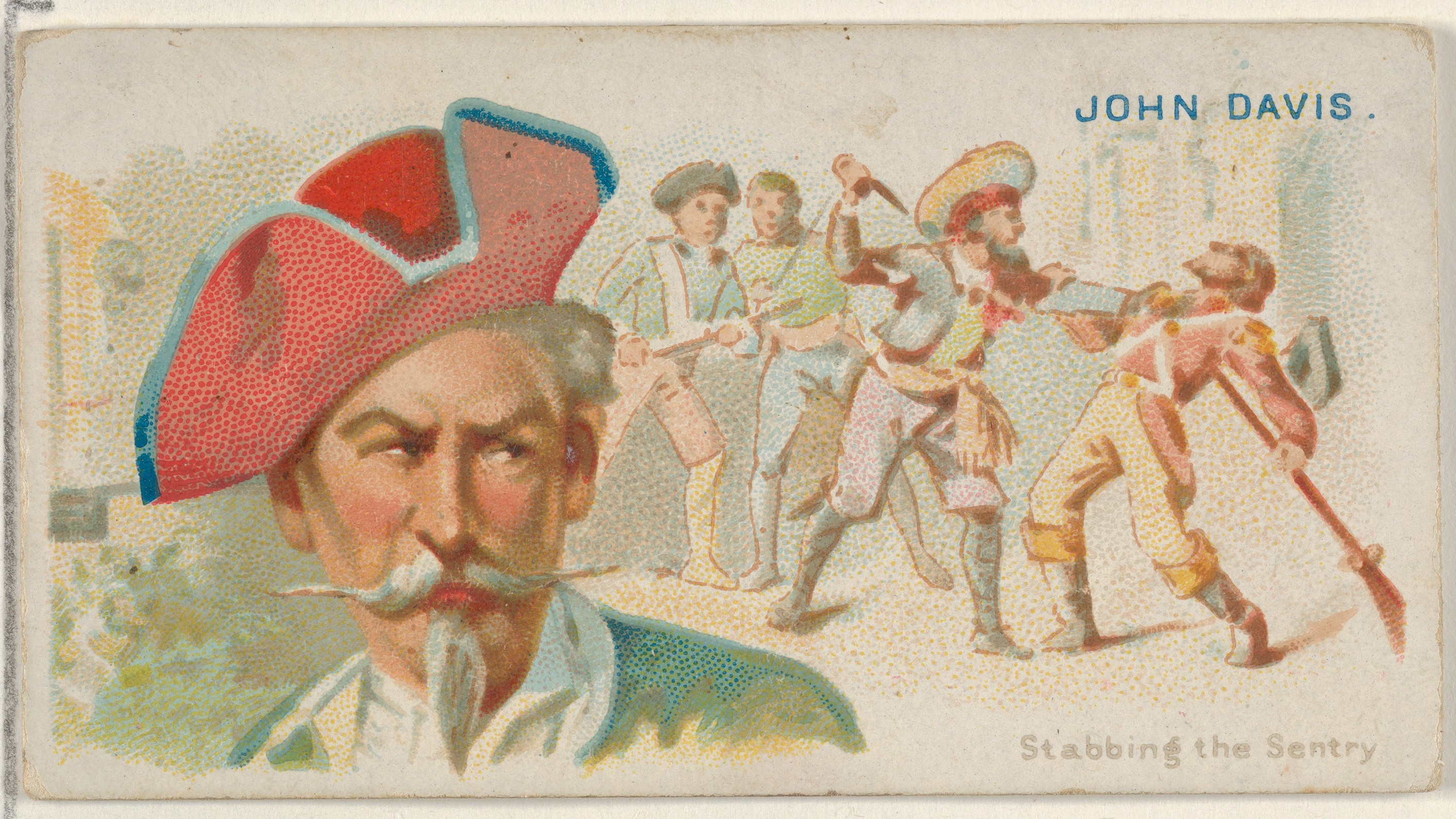
- Piratical career
- Nickname: John Davis
- Type: Buccaneer
- Allegiance: None
- Base of operations: Jamaica
- Commands: Cagway

Robert Searle (alias John Davis) was one of the earliest and most active of the English buccaneers on Jamaica.

== Early life ==
Nothing, to date, is known of his early life. The famous buccaneer chronicler, Esquemeling, states that Searle was “born at Jamaica,” but this seems unlikely, since that island did not become an English dominion until 1655. Searle's career as a “gentleman of fortune” was marred by frequent quarrels with Sir Thomas Modyford, royal governor of Jamaica, who usually befriended buccaneers.

== Piracy ==
=== The Cagway ===
Searle's first known ship was the 60-ton, 8-gun Cagway, the largest of four Spanish merchantmen captured by Sir Christopher Myngs as he returned from his raid on Santa Marta and Tolú (Colombia) in 1659. Four years later, Searle captained the Cagway as part of Myng's expedition against Santiago de Cuba. This force of 1,300 men and a dozen vessels sailed from Port Royal (Jamaica) on 1 October 1662 and two and a half weeks later disembarked to the east of their intended target. Santiago was overrun the following day and a considerable amount of booty carried back to Jamaica.

In 1664, the political situation in Europe and the Caribbean was volatile. Constant raiding by English buccaneers had prompted repeated and vociferous protests from Madrid, delivered by the Spanish ambassador to King Charles II of England. In turn, a letter to Governor Modyford from the king stated that “His Majesty cannot sufficiently express his dissatisfaction at the daily complaints of violence and depredation” against the Spanish by the ships of Jamaica. Modyford was “again strictly commanded not only to forbid the prosecution of such violence for the future, but to inflict condign punishment upon offenders, and to have the entire restitution and satisfaction made to the sufferers.”

That letter, signed in London 11 days after Modyford first landed at Port Royal, in early June, did not arrive until the beginning of September. It caused something of a sensation on the island. At that moment there were two rich Spanish prizes from Cuba at anchor in Port Royal's harbor. Both were heavily guarded and prizes to Searle, who had already landed the boxes and bags of Spanish coin so that the king's share could be calculated. Modyford promptly summoned the Council of Jamaica and showed them the letter.

The alarmed Council decided that the governor of Cuba should be told at once that the captured ships and money were being returned. It was resolved that “all persons making further attempts of violence upon the Spaniards be looked upon as pirates and rebels, and that Captain Searle’s commission be taken from him and his rudder and sails taken ashore for security.”

Searle's ship was restored, rudder and sails intact, with the outbreak of the Second Anglo-Dutch War in 1665. In early March 1666, he and his crew sailed as one of nine ships and 650 soldiers raised by Colonel Edward Morgan (Sir Henry Morgan’s uncle) in an expedition against the Dutch islands of Sint Eustatius and Sabá. This force was described in a letter by Modyford as “chiefly reformed privateers, scarce a planter amongst them, being resolute fellows and well armed with fusils [muskets ~ed.] and pistols.” The governor was particularly pleased that they would be serving “at the old rate of no purchase, no pay, and it will cost the King nothing considerable, some powder and mortar pieces.” Although they landed successfully, Morgan dropped dead from heat exhaustion.

The good old colonel, leaping out of the boat and being a corpulent man, got a strain, and his spirit being great, he pursued overearnestly the enemy on a hot day, so that he surfeited and suddenly died.

While these islands were quickly subdued, the English force disintegrated because of poor plunder and differences over who should succeed the late Col. Morgan as leader.

The next year, Searle and a Captain Stedman took two small ships and 80 men to the Dutch island of Tobago, near Trinidad, and sacked the island from end to end. Lord Willoughby, governor of the English colony of Barbados, had also fitted out an expedition to take Tobago, but the Jamaicans were three or four days before him. The latter were busy pillaging when Willoughby arrived and demanded the island in the king's name. The buccaneers condescended to leave the fort and governor's house standing only on the condition that Willoughby gave them liberty to sell their booty in Barbados.

Governor Modyford forbade further raids in June 1667 and recalled all privateering commissions issued in Jamaica. Again, he had to deal with Robert Searle, who was to be punished for his part in a straightforward piece of tit-for-tat. Soon after Sir Henry Morgan’s raid on Maracaibo (Venezuela), Searle and his ship were lying at New Providence in the Bahamas when a vengeful Spanish force attacked the English settlement there. This spurred several angry privateersmen, among them Searle, to sail for Florida and sack the presidio of St. Augustine, Florida in May 1668. Coming so soon after Modyford's proclamation withdrawing all commissions, and so obviously intended as retaliation, the governor decided that he would have to punish the leader, who by general consent was Searle. Henry Woodward, the first settler of South Carolina, had been captured by the Spanish and held at St. Augustine. Searle's 1668 raid resulted in Woodward's escape, who then served for several years as a surgeon on privateer ships.

When he returned to Jamaica, Searle guessed that he might be out of favour. Instead of sailing into Port Royal, he took the Cagway to a bay on the southwestern end of the island, out of the governor's reach. Governor Modyford reported to Lord Arlington, England’s Secretary of State:

There arrived also at Port Morant the Cagway, Captain Searle, with 70 stout men, who hearing that I was much incensed against him for that action of St. Augustine, went to Macary Bay, and there rides out of command. I will use the best ways to apprehend him, without driving his men to despair.

=== Arrest ===
Shortly thereafter, Searle ventured ashore and was seized by the governor, who placed him under arrest in Port Royal. Weeks passed without further orders from England and the governor wrote to Arlington again, stating that Searle was still in the custody of Jamaica's Provost Marshal, awaiting trial.

=== Panama ===
Ironically, he was freed after some months to take part in one of the buccaneer's greatest land battles, Sir Henry Morgan’s famous sack of Panama City (Panama). Searle was one of Morgan's lieutenants during this renowned action and was given the important task of preventing any Spanish ships from escaping the port. At the port, Searle and his crew discovered a barque lying fast aground, which the Spaniards had attempted to burn. The buccaneers succeeded in extinguishing the fire before much harm had been done. This vessel proved to be a valuable prize and, in a few days, Searle had captured three other ships. Commanding this tiny flotilla, he scoured the islands which stretched offshore – Perico, Taboga and Tobogilla, and Otoque, the most distant before reaching the Pearl Islands (Las Islas del Rey). He harried the ill-fated refugees concealed there, taking many prisoners and much property. The President of Panama, Don Juan Pérez de Guzmán wrote:

The English, having got possession of the Relicks of our town, found a Bark in the Fasca, although I had given order that there should be none, yet had they not complied with my command, and when they would have set it on Fire, the Enemy came fast and put it out and with it they did us great damage, for they took three more with it, and made great havock of all they found in the Islands of Taboga, Otoque, and Las Islas del Rey, taking and bringing from thence many Prisoners.

Searle was looking primarily for vessels which, laden with valuables, were known to be hiding in various anchorages along the Panama coast or among the islands. On the island of Taboga, while looking for fugitives, Searle and his crew discovered a hidden store of Peruvian wine. The seamen promptly started drinking and by evening, most were helplessly drunk.

They were far too drunk to post lookouts and therefore did not notice a Spanish galleon coming from seaward and anchor. Nor did they see a boat being lowered and rowed to shore full of casks. They first learned of all this when they accidentally surprised and captured the boat's seven-man crew as they looked for fresh water. The Spaniards were taken to Searle, who threatened them with torture. He discovered that the ship was none other than the 400-ton Santissima Trinidad very richly laden with all the King's Plate and a great quantity of riches of gold, pearls, jewels, and other most precious goods of all the best and richest merchants of Panama. On board this galleon were also the religious women belonging to the nunnery of the said city, who had embarked with them all the ornaments of the church, consisting of a great quantity of gold, plate, and other things of great value.

This single ship, which was reported to be armed with only seven cannon and 10–12 muskets, poorly supplied with food and water, and bearing only the uppermost sails of the main mast, carried the bulk of the gold, silver, and jewels which the government, private citizens, and the Church in Panama had shipped away for safety. Instead of fleeing to Lima (Peru), her captain, Don Francisco de Peralta, had simply put to sea. He apparently intended to return to Panama with his cargo and passengers after the buccaneers had left, since he believed they had no ships.

Searle immediately ordered to his men to seize the galleon, but they would not leave their wine or, more likely, were unable to obey. De Peralta, alarmed when his men failed to return and suspicious of the barque moored nearby, weighed anchor with some difficulty and fled into the night, being out of sight by daybreak. When the main body of buccaneers eventually learned of this missed opportunity a few days later, they were outraged. Esquemeling, even writing several years after the event, scornfully related how, when the watering party had been brought before Searle, the old rover “had been more inclined to sit drinking and sporting with a group of Spanish women he had taken prisoner, than to go at once in pursuit of the treasure ship.” Searle was bitterly reproached by Morgan and never regained his favour. Years later, Captain de Peralta was captured by the English privateer, William Dampier, in the Pacific and told the story of his narrow escape from Searle with much relish.

== Death ==
In later years, Robert Searle relocated to Honduras, where William Dampier wrote that he was killed in a duel with an Indigenous logwood cutter. Thus the Jamaican buccaneer met his death near a small sandy islet at the northern end of the Gulf of Campeache (in the Laguna de Términos), known to his brother pirates as “Serles's Key.”

At the North-end, and about the middle of the East Lagune, there is another small Creek like that which comes out against One-Bush-Key, but less and shallower, which dischargeth it self into Laguna Termina, against a small sandy Key, called by the English Serles's Key, from one Captain Serles, who first careen’d his vessel here, and was afterwards killed in the Western Lagune, by one of his company as they were cutting Logwood together.
