= Francisco Menéndez (Black soldier) =

Military leader serving the Spanish Crown in 18th-century St. Augustine, Florida

- Born: c.1704 Gambia
- Died: c.1770s Havana, Cuba?
- Citizenship: Spanish
- Occupations: Spanish militia captain, privateer

Francisco Menéndez (c. 1704 – after 1763) was a free Black militiaman and privateer who served the Spanish Empire and helped escaped slaves gain their freedom in Spanish Florida. He was a leader of Fort Mose, the first free Black settlement in North America.

Born to the Mandinka people of the Gambia, West Africa, Menéndez was captured and sold into slavery, being purchased by European slave traders and transported across the Atlantic to the British colony of Carolina. He escaped into Spanish Florida soon after, taking advantage of the Spanish policy which granted freedom to fugitive slaves from British North America. Menéndez enlisted in the Spanish colonial militia, and successfully petitioned for the freedom of himself and 31 others. He moved into Gracia Real de Santa Teresa de Mose (Fort Mose), which had been established as a settlement and military outpost for free people of color by the Spanish governor Manuel de Montiano. After participating in numerous conflicts, Menéndez was recognized by the Spanish Crown for his loyalty and courage. He eventually retired in Havana, after founding the village of San Agustín de la Nueva Florida (Ceiba Mocha) in Cuba.

Fort Mose has since been designated as a National Historic Landmark and a World Heritage Site, as it was the first officially recognized community of free Blacks in what is now the United States.

== African birth ==
Menéndez's original name is unknown. He was likely born along the Gambia River in Africa. He was of Mandinka descent. Sometime between 1709 and 1711, he was captured, sold by slave traders, and probably shipped to the British colony of Carolina during a period of significantly increased importation of enslaved Africans.

== In Florida ==
Runaway slaves from England's North American colonies began fleeing to Spanish Florida in the late 17th century. The first documented runaways from Carolina made it to St. Augustine in 1687. Soon after, Spain began to allow slaves who escaped from English colonies to remain in Florida. While they were required to be baptized Catholics and to work for the colony, they were paid for their labor. In 1693, Spanish King Carlos II made the policy official.

During the Yamasee War of 1715–1717, in which a confederation of Native Americans led by the Yamasee fought against British colonists in South Carolina, Menéndez escaped from bondage and fought alongside the confederation. After reinforcements arrived from nearby British colonies, the Yamasee-led confederation were ultimately defeated and Menéndez fled to Spanish Florida with several others, including his wife, Ana María de Escobar. He was subsequently sold to Governor Juan de Ayala y Escobar and then to Francisco Menéndez Márquez, the royal accountant of St. Augustine, Florida, in 1718. Though he remained a slave, he was baptized into the Catholic Church, taking the name of his owner, who also became his godfather. In 1726, Menéndez joined St. Augustine's Black militia. In 1727, Menéndez aided in the defense of St. Augustine, establishing his reputation for leadership. A year later he received a commendation from the governor.

According to historian Jane Landers, Menéndez became the epitome of what historian Ira Berlin called the Atlantic Creoles: people shipped from the slave ports in Africa who acquired "linguistic dexterity, cultural plasticity, and social agility". He became fluent in Spanish and probably also knew Arabic. Menéndez repeatedly petitioned both the Spanish governor and the auxiliary bishop of Cuba for his manumission. When Manuel de Montiano became governor in 1737, Menéndez once again formally requested freedom for himself and 31 others whom he claimed were unjustly enslaved, with support from a Yamasee chief. On March 15, 1738, Montiano granted unconditional freedom to all fugitives who arrived from British colonies, including Menéndez. This created an official avenue for fugitive slaves to seek their manumission, benefitting not only those who had already reached Florida but also any future arrivals from British colonies.

After 1738, Menéndez was appointed civil and military leader of the newly built Fort Mose, established for the community of freed Blacks. On December 28, 1739, Menéndez and Ana María de Escovar have a Catholic wedding ceremony to formalize their marriage. From this base, Menéndez led several raids against plantations in the Carolinas, and inspired further unrest amongst slaves in the colony of South Carolina. In 1740, a British expeditionary force invaded Florida and captured Fort Mose during the War of Jenkins' Ear. Days later, Spanish and Fort Mose militiamen counter-attacked and recaptured the fort, forcing the British to retreat from the region. Fort Mose was destroyed during the second battle but the governor again commended Menéndez and his troops, including in letters to the king. Menéndez also wrote to the king, requesting compensation for his services on at least two separate occasions, but he was unsuccessful.

After the destruction of Fort Mose, Menéndez and the Black militia returned to St. Augustine, where Menéndez enlisted as a privateer to earn an income. In 1741, Menéndez was captured by the Boston privateer Revenge. When he was recognized as the captain of Fort Mose, he was tied to a cannon, given 200 lashes, and threatened with castration. Revenge's captain, Benjamin Norton, proceeded to sell Menéndez into slavery in the Bahamas, where he was purchased to a Mr. Stone. Whether he escaped or was ransomed by the Spanish is not known, but by 1759 he was once more back in Florida as the leader of the free Black community at the rebuilt Fort Mose.

In 1759, Fort Mose had a population of 67. Those free Blacks who had moved to St. Augustine after its destruction were forcibly moved back to the fort in 1752 by the new governor. The free Blacks of Fort Mose were considered among the fiercest enemies of the British and claimed they would shed every drop of their blood in defense of Spain and Catholicism. Many of them completed thirty years of active service. For their valor and dedication, they received distinctions and privileges. By 1763, there were approximately 3,000 Blacks at Fort Mose, with three quarters having once been slaves.

== Evacuation to Cuba ==
Menéndez continued to live at Fort Mose with his wife and four children, until Spanish Florida was ceded to the British in 1763 after the defeat of France in the Seven Years' War. In the Treaty of Paris, the British exchanged territory with Spain, taking over Florida in exchange for the return of Havana and Manila. Along with most Spanish colonists from St. Augustine and the Fort Mose community, Menéndez was evacuated by the Spanish crown to Cuba and was granted a portion of land, provisions, tools, and his own slave. Along with the other free Blacks, Menéndez established San Agustín de la Nueva Florida (St. Augustine of the New Florida), near Matanzas. In his later years, poverty forced him to sell his land and retire to Havana, where he received a government pension.

== Legacy and honors ==
The site of Fort Mose, where Menéndez led the militia, was designated as a National Historic Landmark by the United States in 1995. The original site was rediscovered in an archeological dig in the 1980s and has been protected as Fort Mose Historic State Park, owned and run by the Florida Park Service. It is widely known as the first legally-sanctioned community of freedmen and a destination for African-American refugees from slavery. It served as a precursor to the Underground Railroad that developed during the Antebellum years. Francisco Menéndez's life story frequently features in reenactments at Fort Mose.

== Children's book ==
The story of Fort Mose and Francisco Menéndez is told in a children's book published in 2010.

== See also ==
- Fort Mose
- Siege of Fort Mose
- Slavery in the colonial United States
- Spanish Florida

== Sources ==
- Berlin, Ira. Many Thousands Gone: The First Two Centuries of Slavery in North America. Cambridge, Massachusetts: The Belknap Press of Harvard University Press, 1998. p. 74-75.
- Deagan, Kathleen; MacMahon, Darcie (1995). Fort Mose: Colonial America's Black Fortress of Freedom. Gainesville, Florida: University Press of Florida. ISBN 0813013518.
- Landers, Jane, Black Society in Spanish Florida. Urbana: University of Illinois Press, 1999.
