= Fort San Francisco de Pupo =

18th-century Spanish fort in Florida, United States

- Northwest of St. Augustine, Florida, on west bank of the St. Johns River in United States
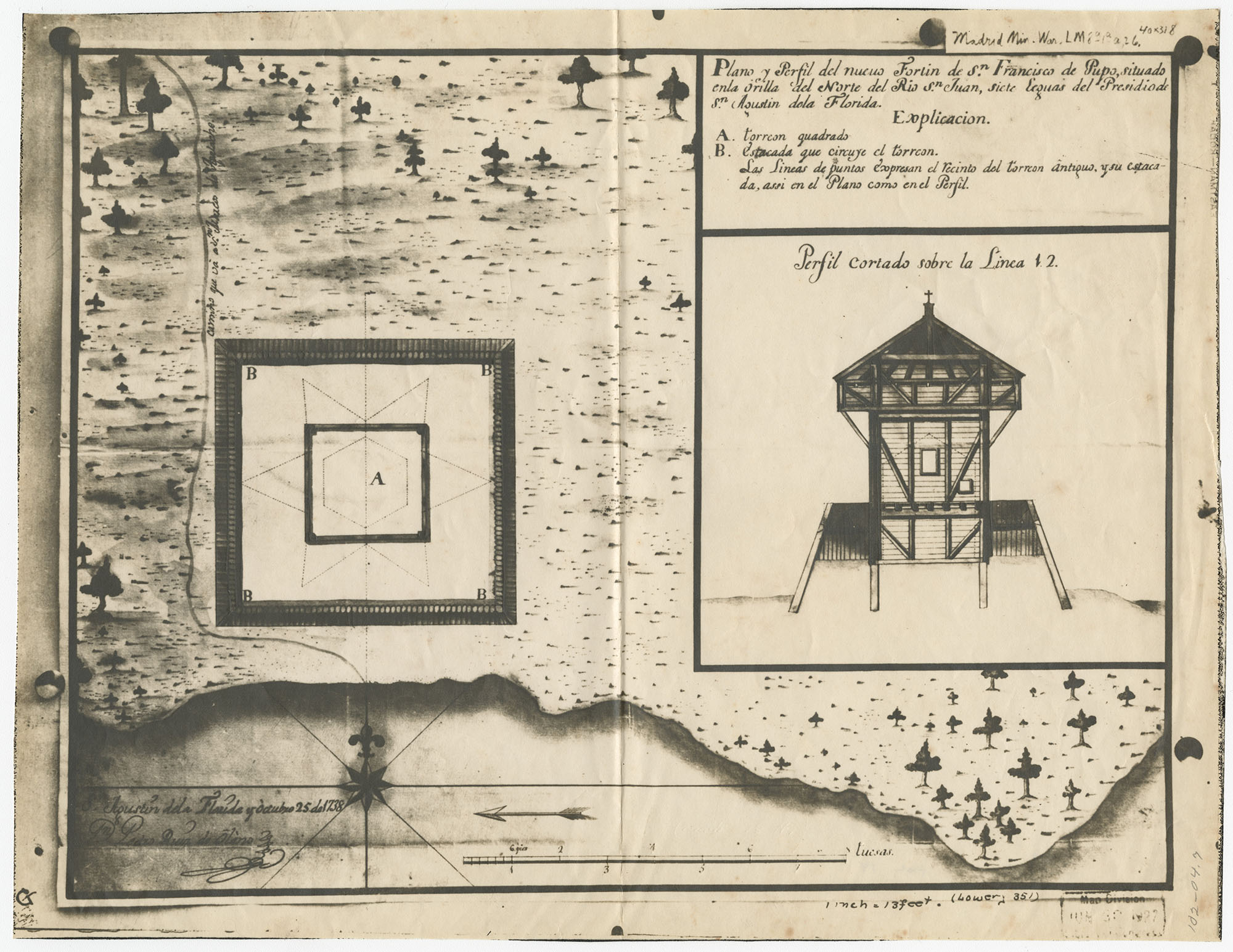
- Plan and Profile of Fort San Francisco de Pupo

Site information
- Condition: Only traces remain
- Website: Waymarking.com

Location
- Location of Fort San Francisco de Pupo Fort San Francisco de Pupo (the United States)
- Coordinates: 29°56′19″N 81°36′14″W
- Height: 32 ft.

Site history
- Built: 1734
- Built by: Spanish Army (Ejército de Tierra)
- In use: 1740
- Materials: Pine log palisade and blockhouse
- Events: Seized by James Oglethorpe's troops

Garrison information
- Past commanders: British Captains MacKay and Desbrissy
- Garrison: Regular army troops

Fort San Francisco de Pupo (Spanish: Fuerte San Francisco de Pupo) was an 18th-century Spanish fort on the west bank of the St. Johns River in Florida, about eighteen miles from St. Augustine (San Agustín), the capital of Spanish Florida (La Florida). Lying on the old trail to the Spanish province of Apalachee in western Florida, Fort Pupo and its sister outpost, Fort Picolata on the opposite shore of the river, controlled all traffic on the ferry crossing. The remains of Fort Pupo are situated about three miles south of Green Cove Springs in Clay County, near the end of Bayard Point opposite Picolata. The surrounding area is a hammock of southern live oak, southern magnolia, pignut hickory and other typical trees native to the region.

The site of Fort Pupo was excavated in stratigraphic tests by cultural anthropologist John Goggin and students of the University of Florida in 1950 and 1951; his team's excavations indicated that the original structure of Fort Pupo was little more than a sentry box. A letter written by Royal Engineer Antonio de Arredondo on January 22, 1737 describes it as "a sentry box built of boards, eight feet in diameter… surrounded by a palisade." This diminutive fortification was replaced in 1738 by the construction of a new wooden blockhouse, barracks, and storehouses on the orders of the governor of La Florida, Manuel de Montiano. The work was done under the direction of Engineer Pedro Ruiz de Olano, who pulled a crew of carpenters, sawyers, and axemen from construction of the Castillo de San Marcos, the fortress of St. Augustine, to rebuild the Pupo blockhouse. The architectural plan and profile of the structure are shown in his "Plano y perfil del nuevo fortín de San Francisco de Pupo" (Plan and Profile of Fort San Francisco de Pupo).

== History ==
Tensions had been growing between the Spanish and the British after James Moore, the governor of Carolina, invaded La Florida in 1704 and 1706. Fort Pupo, along with Fort Picolata on the opposite side of the St. Johns, was built in 1734 by order of Governor Francisco del Moral y Sánchez in anticipation of more attacks by the English and their Indian allies;

A party of Yuchi Indians, allies of the British and the Upper Creeks, attacked Fort Pupo in 1738, damaging the stockade and killing two soldiers. After this event the Spanish enlarged the fort to a 30-by-16 blockhouse, surrounded by a timber and earth rampart. A small garrison of ten soldiers and a sergeant, along with seven cannon, was stationed there. At the same time, James Oglethorpe, the governor of the British colony of Georgia, began building up a joint force of militia, regular troops, and Indians at Fort Frederica in preparation for a planned invasion of Florida.

With the outbreak of the War of Jenkins' Ear, Oglethorpe determined, in response to an attack the Spanish had made on the British outpost at Amelia Island (in which they decapitated two British soldiers), to raid the Spanish outposts that were part of the defense network of St. Augustine. Now in command of a fleet of 15 boats and 180 men, his raiding party consisted of a combined force of Highland Rangers and soldiers of the 42nd Regiment of Foot, regular soldiers from Fort Frederica, and Creek, Chickasaw, and Yuchi Indians. Oglethorpe made his first move and invaded Spanish territory in late December 1739, his objective being to harass the Spaniards, burn their plantations, and intimidate their Indian allies. On January 6 (O.S.), 1740, the raiders set out from the fort he had previously built at the mouth of the St. Johns, Fort Saint George, where they were joined by an armed English privateer's sloop.

Oglethorpe led his force and the sloop up the St. Johns River to attack Forts Picolata and Pupo. They landed five miles downstream on the east bank and made a nighttime advance on Fort Picolata, arriving at 2:00 a.m. on the 7th. A detachment of Darien Highlanders, infantrymen from Fort Frederica, and Indians led the attack, and by daybreak the fort was taken and burnt. The Spanish garrison at Fort Pupo spotted Oglethorpe's Indian auxiliaries from the other side of the river, and, thinking they were Yamasee allies, sent a ferry across, which hastily reversed course and returned when it perceived its mistake.

Oglethorpe then landed his regulars a mile north of Pupo and marched on it with four field guns. An advance party of Indians and Rangers attacked the fort, while the regulars under Ens. Sanford Mace opened their artillery fire. The combined assault forced the defenders to surrender after the second volley, just before sunset; the Highlanders and Indian scouts then seized the fort and the took the men of the garrison prisoner. Oglethorpe stationed the 50 Highlanders under the command of Capt. Hugh MacKay, Jr., and leaving them the sloop, he returned to Fort Frederica. Oglethorpe had successfully struck against the forts Pupo, Picolata, and San Diego during these preliminary raids, made in anticipation of his plan to capture and destroy St. Augustine by a land and sea attack. These raids, however, would prove to be the only successes in his futile campaign to take the city in 1740.
