= Clay pipe dating =

Archaeological dating method

Clay pipe dating is the act of dating clay tobacco pipes found at archaeological sites to specific time periods.

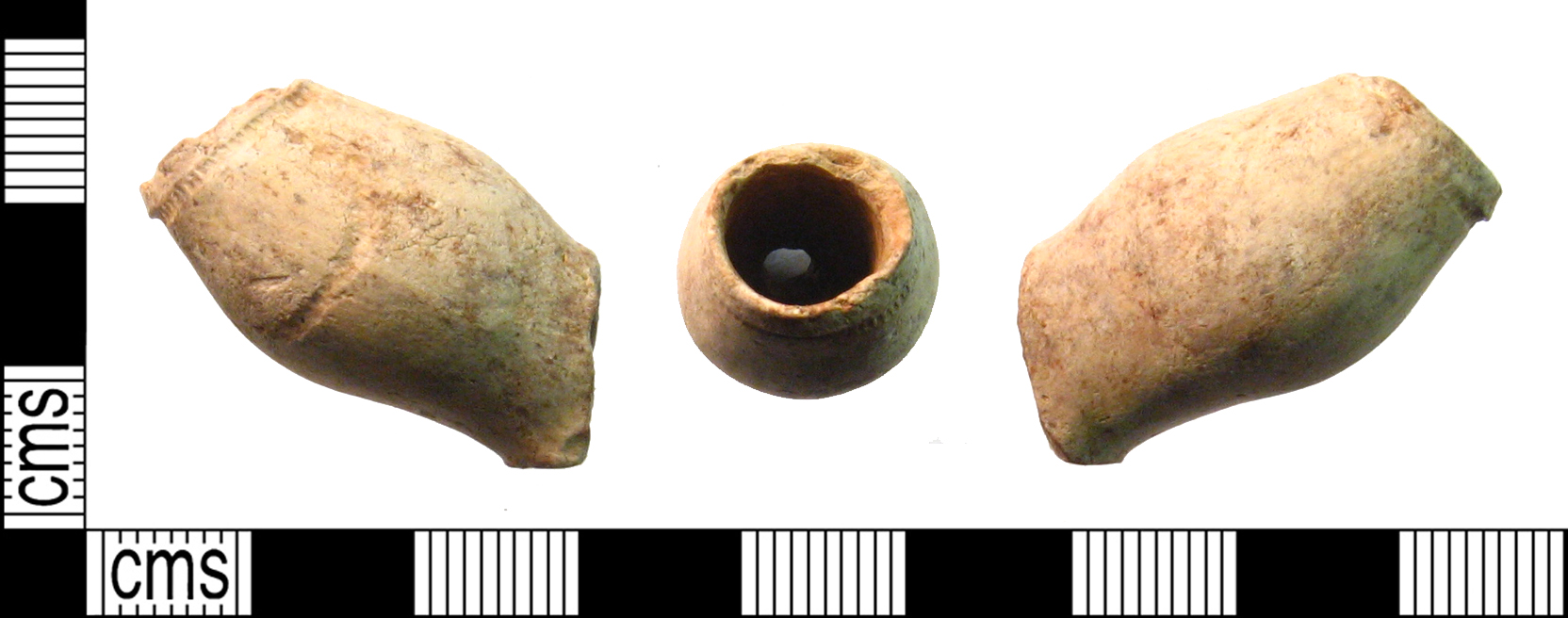
Pipe bowl found in Kent, southeast England. The circular hole through the tube is slightly off-centre and measures 3.36mm in diameter, and would suggest a rough date of c.1610 AD.

Clay pipes are a useful archaeological dating tool because, during the historical period when they were in use, they were a common and breakable item and therefore they are frequently found at archeological sites. In addition, variations in their features make them highly dateable objects.

Originally clay pipes were dated by their morphology, through examination of the pipe's bowl and the maker's mark. The first comprehensive studies were detailed by Adrian Oswald in 1951. In 1954, archaeologist J. C. Harrington developed a method of dating pipe stems to specific time periods. This method was later developed upon by Lewis Binford, Lee Hanson Jr. and Robert Heighton and Kathleen A. Deagan.

== Origins of clay pipe dating ==
Originally, clay pipes were dated through the examination of the bowl of the pipe rather than the stem. In 1951, Adrian Oswald published a study of English clay tobacco types, upon which all successive studies were based upon. Oswald showed how, over time, the bowls of pipes increased, as did the angle at which the bowl was attached to the stem of the pipe. In a later study, Oswald created a variety of comprehensive drawings on bowl shapes of English pipes throughout the 17th and 18th centuries, using the dates of the archaeological sites the bowls were found at in order to date them.

Bowls were also dated using the maker's marks which provide a relatively accurate date. Oswald created a detailed list of pipe makers, their marks and the dates in which they were creating pipes across the United Kingdom. The location of maker's marks can also help contribute to dating efforts. The typical placement of marks changed over the 17th century from the bottom of the bowl to the spur and the heel. In the 18th century, marks were additionally placed on the back of the bowl. These changes all allowed for dating of pipes prior to the invention of dating formulas, and can still be used instead of the formulaic methods popularised today.

== Harrington's time periods ==
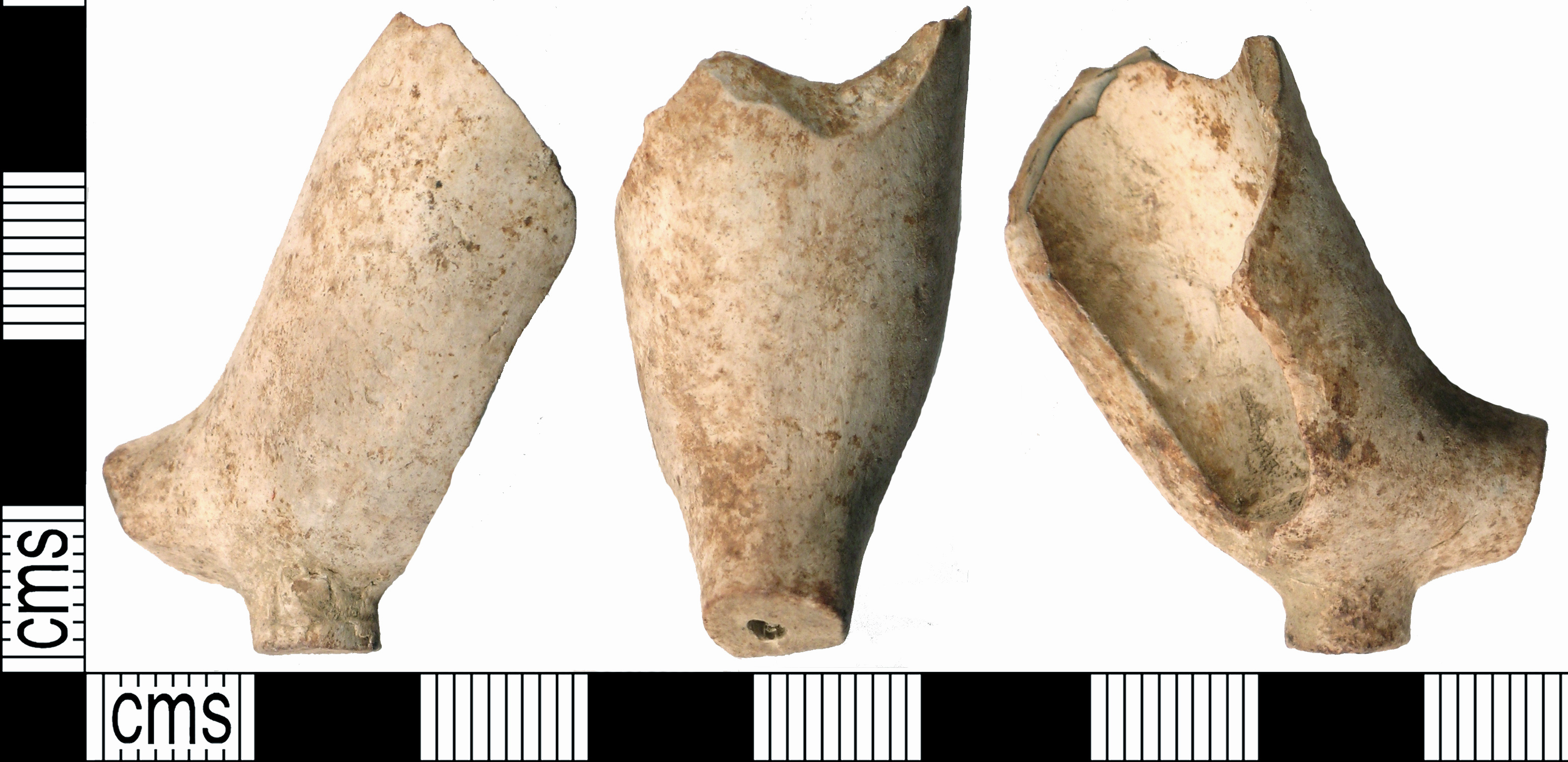
Three clay pipe bowls from Kent, dating to the mid 18th century, with maker's marks on the foot. The use of a maker's mark, shape of the bowl, size of foot and angle of connection with the stem suggest a c.1740-1760 AD date.

Clay pipe stems were first used as a dating tool beginning in 1954, when archaeologist J.C Harrington realised that the imported English white clay tobacco pipe stem fragments found in archaeological sites across Virginia changed over time, following a general trend wherein the bore diameter of the stem over the course of the 17th to the 18th century.

This led Harrington to identify five time periods between the years 1620-1800 to which pipes could be dated based upon the decrease in the bore diameter of the clay pipe stem. Harrington only used English pipe stems and noted that the accuracy of this dating method was only accurate for pipes created before 1800. He also stated that ten or more fragments within a sample size would be needed to use this method. Despite these stipulations, three formulaic methods of dating were developed based on Harrington's time periods: Binford's linear formula, Hanson's formulas and the Heighton and Deagan Formula.

== Binford's linear formula ==
Binford's linear formula was developed by Lewis Binford in 1962. It enables the calculation of the date of a clay pipe sample from the diameter of its stem.

This equation is only effective on samples up to the year of 1780 when white clay pipes began being manufactured in America, and imitated earlier styles. Other requirements for its effectiveness are that the samples must be random, representative of the site and that the sites the samples are from must have a constant rate of deposition.

This method is the most commonly used for clay pipe dating.

== Hanson's regression formulas ==
In 1968, archaeologist Lee Hanson Jr. created a series of regression formulas based on the averages of each of Harrington's time periods and Binford's dates. This allowed entire archeological sites to be dated based on clay pipe stem fragments found at the site.

Each of Hanson's formulas has a time range, with researchers having to choose a time bracket (e.g. 1650-1710) based on their hypothesis of the dates of the site. Like Binford's linear formula, they rely on using the bore diameter of the pipe stem to find the mean date of the data sample.

== Heighton and Deagan's formula ==
Robert Heighton and Kathleen Deagan introduced a third method for dating pipe stems in 1971. This was developed by measuring 26 stems from 14 different sites dated from 1635 to 1775 and producing a two-step formula based on the mean date of these results. This added methodological sophistication by using a logarithmic formula in the first step and a point of origin formula in the second.
