= Battle of Bloody Mose =

1740 battle of the War of Jenkins' Ear

- Part of the War of Jenkins' Ear
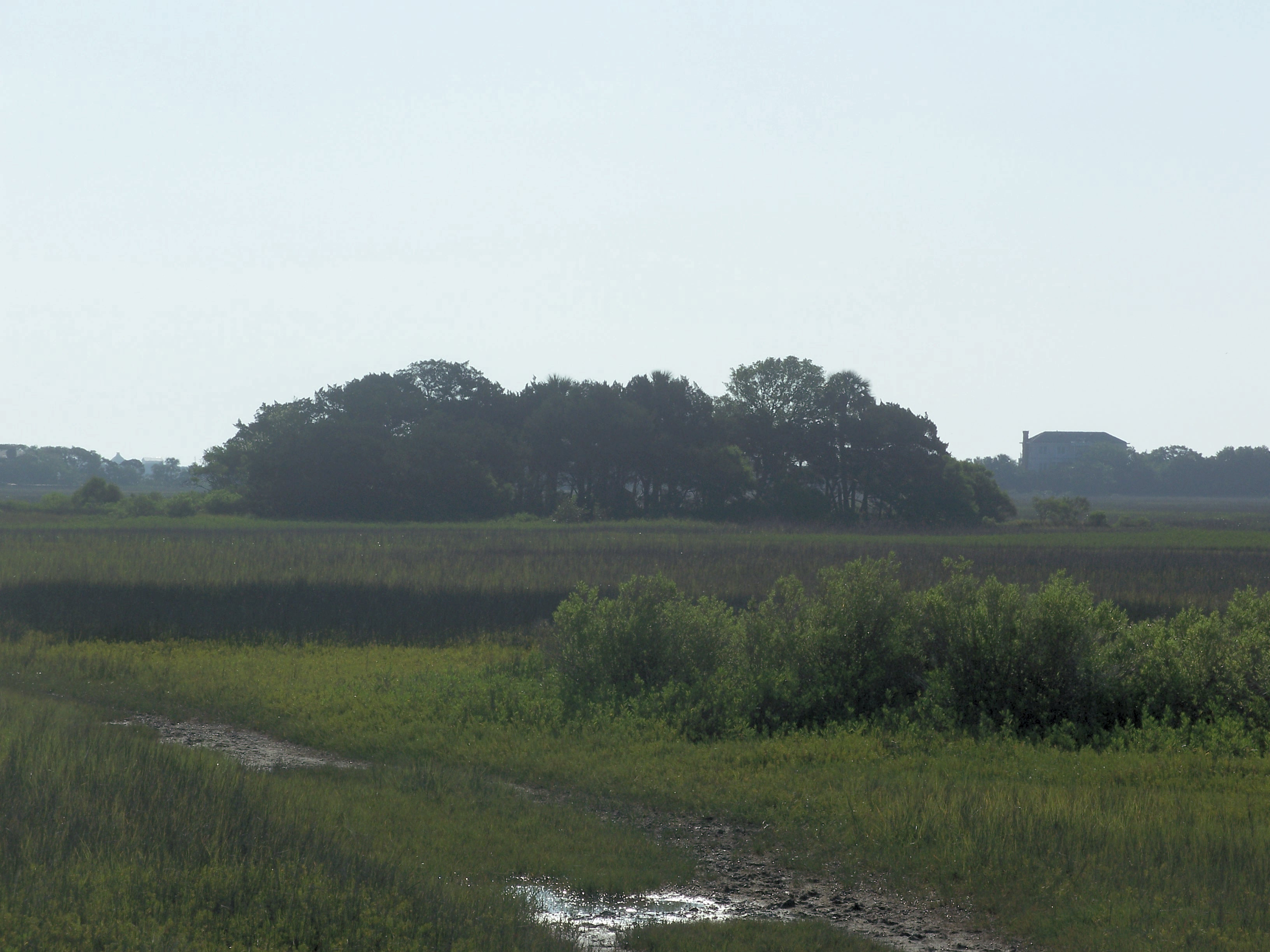
- Site of the battlefield
Date	14 June 1740
Location	Fort Mose, Spanish Florida 29°55′40″N 81°19′31″W
Result	Spanish-Seminole victory

Belligerents
Spain; Seminole	Province of Georgia

Commanders and leaders
Antonio Salgado; Francisco Menéndez	John Palmer †

Strength
300 regulars; Unknown militia and Indians	170 militia and Indians

Casualties and losses
10 killed; 20 wounded	68–75 killed; 34 captured
- Location within Florida Battle of Bloody Mose (North America)

The Battle of Bloody Mose (also known as the Battle of Fort Mose, or Bloody Moosa) was fought on 14 June 1740 at Fort Mose in Spanish Florida during the War of Jenkins' Ear. A Spanish column of 300 regular troops under Captain Antonio Salgado supported by Black militia under Captain Francisco Menéndez and Spanish-allied Seminole warriors attacked Fort Mose, which was defended by 170 British colonial troops from the Province of Georgia and British-allied Indians under Colonel John Palmer.

Palmer's troops had occupied the abandoned fort during the siege of St. Augustine which began on 13 June, and the Spanish were determined to recapture it. Salgado and Menéndez's troops took the garrison of Fort Mose by surprise and inflicted heavy casualties on the defenders, who lost between 68 and 75 men killed and 34 captured with the rest fleeing, while the Spanish and Seminole only suffered 10 killed and 20 wounded. The fort was destroyed in the fighting and Spanish colonial authorities did not rebuild it until 1752.

== Background ==
Located two miles north of St. Augustine, Fort Mose was established in 1738 by colonial authorities in Spanish Florida as a refuge for fugitive slaves from the Southern Colonies of British America. The fort was built as part of policy which dated back to 1693, when Charles II of Spain had ordered Spanish authorities in to offer freedom to fugitive slaves from English North America if they converted to Catholicism and agreed to serve in the colonial militia. The fort consisted of a church and approximately 20 houses inhabited by 100 freed slaves surrounded by a timber wall topped by several towers. Its adult male inhabitants were all part of the colonial militia and served under Captain Francisco Menéndez, a mulatto of African and Spanish descent who had escaped enslavement in the Province of South Carolina.

The fort was built to both encourage more fugitive slaves to flee to Florida and serve as a front-line of defence against British incursions from the Southern Colonies. Word of the fort's construction reached South Carolina, possibly inspiring the Stono Rebellion in September 1739, a slave rebellion in which hundreds of slaves attempted to flee to Florida; several dozen were successful and joined the colonial militia. Following the outbreak of the War of Jenkins' Ear in 1739 the governor of Georgia Brigadier-general James Oglethorpe, encouraged by successful anti-Spanish raids carried out by British forces and their Indian allies on the frontier, decided to raise an expeditionary force to capture the Floridian capital of St. Augustine. Oglethorpe's force included a mixture of regulars and militia, roughly 600 Muscogee and Yuchi warriors and approximately 800 Black slaves, supported at sea by seven British warships. The governor of Florida Manuel de Montiano, who only had 600 regulars including reinforcements which had recently arrived from Cuba, began to entrenching his position. On several occasions he attempted to unsuccessfully attack the British lines by taking them by surprise.

== Battle ==
Approaching St. Augustine, on 13 June a force of 170 men drawn from the Georgia Militia, Highland Independent Company of Darien and British-allied Indians under Colonel John Palmer, rapidly occupied Fort Mose, which was strategically sited on a vital travel route. De Montiano had ordered the fort to be abandoned after several of its inhabitants were killed by British-allied Indians, and the fort's former residents moved to St. Augustine. Palmer's force suffered from internal dissension, with the mostly-Gaelic speaking Highlanders struggling to communicate with the English-speaking militiamen and being distrustful of Palmer's leadership, with Palmer in turn distrusting the Highlanders' military discipline.

While the main body of Oglethorpe's expeditionary force laid siege to St. Augustine, de Montiano considered his options. Knowing the strategic importance of Fort Mose and realising its vulnerabilities, de Montiano decided to undertake a counter-offensive against the British invaders. At dawn on June 14, Captain Antonio Salgado led a column of 300 Spanish regulars which was supported by Black militiamen under Menéndez and Spanish-allied Seminole warriors in a surprise attack against the fort. The attack was initiated while most of Palmer's troops were asleep, and in the bloody hand-to-hand combat which ensued between 68 and 75 defenders were killed and 34 were captured while the attackers lost just 10 men killed and 20 wounded. Palmer was among the dead while the remainder of his force fled, leaving behind a destroyed fort.

== Aftermath ==
The Spanish victory at Fort Mose demoralized the badly divided British forces and was a significant factor in Oglethorpe's withdrawal to Savannah. In late June St. Augustine was relieved by Spanish forces from Havana, and the Royal Navy's warships abandoned the land forces. Governor Montiano commended the maroons for their bravery. Although Fort Mose had been destroyed during the siege, its former residents were resettled in St. Augustine for the next decade as free and equal Spanish colonial citizens. When the Spanish rebuilt the fort in 1752, free blacks returned there. After the British victory against the French in the Seven Years' War, it took over East Florida in a related trade with Spain. Most of the residents and military evacuated to Cuba, and Francisco Menéndez and most of the free blacks went with them.

== See also ==
- Battle of Bloody Marsh
- Invasion of Georgia (1742)
