= Fort Mose =

- Fort Mose Historic State Park
- U.S. National Register of Historic Places
- U.S. National Historic Landmark
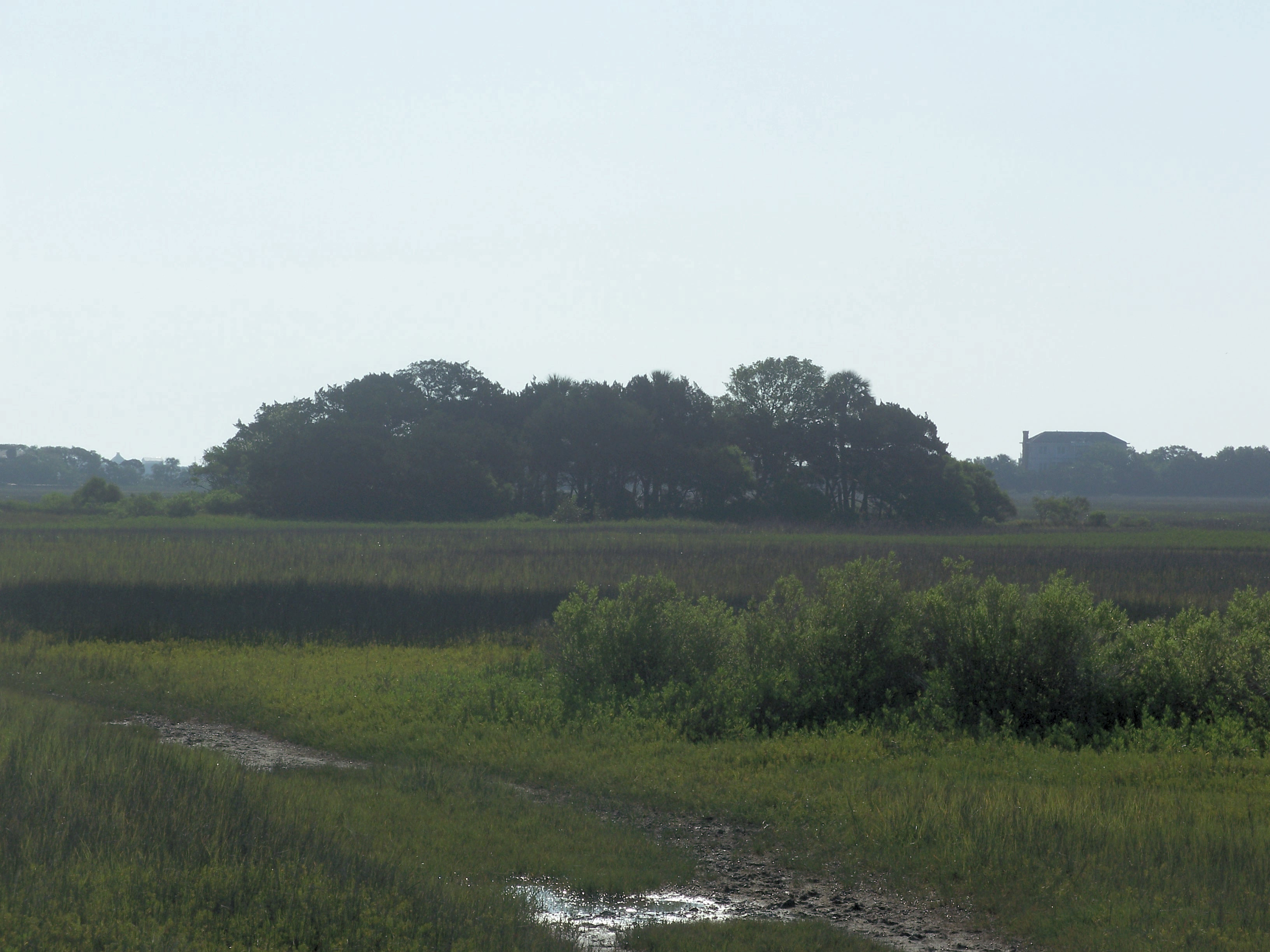
- Site of the old fort

- Location within Florida Location within the United States
- Interactive map of Fort Mose Historic State Park
- Location: St. Augustine, Florida
- Coordinates: 29°55′40″N 81°19′31″W
- Area: 24 acres (9.7 ha)
- NRHP reference No.: 94001645

Significant dates
- Added to NRHP: October 12, 1994
- Designated NHL: October 12, 1994

Fort Mose (originally known as Gracia Real de Santa Teresa de Mose [Royal Grace of Saint Teresa of Mose], and later as Fort Mose, or alternatively Fort Moosa or Fort Mossa) is a former Spanish fort in St. Augustine, Florida. In 1738, the governor of Spanish Florida, Manuel de Montiano, had the fort established as a free black settlement, the first to be legally sanctioned in what would become the territory of the United States. The original fort was briefly abandoned after the Battle of Bloody Mose in 1740, but was rebuilt at a nearby location and again occupied by free Africans from 1752 to 1763. It was designated a US National Historic Landmark on October 12, 1994.

Fort Mose Historic State Park, which now includes a visitors' center and small museum and a historically accurate replica of the original 1738 fort, is located on the edge of a salt marsh on the western side of the waterway separating the mainland from the coastal barrier islands. While the location of the 1738 fort has never been identified, the site of the second fort (1752-1763) was discovered in a 1986 archeological dig. The 24-acre (9.7 ha) area around and including this archaeological site is now protected as a Florida state park, administered through the Anastasia State Recreation Area. Fort Mose is the "premier site on the Florida Black Heritage Trail".

In 2022, the Florida State Parks Foundation was awarded a grant from the Florida African American Cultural and Historical Grants Program to reconstruct the fort for historic purposes. Additional funds were raised from a jazz concert held shortly before the announcement. The replica fort was completed and opened to the public in May 2025.

Fort Mose has become a venue for outdoor concerts. Another blues concert was held in February 2023.

== Colonial history ==
=== Background ===
As early as 1689, the colonial authorities of Spanish Florida had begun to offer asylum to escaped slaves fleeing from the Virginia Colony. One particular place of interest was St. Augustine, where the Spanish had established Mission Nombre de Dios with the help of Afro-Spanish slaves and settlers in the late 16th century.

In 1693, King Charles II of Spain issued a royal decree proclaiming that runaways would be granted asylum in Florida in return for converting to Catholicism, which required baptism with Christian names, and serving for four years in the colonial militia. By 1742 the community had grown into a maroon settlement similar to those in other European colonies in the Americas, and the Spanish utilized the settlement as the first line of defence against outside incursions into Florida.

=== Fort Mose ===
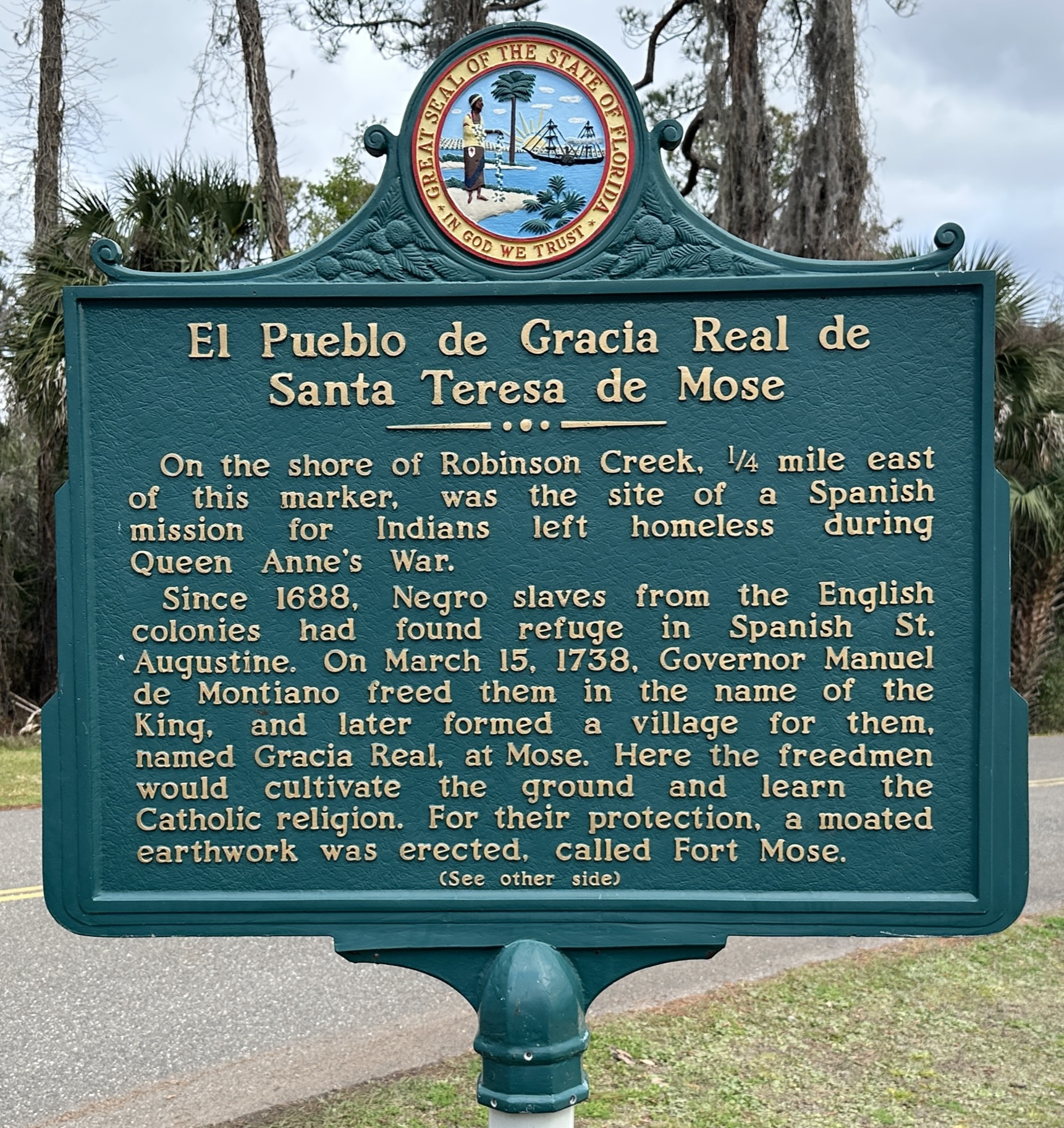
Historical marker, Santa Teresa de Mose (Fort Mose), front

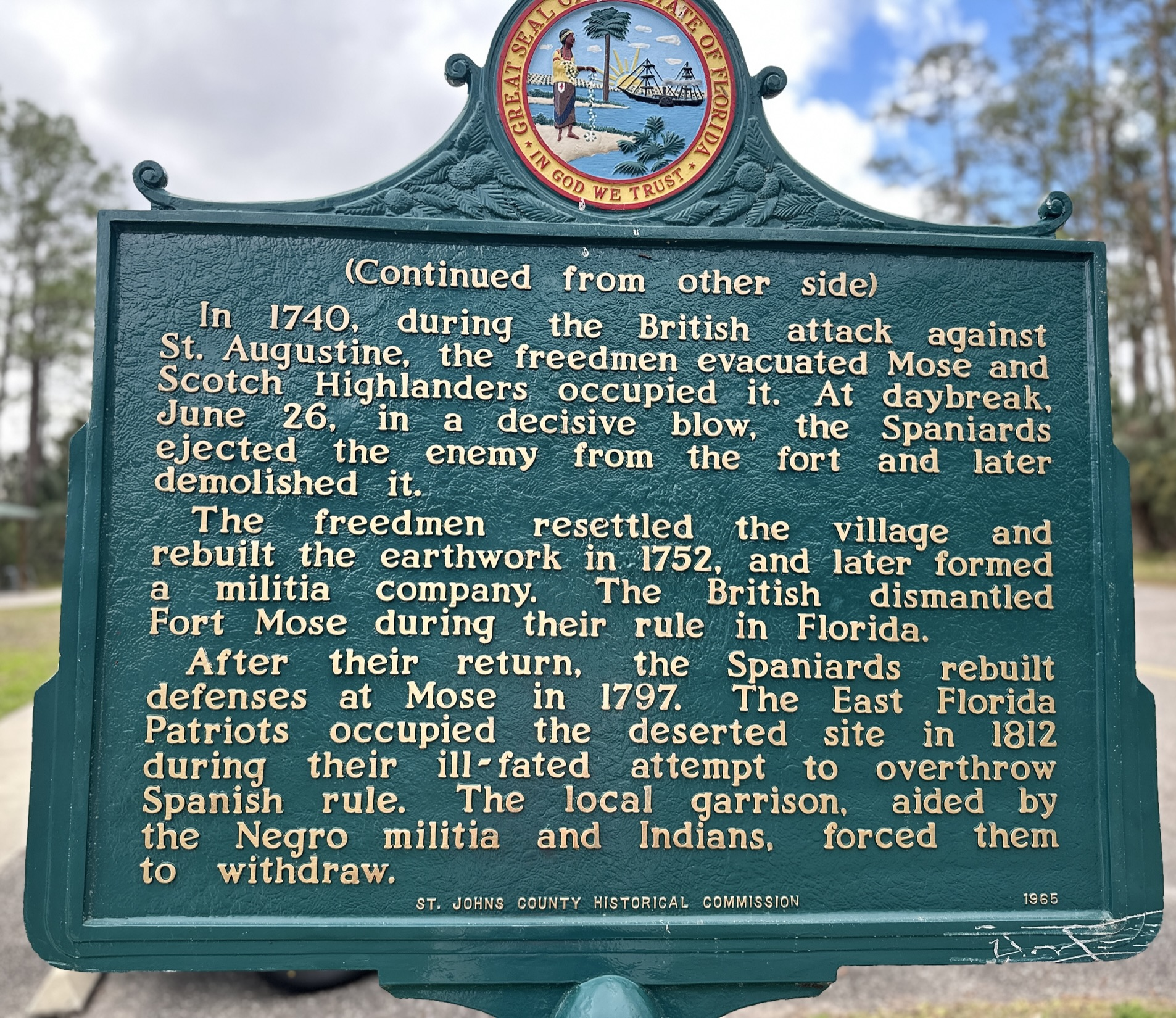
Historical Marker, Santa Teresa de Mose (Fort Mose) (reverse)

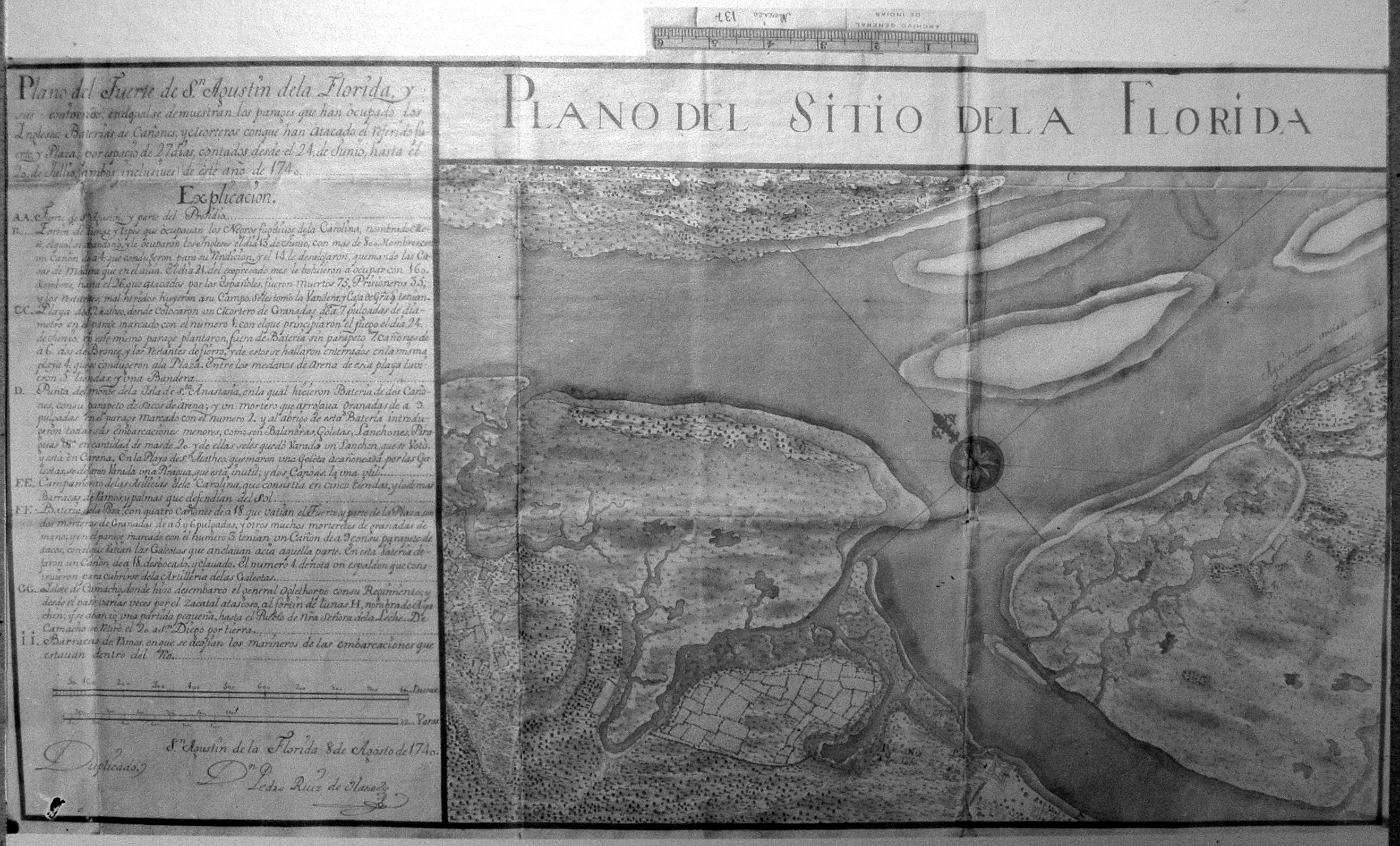
Copy of the plan of the fort of Saint Augustine, Florida and its contours by Royal Engineer Pedro Ruiz de Olano, 1740

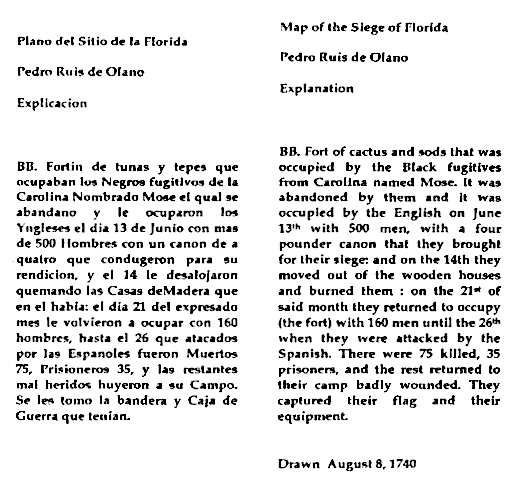
Excerpt from the legend of Olano's map of St. Augustine, Florida and environs, drawn by Spanish royal engineer Pedro Ruiz de Olano. The map depicts Fort Mose and the Castillo de San Marcos during Oglethorpe's siege of 1740.

In 1738, Governor Montiano ordered construction of the Gracia Real de Santa Teresa de Mose military fort, about 2 miles (3 km) north of St. Augustine. Any fugitive slaves discovered by the Spanish were directed to head there. If they accepted Catholicism and were baptized with Christian names, and those capable served in the colonial militia, the Spanish treated them as free. The military leader at the fort, who had since 1726 been the appointed captain of the free black militia at St. Augustine, was a Mandinga born in the Gambia region of Africa, and baptized as Francisco Menéndez. He had been captured by slave traders and shipped across the Atlantic to the colony of Carolina, from where, he, like many other black enslaved persons, escaped and sought refuge in Spanish Florida. His status as a leader was solidified with the Spanish colonial authorities when he helped defend the city from a British attack led by John Palmer in 1728, and distinguished himself by his bravery. He was the de facto leader of the maroon community at Mose. The freedmen under his command used their skills in carpentry, masonry, and blacksmithing to construct both the defensive earthen walls and thatched dwellings of the settlement.

Fort Mose was the first free black settlement of formerly enslaved people legally sanctioned in what would become the United States, and had a population of about 100. The village had a wall around it with dwellings inside, as well as a church and an earthen fort.

Fort Mose's location on the small tidal channel called Mose Creek (Caño Mose) (now generally referred to as Robinson Creek) gave the Mose settlers access to the estuarine mud flats, oyster bars, salt marshes, and other tidal creeks of the Tolomato River, or North River, which joins the Matanzas River to form Matanzas Bay, St. Augustine's harbor. This tidal estuary was a rich source of food. Analysis of faunal remains found at the site by the team zooarchaeologist Elizabeth Reitz indicated that the Mose villagers had a diet very similar to that of the nearby Indian communities, with a heavy dependence on marine proteins and wild foods.

Word of the settlement of free blacks at Mose reached the British colonies of South Carolina and Georgia, and attracted escaping slaves. Fellow blacks and their Indian allies helped runaways flee southward to Florida. The Spanish colony needed skilled laborers, and the freedmen strengthened St. Augustine's military forces.

The existence of Fort Mose is believed to have helped inspire the Stono Rebellion in September 1739. This was led by slaves who were "fresh from Africa". During the Stono revolt, several dozen Africans believed to be from the Portuguese-influenced Kingdom of Kongo tried to reach Spanish Florida. Some were successful, and they rapidly adjusted to life there as they spoke Portuguese and were already baptized Catholics due to the fact that Catholicism was the state religion of Kongo. Further north, a similar rebellion was alleged by British colonists against enslaved Africans in the New York Conspiracy of 1741, which led to the public execution of several accused civilians.

As a military outpost, Mose defended the northern approach to St. Augustine, the capital of La Florida. Most of its inhabitants came originally from numerous different tribal and cultural groups in West Africa (predominately Kongos, Carabalis, and Mandinka) and had been sold into slavery in the colonies of North and South Carolina. While struggling to make their way to freedom in Florida, they had frequent interactions with many Native American peoples. By successfully defending their freedom and Spanish Florida in the mid-18th century, the black inhabitants of Fort Mose had a significant role in contemporary political conflicts between European colonial powers in the southeast.

The people of Mose made political alliances with the Spaniards along with their Indian allies, and took up arms against their former masters. Following the murder of some inhabitants at the fort by Indian allies of the British, Montiano ordered it abandoned and its inhabitants resettled in St. Augustine. The British later occupied the fort themselves.

Fort Mose’s residents adopted Spanish names and Catholic religious practices following their arrival in Spanish Florida, but their daily lives reflected a blend of African, Spanish, and Indigenous traditions. This cultural mixture shaped the community’s social structure, religious expression, and relationships with surrounding populations, resulting in a settlement that was both distinctly African in heritage and integrated into the broader Spanish colonial world.

The black militia fought beside Spanish regular soldiers against British forces under James Oglethorpe, who launched an attack on St. Augustine in 1740 during the War of Jenkins' Ear. During the ensuing conflict, a Floridian force consisting of Spanish troops, Indian auxiliaries, and free black militia counterattacked Oglethorpe's troops and defeated them, destroying the fort in the process. Oglethorpe was eventually forced to withdraw his forces back to Georgia, where the Black Spanish militia also participated in the unsuccessful Spanish counterattack in 1742.

By 1752, the Spanish had returned to and rebuilt Fort Mose in a slightly different location, and the new governor forcibly relocated most of the free blacks back into the defensive settlement, from the more cosmopolitan, multilingual culture of St. Augustine.

After East Florida was ceded to the British in the 1763 Treaty of Paris, some 400 of the slave and free black inhabitants emigrated to Cuba with the evacuating Spanish settlers.

The British refurbished the fort after its evacuation by the Spanish, who later returned in 1784, once again using the fort as a military outpost. It was later occupied by the Florida Patriots, who sought to capture Florida for the newly established United States. An ambush by a Spanish and Indian alliance (again including black combatants) destroyed the fort for a final time in 1812.

== Legacy ==
A haven for refugee slaves mainly from South Carolina and Georgia, Fort Mose is considered the "premier site on the Florida Black Heritage Trail". The National Park Service highlights it as a precursor site of the Underground Railroad. This was the network in the antebellum years preceding the American Civil War by which slaves escaped to freedom, most often to the North and Canada, but also to the Bahamas and Mexico.

=== Modern identification and archaeological investigation of the site ===
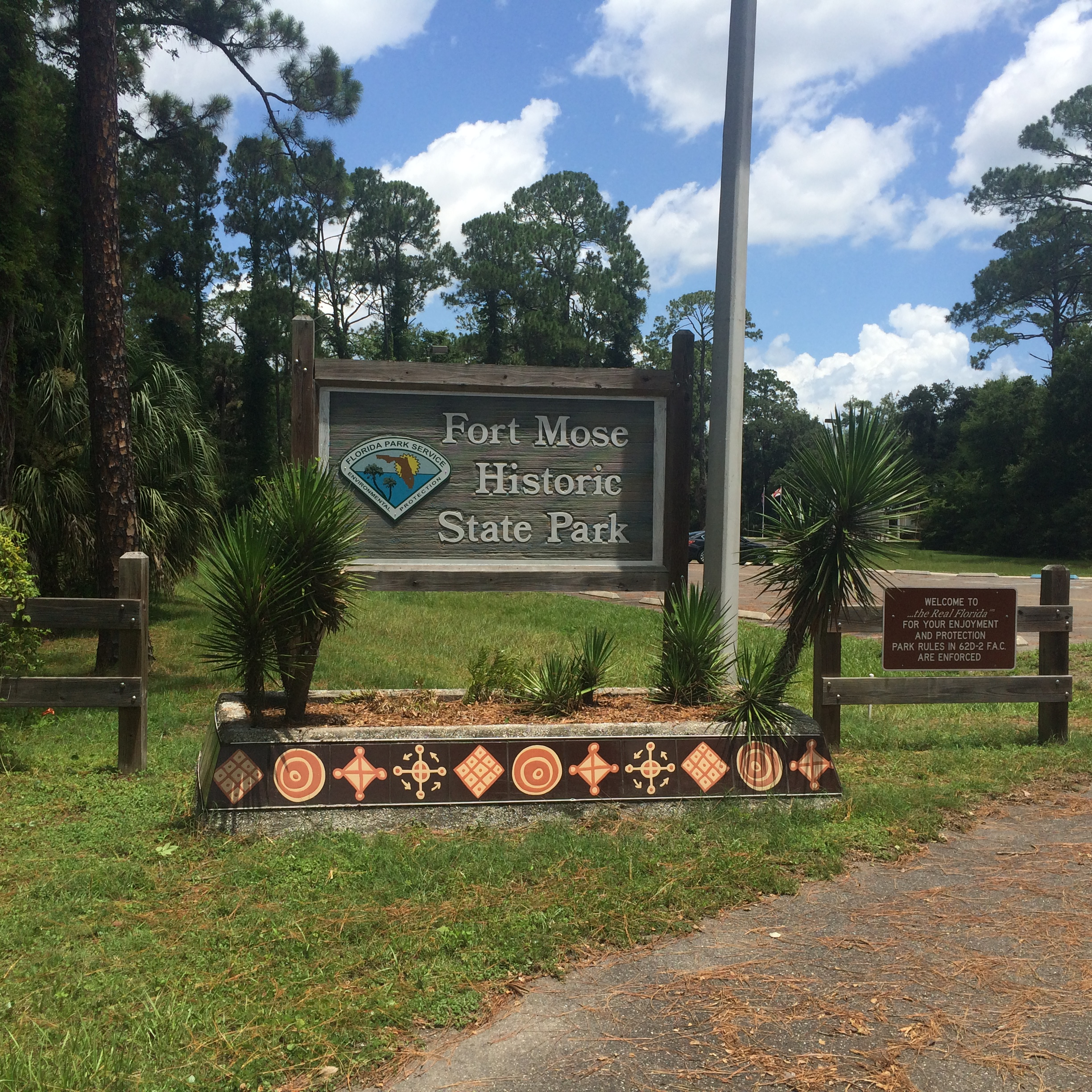
The entrance of Fort Mose Historic State Park.

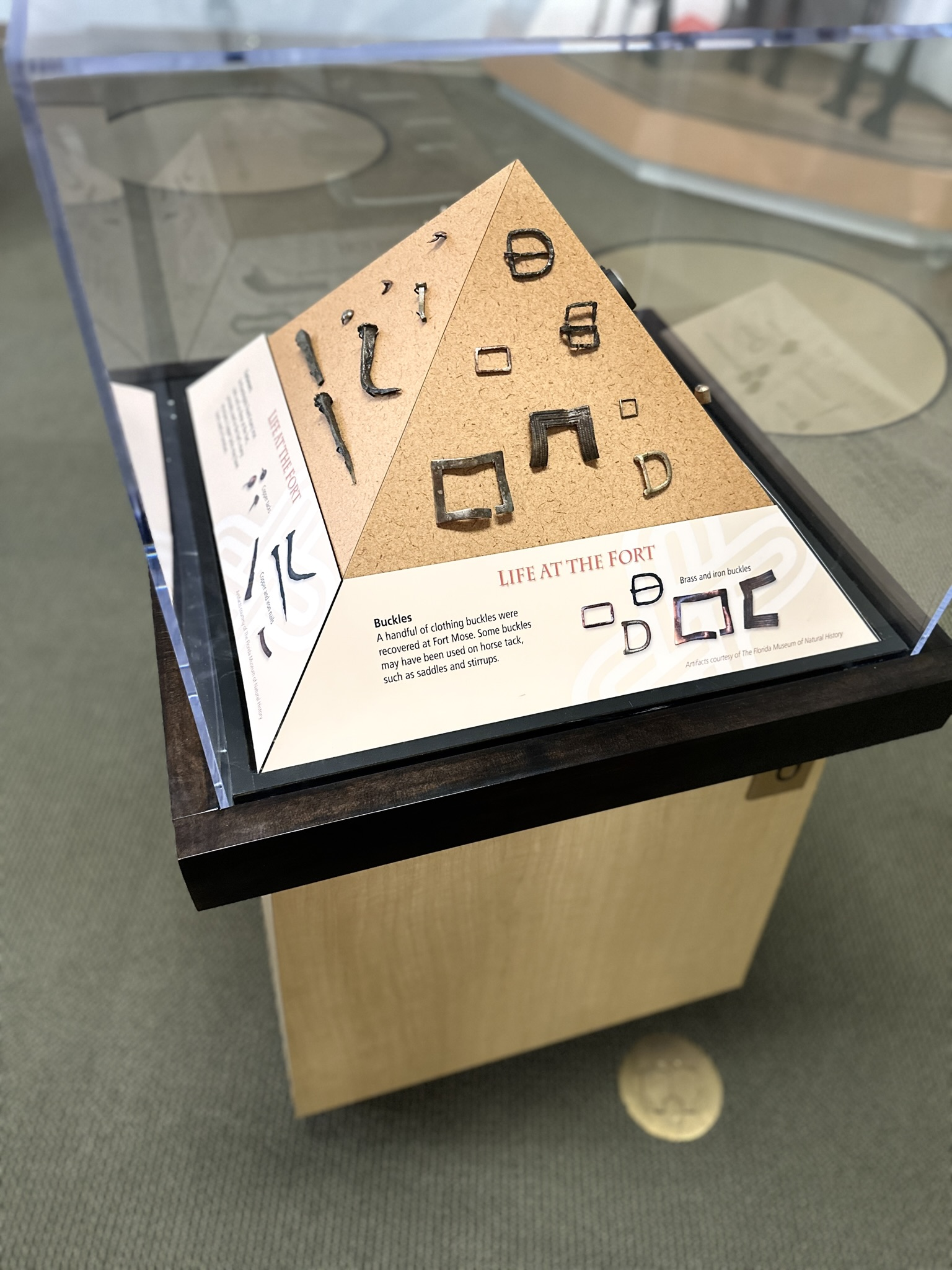
Artifacts found at Fort Mose site, exhibited in Visitors Center

Dr. Carter G. Woodson was the pioneer in calling attention to Black history in the former Spanish colonies in America. In the 1920s he paid for Irene Aloha Wright to gather material at the Archive of the Indies in Seville relating to Fort Mose, and published it in the Journal of Negro History. In 1927 he sent Zora Neale Hurston to St. Augustine to examine what holdings the local historical society had about the fort, and also published her communication.

In 1968, a local military history buff, Frederick Eugene "Jack" Williams, a long time St. Augustine resident, historian and amateur archaeologist, inspired by Baynard Kendrick's 1948 novel The Flames of Time, identified the general location of the fort from an old map. The property had been owned by the St. Augustine Historical Society, but after the civil rights demonstrations of 1963-1964 in the Ancient City, the Society wanted to rid itself of any connection to Black history and put it up for sale. Williams purchased the land (not because of its connection to Fort Mose, he made clear, but because of its connection to an American invasion of Florida at the time of the War of 1812) and began a campaign, later supported by the Black Caucus in the Florida legislature, to have the site excavated.

From 1986 to 1988, a team of specialists, the Fort Mose Research Team—led by Kathleen Deagan of the Florida Museum of Natural History, Jane Landers (then with University of Florida and subsequently with Vanderbilt University), and John Marron of the University of Florida—performed an archaeological and historical investigation at Fort Mose. Their work narrowed down the location of the original fort, and definitively identified the site of the second fort, constructed in 1752. Their discoveries showed that Africans played important roles in the geopolitical conflicts between European colonial powers in the southeast of what is now the United States.

Documents examined by historian Jane Landers in the colonial archives of Spain, Florida, Cuba, and South Carolina reveal who lived in Mose and some idea of what their lives were like in the settlement. In 1759 the village consisted of twenty-two palm thatched huts housing thirty-seven men, fifteen women, seven boys and eight girls. The people of Mose grew their own crops and their men stood guard at the fort or patrolled the frontier in service to the crown. They attended Mass in a wooden chapel where their priest also lived. Most of them married other refugees, but some married Indian women or slaves who lived in St. Augustine.

In the first year of excavating the archaeologists uncovered remains of fort structures, including its moat, clay-daubed earthen walls and the wooden structures inside the walls. They found a wide assortment of artifacts: military paraphernalia such as gunflints, lead shot, metal buckles and hardware; household items such as pipestems, thimbles, nails, ceramics, and bottle glass; and food remnants such as burnt seeds and bone.

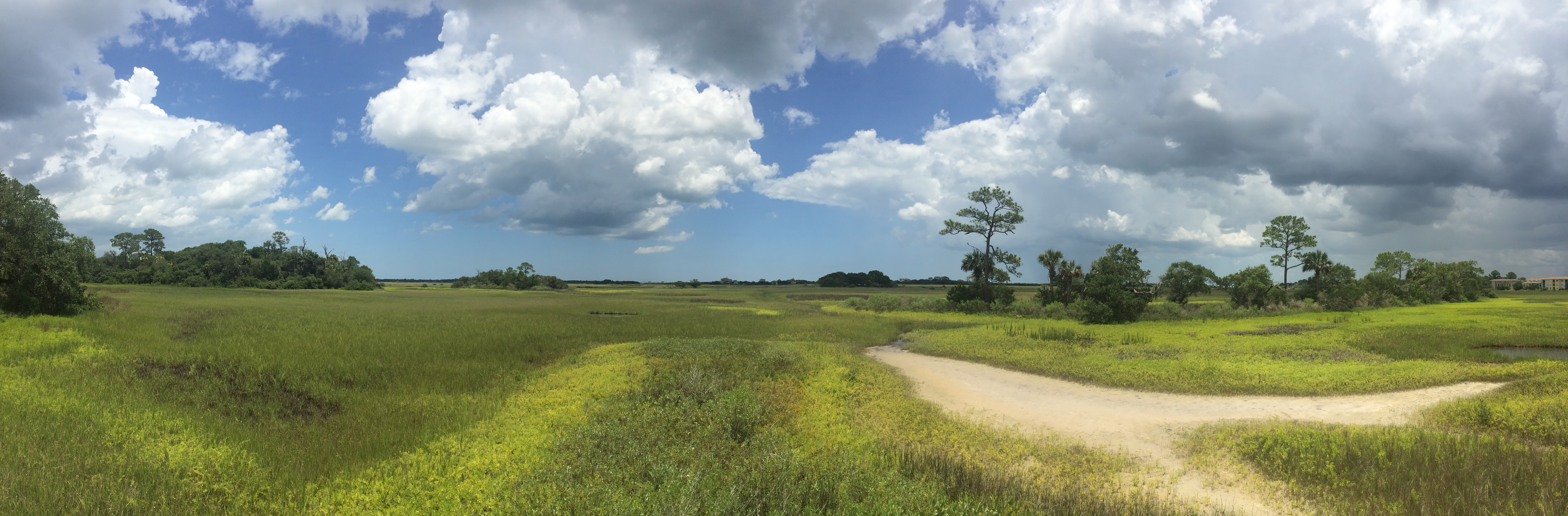
A panorama of the hammocks and salt marsh at the site of Fort Mose.

From 2019 to 2024, new archaeological investigations have been carried out at the site in a project jointly sponsored by Flagler College, the University of Florida, the University of Texas at Austin, and LAMP (Lighthouse Archaeological Maritime Program), the research arm of the St. Augustine Lighthouse & Maritime Museum. Led by Lori Lee, James Davidson, Elizabeth Ibarrola, and Chuck Meide, these excavations are unique in that they have been conducted both on land and underwater in the surrounding creeks, resulting in a wide variety of domestic and military artifacts and food remains from the 1752-1763 Black militia along with other periods of occupation.

More recent archaeological research at Fort Mose has examined personal adornment objects, such as jewelry, recovered from the site. These items offer insight into how residents may have expressed aspects of identity, status, and community within the settlement.

Archaeological and heritage-studies research has emphasized that Fort Mose’s coastal location places the site at increasing risk from sea-level rise and shoreline erosion. Scholars have noted that these environmental threats could endanger in situ deposits and material evidence of the community’s history, and have recommended targeted monitoring and mitigation to preserve both terrestrial and submerged archaeological resources.

Historical sources also show that the inhabitants of Fort Mose accessed a variety of food sources to sustain themselves. According to an NPS brochure, the Spanish government initially supplied corn, biscuits, and beef to the Mose community from St. Augustine stores. In addition, the brochure reports that salt-water creeks around the fort provided abundant fish and shellfish, which would have been a regular part of the diet. Over time, the residents planted their own crops, thereby reducing reliance on government rations, and developed a subsistence economy rooted in the local ecology.

=== State park and replica fort ===
Fort Mose Historic State Park was founded after the initial excavations, and the site was added to the National Register of Historic Places in 1994, recognized as a National Historic Landmark and subsequently designated a World Heritage Site. A key role in the promotion of the site was played by the Fort Mose Historical Society, founded in 1996, involving many leaders of the Black community in St. Augustine.

Today, artifacts are displayed in the museum within the Visitor Center at the park. On the grounds, interpretive panels are used to illustrate the history of the site. Three replicas of historic items have been installed within the park: a choza or cooking hut, a small historic garden, and a small Spanish flat boat called a barca chata.

In January 2024, a groundbreaking ceremony was enacted for the construction of a replica of the 1738 fort on park grounds. This is intended to be a full-scale replica of the original fortification. The construction of a replica open to visitors to the park has been a goal of the Fort Mose Historical Society since the mid-1990s, though the project did not move forward in earnest until the early 2020s when major donations and grants secured the necessary funding, estimated at around $3 million. It was completed in May 2025 with a ceremony on the 9th.

The ribbon-cutting ceremony included reenactments and cultural performances aimed at bringing the settlement’s history to life for visitors. The reconstructed fort has since become a focal point for public history programming, seeking to highlight Fort Mose’s national significance.

== In popular culture ==
The story of Fort Mose is told in a juvenile book published in 2010 by Deagan and Darcie MacMahon. It contains material not typically found in a children's book: an index, a long list of sources, internet resources, and documentation for all the illustrations. Landers has also written a full-length history of Spanish Florida, which covers Mose in detail.

=== Fort Mosé Bourbon ===
In 2022, a Black-owned Fort Lauderdale distillery released Fort Mosé [sic] Bourbon.

== Gallery ==
These panels are posted at the Visitor Center in Fort Mose Historic State Park.

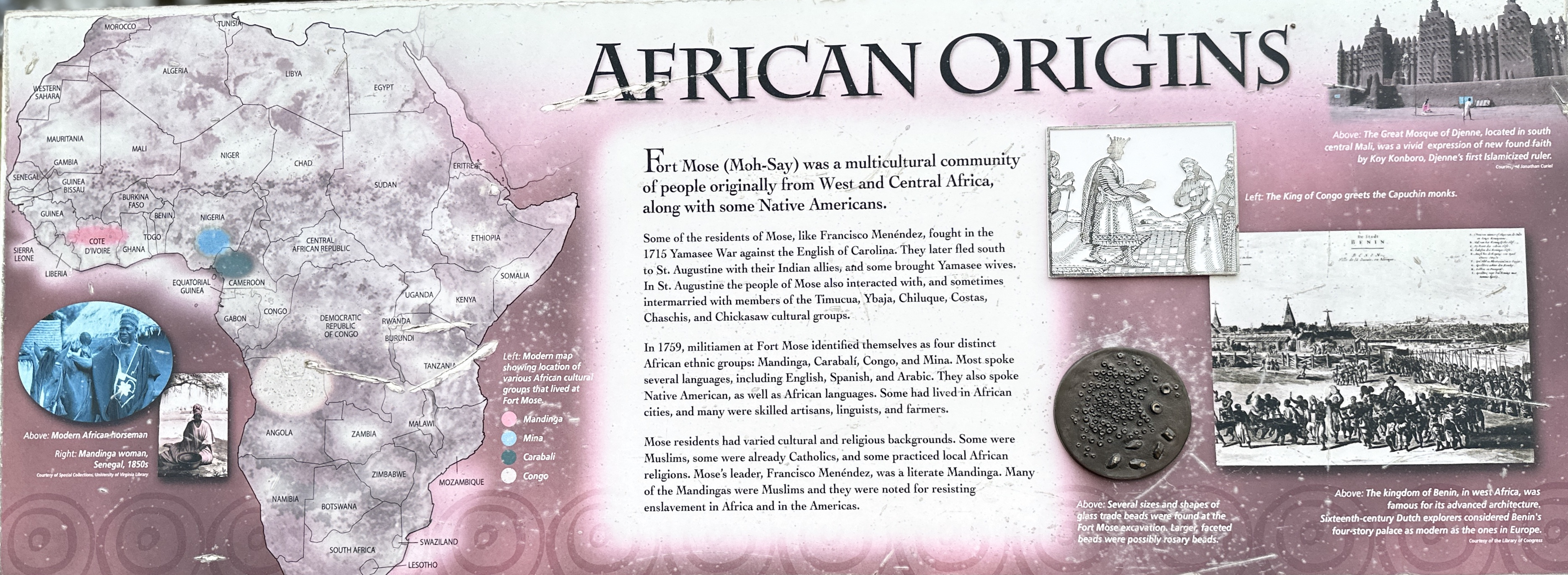
African Origins

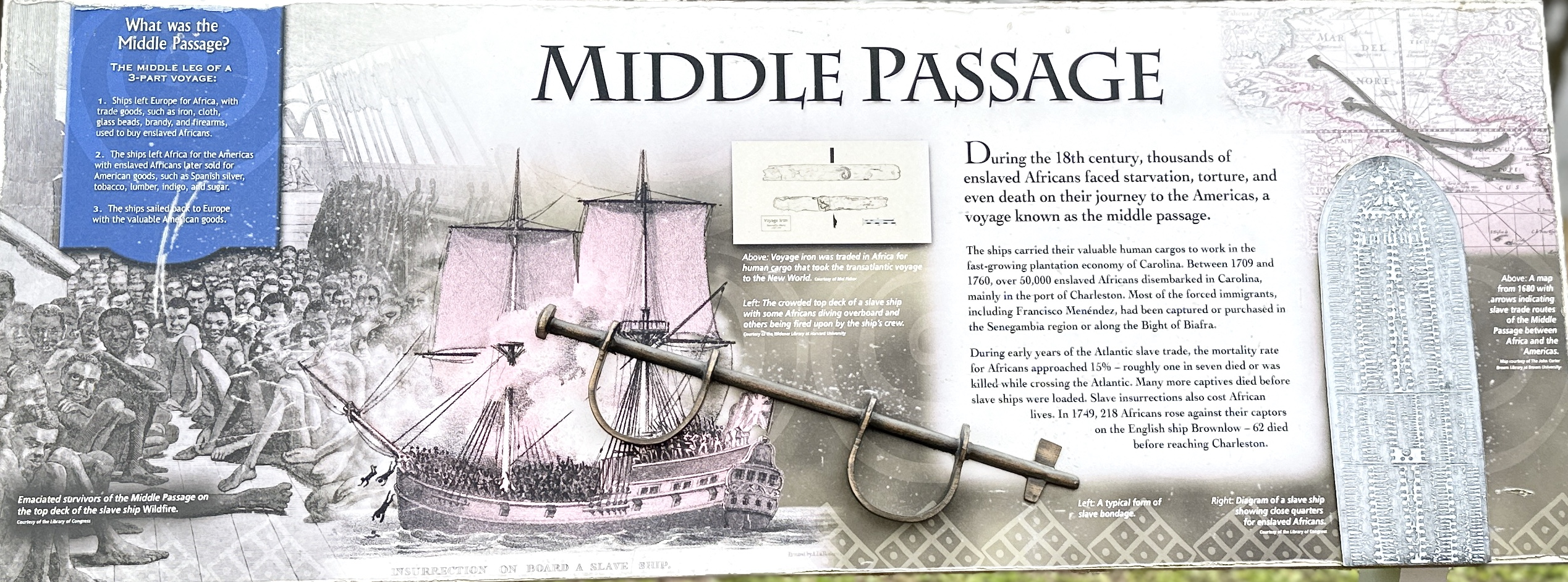
Middle Passage

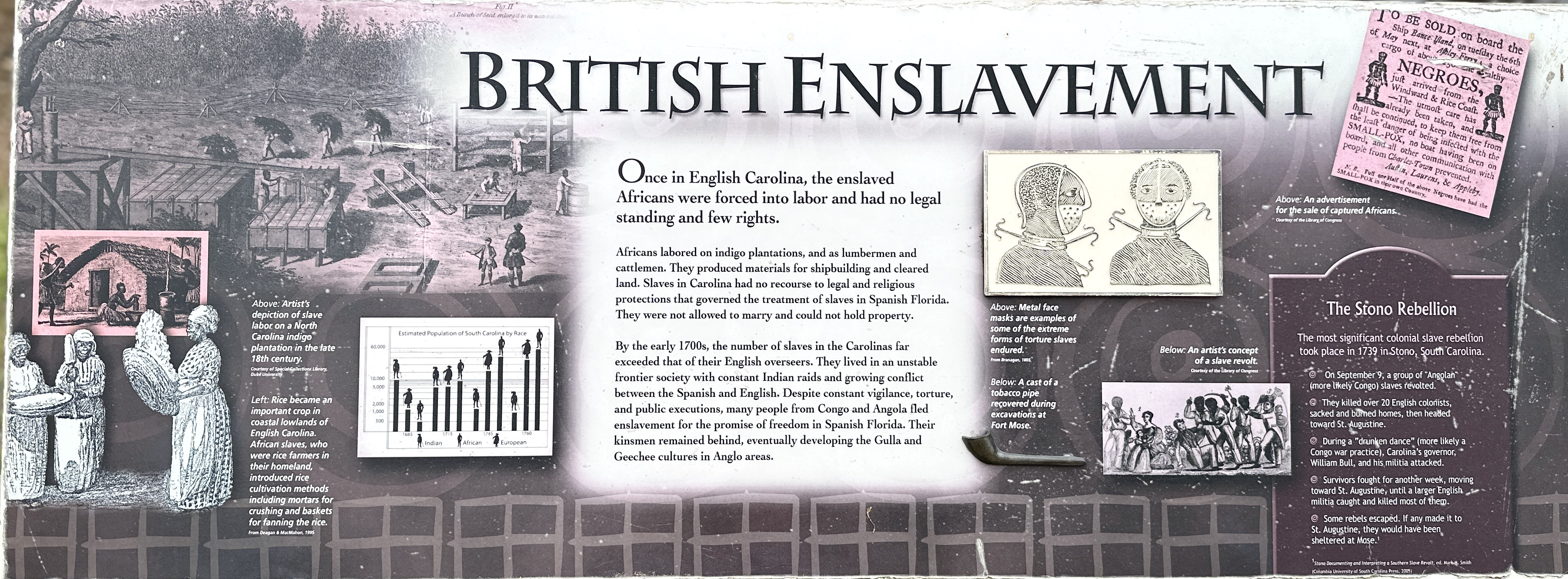
British Enslavement

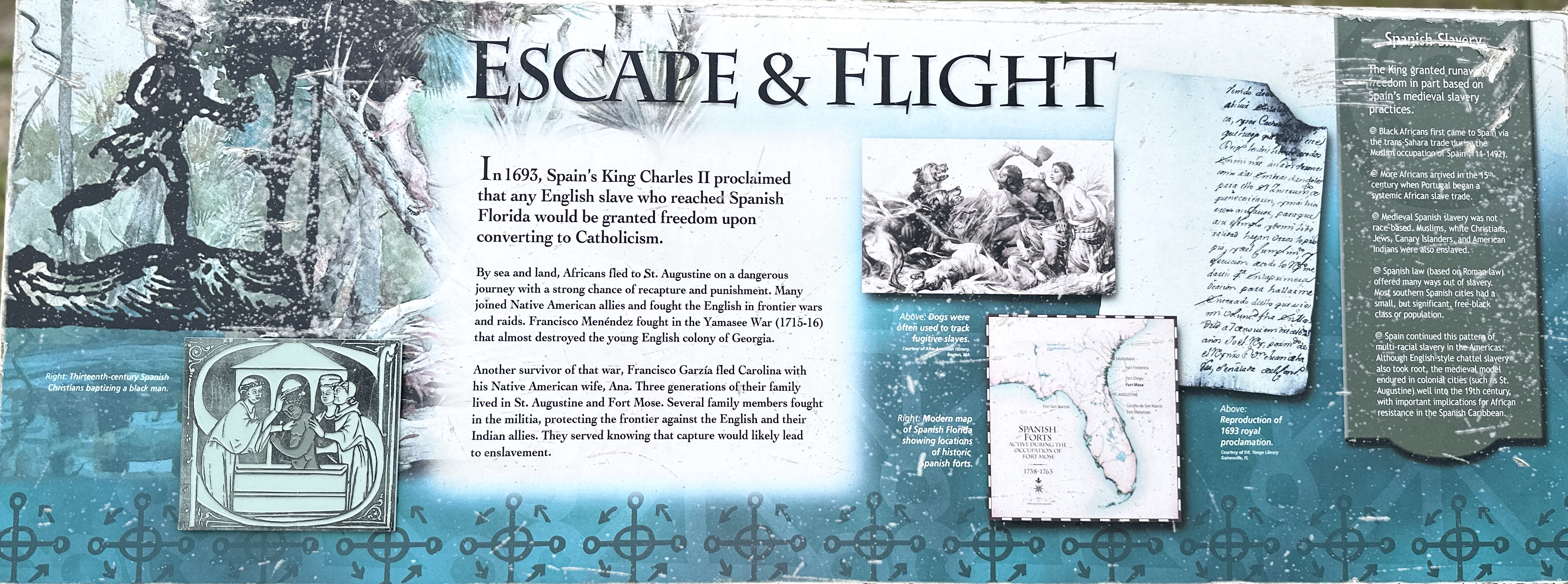
Escape and Flight

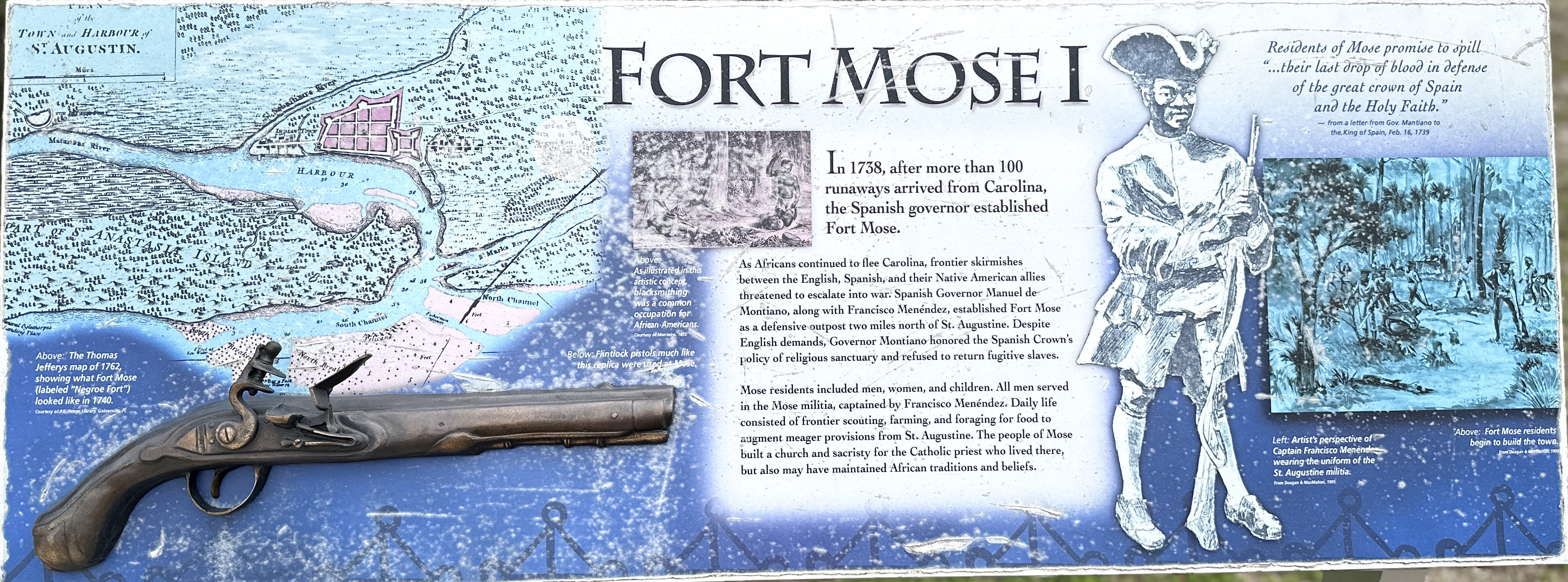
Fort Mose I

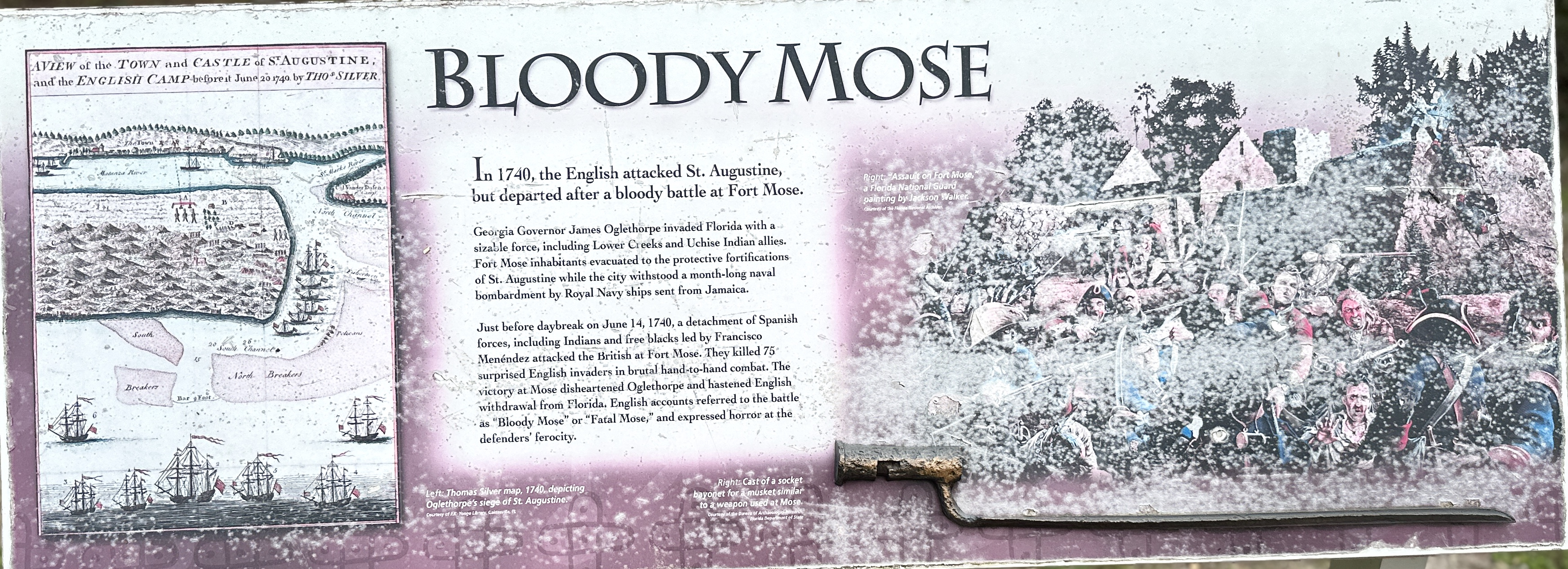
Bloody Mose

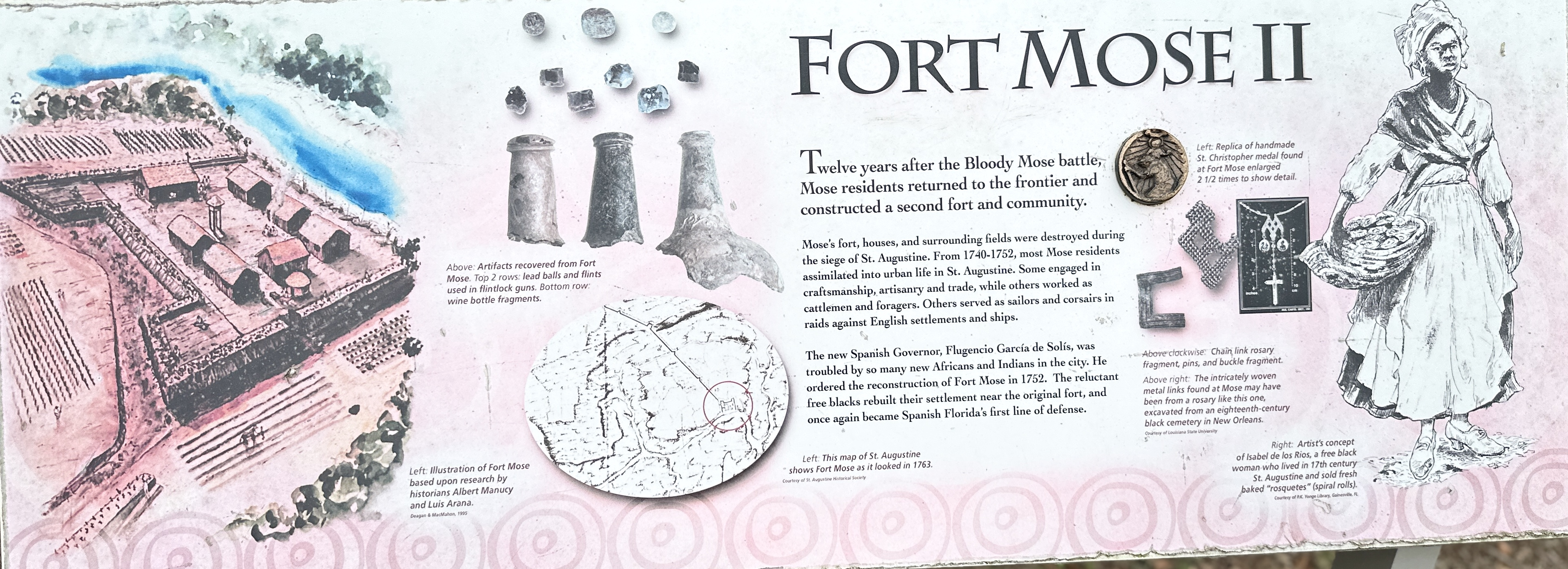
Fort Mose II

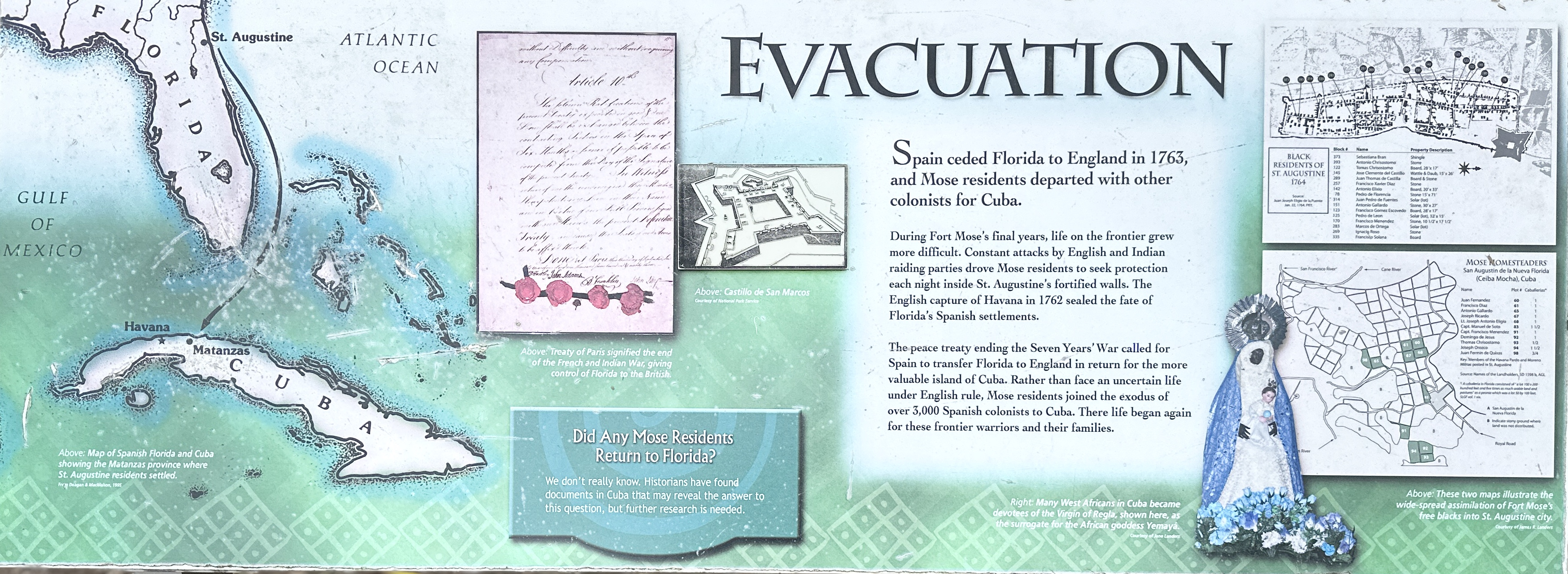
Evacuation

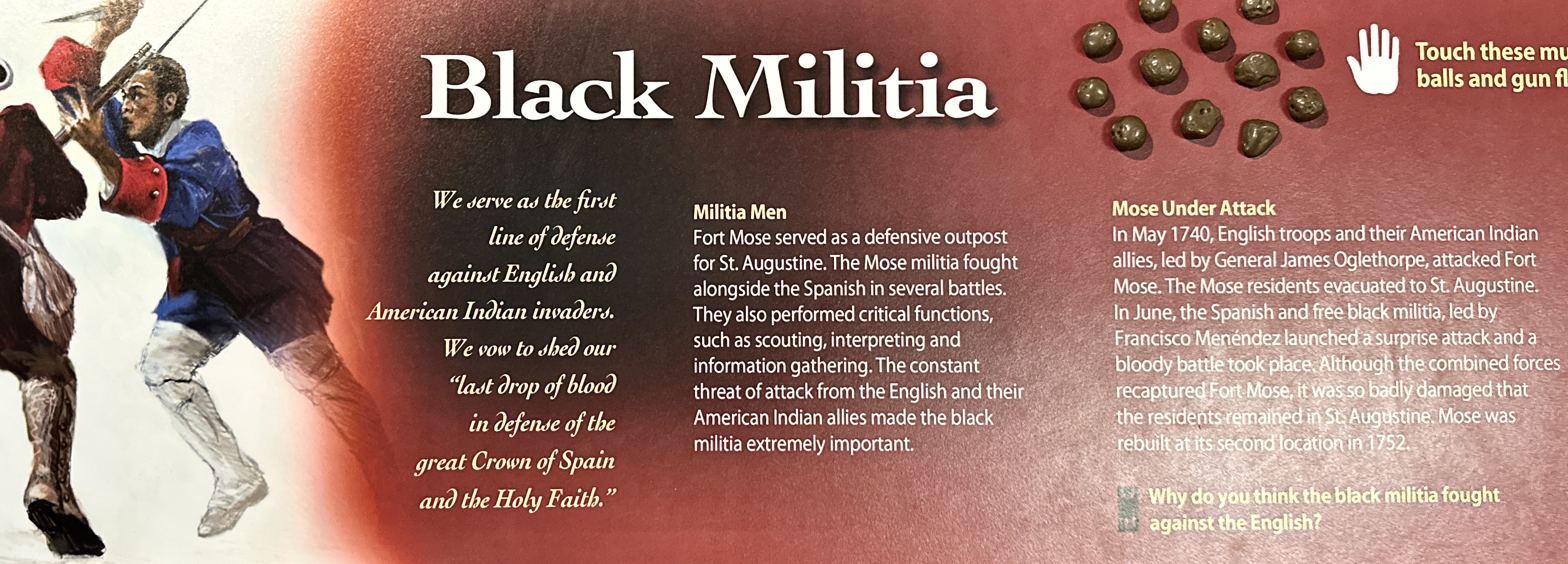
Black Militia

== See also ==
- Francisco Menéndez (black soldier)
- Negro Fort
- Runaway slaves in Spanish Florida
- Siege of Fort Mose
- Siege of St. Augustine (1740)
