= Kathleen A. Deagan =

American archaeologist

- Born: Kathleen Anne Deagan; Portsmouth, Virginia
- Other names: Kathy Deagan
- Occupations: archaeologist, academic
- Years active: 1970-present

Kathleen A. Deagan is an American archaeologist who primarily focuses on excavations in Florida and the Caribbean. Known for her historic archaeology which uncovered the colonial past of La Florida, and work in St. Augustine, she has received multiple awards and honors, including the Award of Merit in 1992 and the J. C. Harrington Award in 2004, both bestowed by the Society for Historical Archaeology.

== Early life ==
Kathleen Anne Deagan was born in the middle of the 20th century in Portsmouth, Virginia, while her father, a meteorologist with the U. S. Navy was stationed at the Norfolk Naval Shipyard. The oldest child in a Catholic family of four children, she attended more than twenty schools before graduating from high school, as her father, a specialist in tropical storms, was assigned to hurricane prone places like England, Guam, the Philippines, and Taiwan, as well as in the United States, Florida, New Jersey, and Rhode Island. Most of the schools were Catholic institutions like the Academy of Our Lady of Guam, one of four high schools Deagan attended.

Deagan enrolled at the University of Florida in 1965 to study education, then journalism, social work and counseling, appropriate career choices for women at the time, but was drawn to anthropology courses. Studying under Charles H. Fairbanks, she switched her major and graduated in 1970. Enrolling in graduate school at the University of California, Davis to study museology, Deagan quickly left and spent some time in San Francisco. In 1971, she returned to the University of Florida and completed a PhD in archaeology under Fairbanks in 1974.

== Career ==
That same year Deagan was hired as an assistant professor at Florida State University and expanded work begun during her dissertation in St. Augustine on the 18th-century history of the city. In 1979, her research shifted to the 16th-century population, making comparisons between the two eras and analyzing the town's development. Her study confirmed the rapid decline of the indigenous native population, the Timucua, after contact and the replacement of them with other indigenous peoples. Deagan also undertook research concerning the influence of Indigenous customs and cooking among the Spanish colonies in the Americas. Her research found that many households in Spanish America utilized indigenous customs and cooking, a pattern which she later confirmed while conducting research in South America and the Caribbean.

In 1981, when Fairbanks retired from the University of Florida, Deagan was recruited to fill his post at the Florida State Museum and take over the direction of the ongoing project at the Puerto Real settlement near present-day Cap-Haïtien, Haiti. The colony, established on Hispaniola by Nicolás de Ovando y Cáceres, thrived from 1503 to 1578. Running the annual field schools at the site, in 1983, Deagan expanded their search to include the nearby site where the Santa María, one of Columbus's ships which ran aground in 1492. Based on a review of evidence at the site, known as both La Navidad and En Bas Saline, Deagan concluded that the shipwreck was not due to a weather related issue, but negligence on behalf of the crew. While working on the site in Haiti, she met Lawrence Dean Harris (1942–2010), a wildlife conservationist who was in Haiti to consult on a project to create a national park in the country. Soon after, Harris, a father of four, and Deagan married.

Simultaneously working sites in Florida and the Caribbean, in 1986, Deagan began fieldwork at Ft. Mosé, a legally sanctioned, buffer zone community of free blacks established as a strategic defensive barrier against outside incursions. Working in conjunction with Jane Landers, who specializes in African American history, worked for six months to evaluate documents from Spanish archives on the site prior to excavations. While many histories up to that point had included interaction with Spaniards and Native American peoples, few had included interaction with Africans and their findings sparked additional scholarship, as well as a movement to preserve the site as a National Historic Landmark. Deagan's next Caribbean project, in the Dominican Republic began in 1989 with an investigation of La Isabela, Columbus's first permanent settlement in the Americas. Because the community existed from 1493 to 1498, it was a "wholly 15th-century" location, yielding information on period flora and fauna, as well as social construction and technology. In 1992, Deagan was honored with the Award of Merit from the Society for Historical Archaeology.

In 1993, Deagan discovered the original settlement site of the fort at St. Augustine. For sixty years, archaeologists had searched for the original location of the fort, built by Pedro Menéndez de Avilés in 1565. The later Castillo de San Marcos was built in the 17th century and lies to the south of the original fort, which was located near the monument to Nuestra Senora de la Leche adjacent to the Fountain of Youth Archaeological Park. Though artifacts and house footings had indicated 16th-century use of the site, the find of the moat confirmed the location and established conclusively that the Spaniards had colonized Florida long before the British had established the colony of Jamestown or the Plymouth Colony. In 1995, Deagan initiated an excavation at Concepción de la Vega in the interior of the Dominican Republic. The settlement was founded in 1496 and occupied until 1562.

That same year, 1995, Deagan was honored as a Distinguished Research Curator of the Florida Museum of Natural History. In 1997, she was honored with an award as an Outstanding Alumna of the University of Florida and in 1999 was designated by the research foundation of the university as a Distinguished Research Professor. She was the 2004 recipient of the J. C. Harrington Award of the Society for Historical Archaeology. In 2007 Deagan was awarded the Order of La Florida by the City of St. Augustine for her work in developing the history of the city. Retiring from teaching in 2010, she was appointed as the Lockwood Professor of Florida and Caribbean Archaeology and received an honorary doctor of laws from Flagler College in 2011.

Continuing her work as curator of the Florida Museum of Natural History and leading excavations in the area around St. Augustine, Deagan began to search for the field notes and artifacts which had been unearthed by archaeologist John Mann Goggin in the early 1950s. In 2013, she received a telephone call from a woman in Martinez, California who had gathered all the materials to complete his graduate work in Connecticut. Though he never finished his degree, the student kept the materials and moved them with his family to Chicago, later to New Mexico and finally to California. When he died, his daughter discovered the items in the family garage and Deagan arranged shipment of them to Florida. The 12,000 artifacts and field notes helped determine the size of the original settlement and led to clues of a possible new defensive construction, which might indicate an additional fort. The following year, the owners of the Fountain of Youth Park donated 97,000 artifacts which had been excavated from the property over a 65-year period to the museum and Deagan returned to the Park to evaluate the site anew from her discoveries in the field notes from 1950. In 2017 the research curator emerita retired as the Lockwood Professor, but continued to pursue excavations in St. Augustine.

Deagan currently serves on the board of University of Florida Historic St. Augustine, Inc, a direct-support organization of the University of Florida which ensures the long-term preservation of historic properties in St. Augustine.

== Selected works ==
Over her career, Deagan authored and edited over a dozen books and monographs, over two-dozen chapters of books and over four-dozen articles. She presented over one hundred papers and was recognized with book awards from the Florida Historical Society for her work on Fort Mose and the Society for American Archaeology for her work on La Isabela. Among her most noted contributions are:

- Artifacts of the Spanish Colonies of Florida and the Caribbean, 1500-1800. Washington, D.C.: Smithsonian Institution Press. 1987. ISBN 978-0-874-74393-7.
- Puerto Real: The Archaeology of a Sixteenth-century Spanish Town in Hispaniola. Gainesville, Florida: University Press of Florida. 1995. ISBN 978-0-813-01334-3.
- Fort Mose: Colonial America's Black Fortress of Freedom. Gainesville, Florida: University Press of Florida. 1995. ISBN 978-0-813-01351-0. (with Darcie MacMahon).
- Archaeology at La Isabela: America's First European Town. New Haven, Connecticut: Yale University Press. 2002. ISBN 978-0-300-09041-3. (with José María Cruxent).
