= British Army independent companies in South Carolina =

Military units

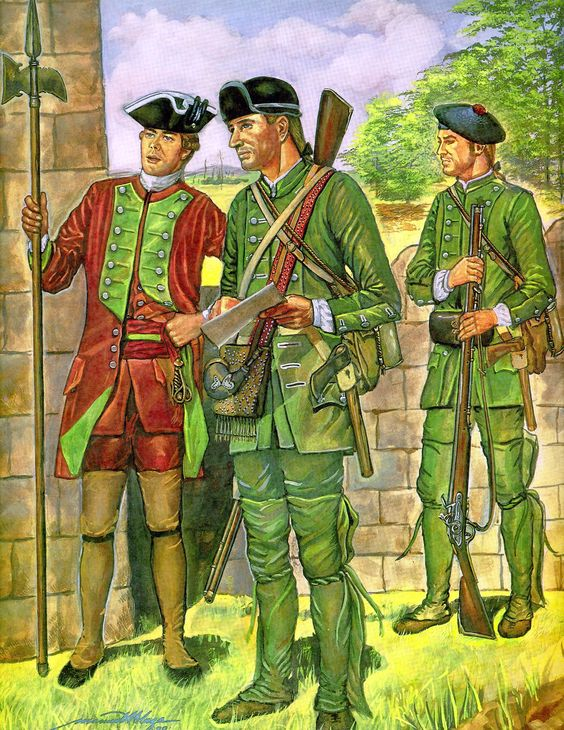
A sergeant of an independent company (left) and two Rogers' Rangers (right), during the French and Indian War.

British Army independent companies in South Carolina formed a major component of the Province of South Carolina's military forces. Regular independent companies were first established in English America in 1664. The first independent company in South Carolina was organized in 1721. With the raising of Oglethorpe's Regiment in 1737 it was disbanded. In 1746 three understrength independent companies were sent to South Carolina, but they were disbanded two years later. When Oglethorpe's Regiment was disbanded in 1748, three new independent companies were raised in South Carolina, partly recruited with soldiers from the disbanded regiment. These three companies participated in the French and Indian War and the Cherokee War, participating in the Battle of Fort Necessity, the Braddock Expedition, the battle of the Monongahela, and the siege of Fort Loudoun. They were disbanded in 1763, with the rest of the British army's independent companies in North America.

== Background ==
Independent companies are military units not belonging to a regiment. In England, independent garrison companies existed since the end of the 15th century. The first three English independent companies in North America arrived in Boston in 1664, and were used to conquer the Dutch colony of New Netherland. During the French and Indian Wars, independent garrison companies were stationed not only in the New York Colony, but also in Massachusetts Bay, Virginia, and South Carolina. In 1740, the four independent companies of New York were the only in the Thirteen Colonies, but after the disbandment of Oglethorpe's Regiment in 1748 three new independent companies were raised for service in South Carolina. The four companies in New York and the three companies in South Carolina were the independent companies that served during the French and Indian War.

== Standing in the community ==
The independent companies were recruited in Britain and the soldiers rarely, if ever, returned to the old country after having left the service. The British Army was largely recruited among the poor and the criminal classes; yet, the independent companies had lower status. Their ranks were often filled with people who had left the regular service; former soldiers mainly, but also deserters. The officers were often promoted non-commissioned officers. As the independent companies were virtually ignored by the military authorities in Britain they became dependent on the local American communities, often relying on them for food, clothing, and housing. Soon they became rooted in the local society; transforming the military service into a sideline of a civilian occupation.

== South Carolina 1721–1737 ==
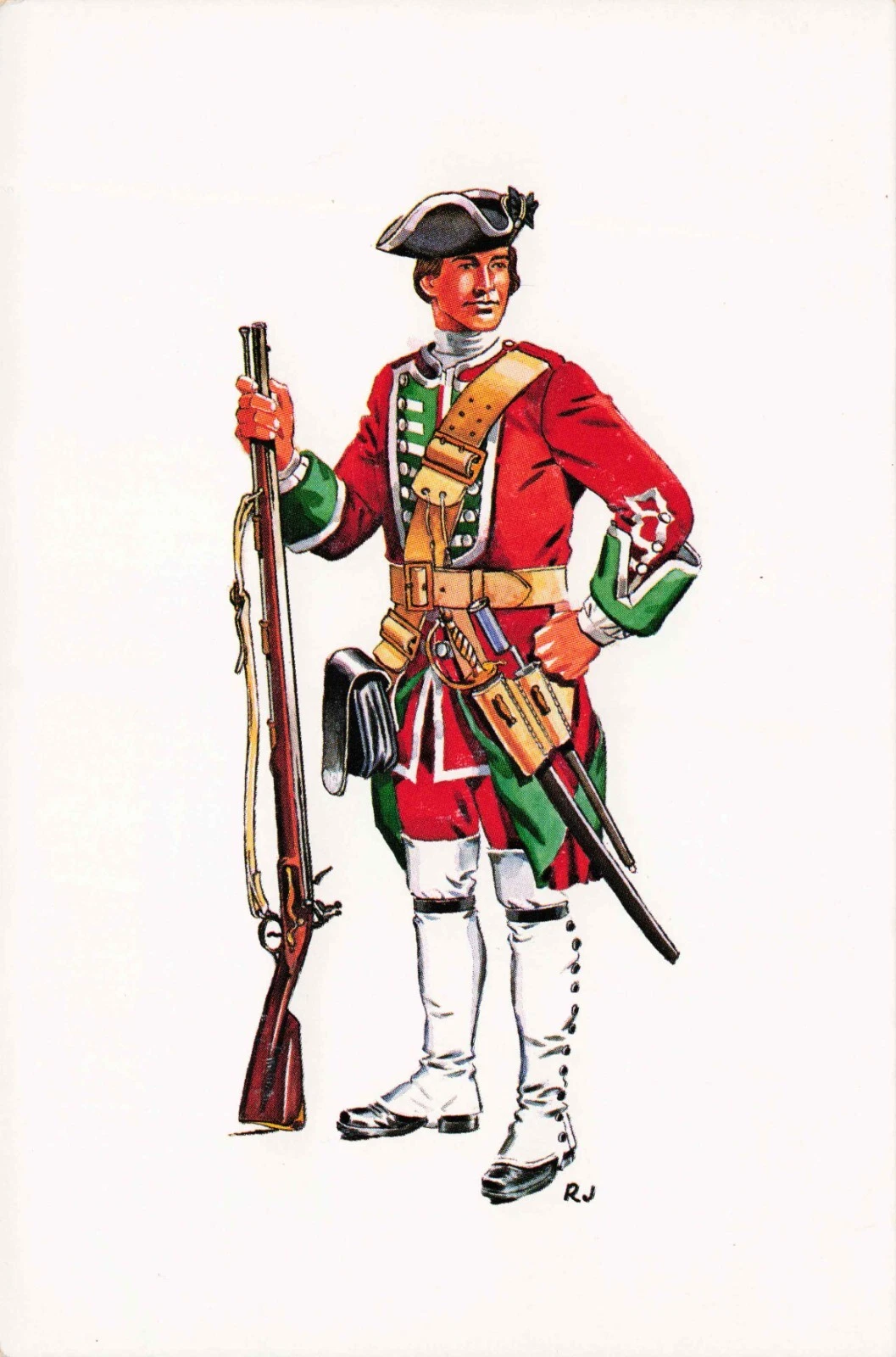
A private of Oglethorpe's Regiment, which the South Carolina independent company formed the nucleus of

In the face of an expected Spanish threat, in 1719 the Province of South Carolina requested military aid from Britain. The British government drafted men from garrison companies in Britain and raised a 100-strong independent company which was sent to South Carolina in 1721. Upon its arrival the company was sent to garrison Fort King George, which was previously built and garrisoned by South Carolinian militia. A fire in 1727 destroyed the fort, causing the company to move to Port Royal Island. In 1730 part of the company was transferred to St. Simons Island in the Province of Georgia, where they built and garrisoned Fort Delegal. When James Oglethorpe's Regiment of Foot was raised in 1737 the South Carolina independent company was disbanded and used to form the nucleus of the new regiment.

== South Carolina 1746–1749 ==
During King George's War, South Carolina was not content with being protected by troops based in Georgia, and asked the government in London for troops stationed in the colony. In 1746 three understrength independent companies were sent to South Carolina, their 60 officers and other ranks forming a core for enlargement; the missing men to be recruited in Charleston and Virginia. After the end of the war, the companies were disbanded together with Oglethorpe's Regiment. Three new independent companies would be recruited, however, to serve in South Carolina. The discharged soldiers could enlist in the new companies, return to England, or remain in Georgia.

== South Carolina 1749–1763 ==
In the preludes to the French and Indian War, Lieutenant Colonel George Washington had been ordered to remove the French from Fort Duquesne. In addition to the 300 men from his own provincial Virginia Regiment, an independent company from South Carolina was sent under the command of Captain James Mackay to his aid; ultimately suffering defeat and surrender with Washington at the Battle of Fort Necessity. Captain Mackay, being an officer with the King's commission, refused to obey Washington's orders, as coming from a provincial officer. Washington left Mackay and his company at Fort Necessity when initially moving forward towards Fort Duquesne, since the captain refused to let his men work on the road Washington was making through the woods, without extra pay. At the battle, however, they fought with fervor, suffering greater losses than the Virginians.

Later, the company, now under Captain Paul Demere, participated in Braddock's Expedition, again suffering a defeat, now at the battle of the Monongahela. When inspected, it was found to be in much better military order than the two independent companies from New York also joining the expedition. At the battle they formed the rearguard together with a provincial company of Virginia rangers. During the expedition's confused retreat, the steadfastness and fighting spirit of these two companies saved the remnants of the army from being surrounded and totally annihilated.

A second South Carolina independent company, under Captain Raymond Demere participated in the construction of Fort Loudon on the Tennessee River in 1756, built on the request of the Cherokees in the Overhill Cherokee country. The fort was then garrisoned by the company, with Captain Demere as its commandant. In 1757, the command was transferred to Captain Paul Demere. The beginning of the Cherokee War saw South Carolina Independent Companies in garrison at Charleston, Fort Prince George, and Fort Loudoun. Soon hostile Cherokees invested both forts. Fort Loudoun had to surrender in 1760; all the officers except one being killed after the surrender, the men becoming Cherokee hostages. After the war, the prisoners were ransomed and released. Fort Prince George held out until finally relieved in 1761.

== Disbandment ==
In 1763, all the independent companies in British North America were disbanded as a matter of policy; being replaced by regular British army regiments permanently stationed in America.

== Campaigns ==
- Fort Duquesne Campaign, 1754.
- Braddock's Campaign, 1755.
- Cherokee War, 1759–1761.

== See also ==
- Independent Highland Companies
