= Oglethorpe's Regiment =

Line infantry regiment of the British Army

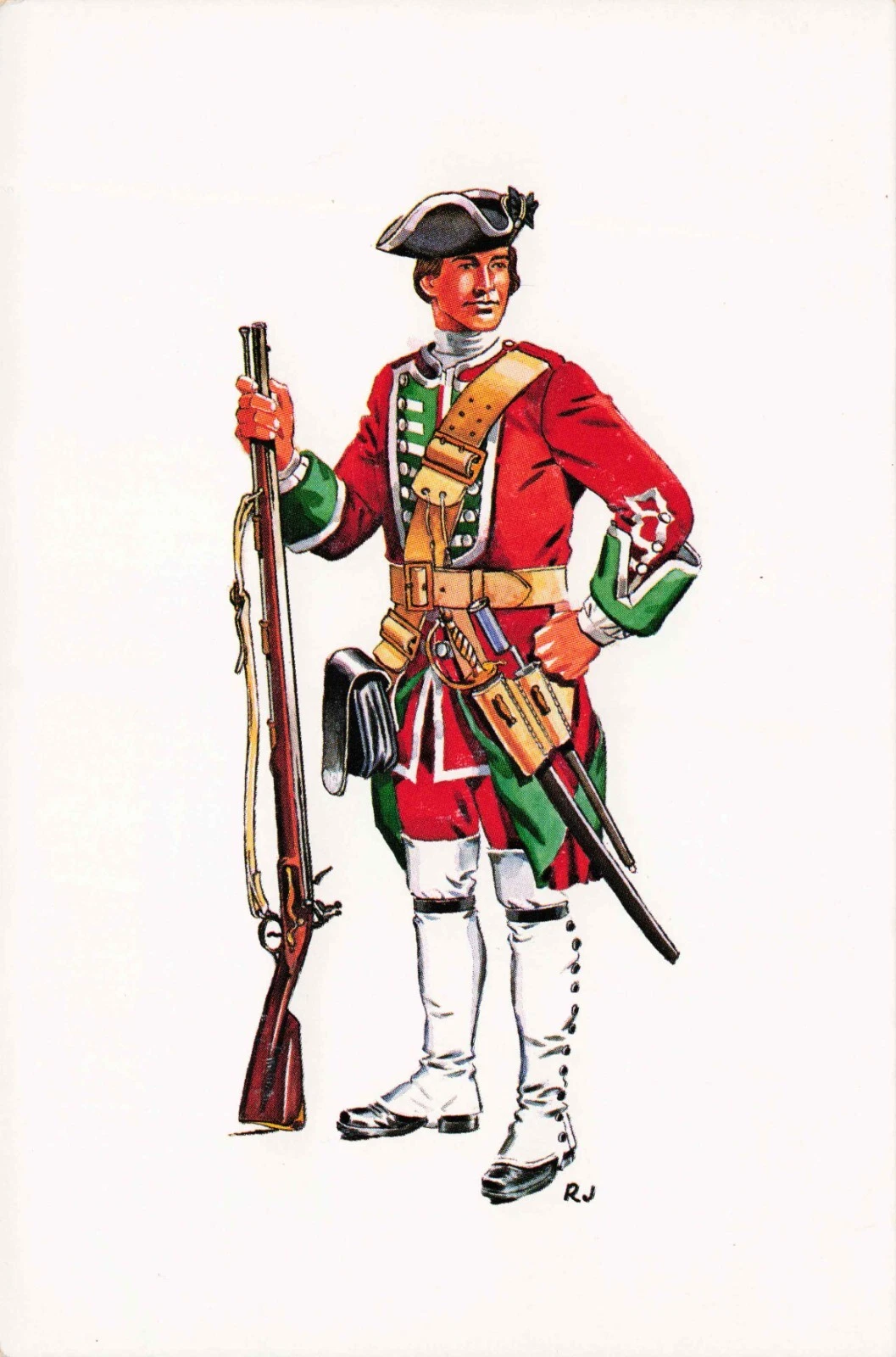
- Illustration of a regimental private
- Active: August 1737 – 24 November 1748
- Allegiance: Great Britain
- Branch: British Army
- Type: Infantry
- Role: Line infantry
- Size: Seven companies
- Engagements: War of Jenkins' Ear; Siege of St. Augustine (1740); Battle of Bloody Marsh; Battle of Gully Hole Creek

Commanders
- Colonel of the Regiment: James Oglethorpe

James Oglethorpe's Regiment of Foot, ranked as the 42nd Regiment of Foot and known simply as Oglethorpe's Regiment, was a line infantry regiment of the British Army. Raised by the governor of Georgia James Oglethorpe in August 1737, the regiment comprised six line companies and one grenadier company and saw service in the War of Jenkins' Ear in the Province of Georgia and Spanish Florida. Seeing action at the siege of St. Augustine and the battles of Bloody Marsh and Gully Hole Creek, the regiment was disbanded on 24 November 1748 following the end of the War of Jenkins' Ear as a result of the signing of the Treaty of Aix-la-Chapelle.

== Service ==
The raising of the regiment, ranked as the 42nd Regiment of Foot, was authorised in August 1737. The regiment was raised at Savannah in 1738. The regiment took part in the Siege of St Augustine in June and July 1740 and the Battles of Bloody Marsh and Gully Hole Creek near Fort Frederica in July 1742. The regiment was disbanded at the end of the conflict on 24 November 1748. Some of its discharged soldiers enlisted in the British Army independent companies in South Carolina.

== Organisation ==
When raised the regiment comprised six line companies of 100 privates each along with several non-commissioned officers and drummers; a grenadier company was eventually added to the regiment. Oglethorpe secured officer's commissions in the regiment for colonial gentlemen of good character and social standing, and selected 20 young gentlemen with no personal wealth to serve as regimental cadets.

== Officers ==
Officers included:

- James Oglethorpe, Colonel
- James Cochran, Lieutenant-Colonel
- William Cook, Major
- Hugh Mackay, Captain
- Richard Norbury, Captain
- Alexander Herron, Captain
- Albert Desbrisay, Captain
- Philip Delegall, Sr., Lieutenant
- Philip Delegall, Jr., Lieutenant
- Raymond Demere, Lieutenant
- George Morgan, rank not stated
- George Dunbar, rank not stated
- William Horton, Ensign
- James Mackay, Ensign
- William Folsom, Ensign
- John Tanner, Ensign
- John Leman, Ensign
- Sandford Mace, Ensign
- Hugh Mackay, Adjutant
- Edward Dyson, Clerk and Chaplain
- Thomas Hawkins, Surgeon
- Edward Wansall, Quartermaster

Lachlan McIntosh served as a cadet in the regiment.
