= Siege of St. Augustine (1740) =

Battle during the War of Jenkin's Ear

Coordinates: 29.8977°N 81.3113°W

- Part of the War of Jenkins' Ear
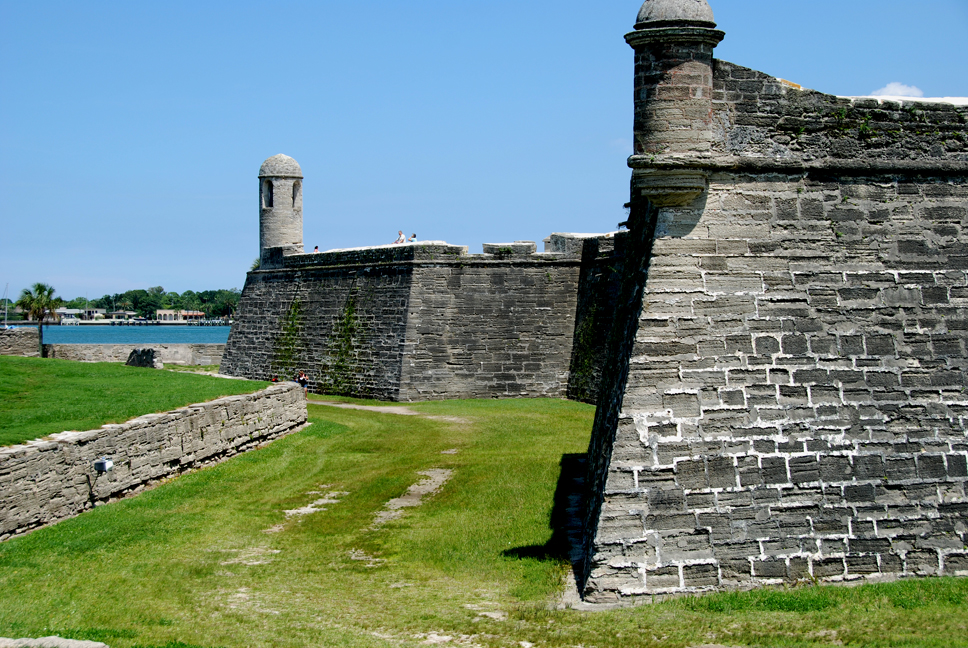
- Castillo de San Marcos
Date	13 June–20 July 1740
Location	St. Augustine, Spanish Florida
Result	Spanish victory

Belligerents
Great Britain	Spain

Commanders and leaders
James Oglethorpe; Ahaya Secoffee; Pearce	Manuel de Montiano

Strength
1,000 infantry (Oglethorpe's Regiment, Georgia Provincials, South Carolina Provincials.); 900 sailors 1,200 warriors 56 cannons 5 frigates 3 sloops	750 infantry 50 cannons 1 fort 6 small ships

Casualties and losses
122 killed 16 captured 14 deserted 56 artillery pieces captured 1 schooner captured	Unknown

The siege of St. Augustine was a military engagement that took place during June–July 1740. It involved a British attack on the city of St. Augustine in Spanish Florida and was a part of the much larger conflict known as the War of Jenkins' Ear.

== Background ==
In September 1739, King George II sent orders to Governor James Oglethorpe of the colony of Georgia "to annoy the Subjects of Spain in the best manner" possible. To pursue these orders, Oglethorpe encouraged his Creek allies to begin attacking Spaniards and Florida Indians. On November 13, a group of Spaniards landed on Amelia Island and killed two British soldiers. In response, Oglethorpe began a punitive campaign with a mixed force of British regulars (the 42nd Regiment of Foot), colonial militia from the Province of Georgia and the Carolinas, and Native American Creek, Chickasaw, Shawnee and Uchees. The campaign began in December 1739, and by January Oglethorpe was raiding Spanish forts west of St. Augustine. In May 1740, Oglethorpe undertook an expedition to capture St. Augustine itself. In support of that objective, Oglethorpe first captured Fort San Diego, Fort Picolotta, Fort San Francisco de Pupo, and Fort Mose, the first free black settlement in America.

== Siege ==
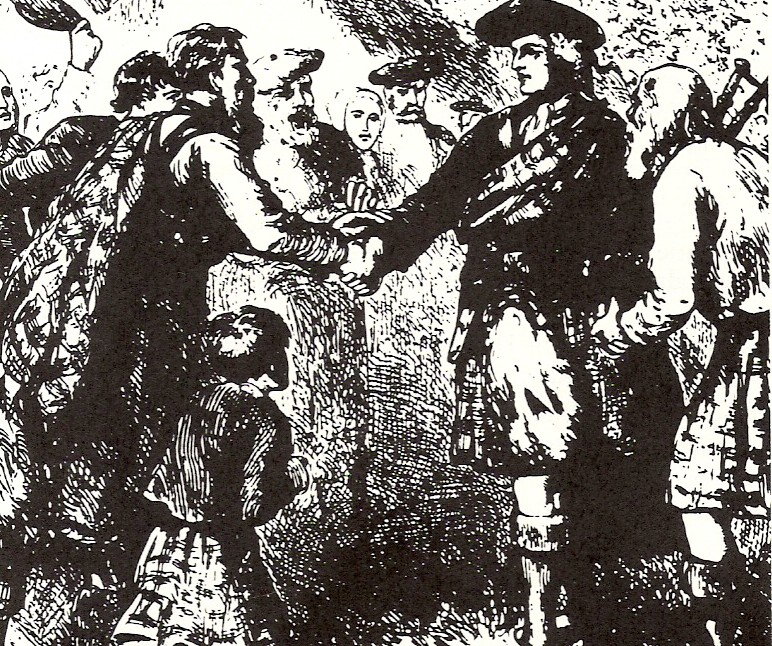
Oglethorpe Greeting the Highlanders of Darien, the 42nd Regiment of Foot (old)

Oglethorpe deployed his batteries on the island of Santa Anastasia while a British naval squadron blockaded the port. On 24 June Oglethorpe began a 27-day bombardment. On 26 June a sortie by 300 Spanish and free blacks attacked Fort Mose held by 120 Highlander Rangers and 30 Indians. In the Siege of Fort Mose, the garrison was taken by surprise with 68 killed and 34 captured while the Spanish loss was 10 killed.

The Spanish managed to send supply ships through the Royal Navy blockade and any hope of starving St. Augustine into capitulation was lost. Oglethorpe now planned to storm the fortress by land while the navy ships attacked the Spanish ships and half-galleys in the harbor. Commodore Pearce, however resolved to forgo the attack during hurricane season. Oglethorpe gave up the siege and returned to Georgia; abandoning his artillery during his withdrawal.

== See also ==
- Battle of Bloody Marsh
- Battle of Gully Hole Creek
- Battle of Cartagena de Indias
- Invasion of Georgia (1742)
- Robert Jenkins (master mariner)
- The Oglethorpe Plan
