= Jane Landers =

Historian

Jane Gilmer Landers (born January 1, 1947) is an historian of colonial Latin America and the Atlantic World who specializes in the history of Africans and their descendants. She is the Gertrude Conaway Vanderbilt Professor of History at Vanderbilt University, director of the Center for Latin American and Iberian Studies, and former associate dean of the college of arts & science.

== Early life and education ==
Landers was born in Pittsburgh and raised in the Dominican Republic, where her father was a naval officer attached to the United States diplomatic mission at Santo Domingo.

In 1968 Landers graduated cum laude from the University of Miami with a Bachelor of Arts degree in Hispanic American Studies, and in 1974 earned a Master of Arts there in Inter-American Studies. In 1988 she obtained her PhD in Latin American Colonial History at the University of Florida.

== Career ==
From 1988 to 1991, she taught as Adjunct Assistant Professor at the UF Department of History. In 1992 she moved to Vanderbilt University, where she taught in the department of history from 1992 to 1999 as assistant professor, from 1999 to 2010 as associate professor and since 2010 as professor. She has been Vanderbilt's Gertrude Conaway Professor of History since 2011. From 2000 to 2002, and again from 2011 to 2012, she served as the director of the University's Center for Latin American and Iberian Studies, and as associate dean of the University's College of Arts & Science from 2001 to 2004.

In 2001, Lander's monograph, Black Society in Spanish Florida, was awarded the Frances B. Simkins Prize for Distinguished First Book in Southern History by the Southern Historical Association. She is the author of Atlantic Creoles in the Age of Revolutions which won the Florida Historical Society's 2010 Rembert Patrick Book Award.

Landers is a member of the American Society for Ethnohistory, the American Historical Association, the Association of Caribbean Historians, the Brazilian Studies Association, the Conference on Latin American History, the Forum on European Expansion and Global Interaction, and the Southern Historical Association. She has been a member of UNESCO's International Scientific Committee of the Slave Route Project since 2015.

In 2013, Landers was named a Guggenheim Fellow and an American Council of Learned Societies Fellow; both fellowships were accompanied by grants to fund her project, "African Kingdoms, Black Republics, and Free Black Towns across the Iberian Atlantic".

While she was a graduate student doing research in the archives of Spanish Florida, Landers became aware of the existence of an early “underground railroad” of enslaved Africans who escaped bondage in the colony of Carolina to find refuge in Spanish Florida. In 1738, these runaways settled at Gracia Real de Santa Teresa de Mose, a town established by Governor Manuel de Montiano for free blacks. She had planned to do research in Brazilian history, but coming across records of the role blacks played in the history of Spain's New World possessions pointed her research in a new direction and changed the course of her career. She continued her research in Spain, then followed the documentary trail of the Mose settlers who had evacuated to Cuba with the Spanish Floridanos when Great Britain acquired Florida in 1763. She found many of them in 18th-century Catholic parish registers of Havana, Matanzas, Regla, Guanabacoa and San Miguel del Padrón. These records, along with many others, are preserved digitally in the Slave Societies Digital Archive (formerly Ecclesiastical and Secular Sources for Slave Societies), which she founded in 2003; it now holds approximately 600,000 images dating from the 16th to the 19th centuries.

== Selected works ==
=== Books ===
- Against the Odds: Free Blacks in the Slave Societies of the Americas. Psychology Press. 1996. ISBN 978-0-7146-4710-4.
- Atlantic Creoles in the Age of Revolutions. Harvard University Press. February 2010. ISBN 978-0-674-03591-1.
- Black Society in Spanish Florida. University of Illinois Press. 1999. ISBN 978-0-252-06753-2.
- Colonial Plantations and Economy in Florida. University Press of Florida. 2000. ISBN 978-0-8130-1772-3.
- Slaves, Subjects, and Subversives: Blacks in Colonial Latin America. UNM Press. 2006. ISBN 978-0-8263-2397-2.
- David R. Colburn; Jane Landers (1995). The African American Heritage of Florida. University Press of Florida. ISBN 978-0-8130-1412-8.
- Douglas R. Egerton; Alison Games; Jane G. Landers; Kris Lane; Donald R. Wright (20 March 2007). The Atlantic World: A History, 1400–1888. Wiley. ISBN 978-0-88295-245-1.
