= List of people from the London Borough of Havering =

Among those who were born in the London Borough of Havering, or have dwelt within the borders of the modern borough are (alphabetical order):

== A ==
- Tony Adams – ex-Arsenal footballer, born in Romford
- Andy C – drum and bass DJ and pioneer of the scene

== B ==
- Kylie Babbington – EastEnders actress
- Adrian Baker – musician
- Kenny Ball – jazz trumpeter and band leader; lived in Ardleigh Green, Hornchurch
- Gerard Batten – former leader of the United Kingdom Independence Party
- John Benn and William Wedgwood Benn – family of politicians, lived at Upminster in the 19th century
- Robert Bertie, 3rd Earl of Lindsey – leased Havering Palace
- Pauline Black – singer, actress and author; lead singer of ska band The Selecter
- Teddy Bourne (born 1948) – British Olympic épée fencer
- Frankie Bridge – singer; currently one of The Saturdays; previously a member of S Club Juniors
- Frank Bruno – boxer; has lived in Havering
- Will Burnell – English cricketer

== C ==
- Dean-Charles Chapman – actor, born in Romford
- Stephen Charles – cricketer
- Joe Cole – West Ham footballer, grew up in Romford
- Anthony Cooke – of Gidea Hall, tutor to Edward VI
- Jilly Cooper – novelist, born in Romford

== D ==
- Alex Day – YouTuber and singer
- Harlee Dean – professional footballer, currently plays for Brentford; grew up in North Ockendon, attended Hall Mead School, Upminster
- Richard Deane – regicide of Charles I, tenant at Havering-atte-Bower
- William Derham – rector at Upminster, fellow of the Royal Society
- Ian Dury – rock and roll singer, lived in Upminster as a child

== E ==
- Edward the Confessor – used Havering Palace as a retreat
- James Esdaile – lived in Upminster, lord mayor of London (1777–1778)

== F ==
- Ken Farnes – cricketer, brought up at Gidea Park
- Five Star – Denise, Lorraine, Doris, Stedman and Delroy Pearson, siblings who made up the pop group who were hugely successful in the mid-late 1980s; from Romford

== G ==
- Augustine Garland – regicide of Charles I, owned an estate at Hornchurch
- Jimmy Greaves – footballer; once lived in Upminster

== H ==
- Thomas Hammond – army officer involved in the regicide of Charles I, tenant at Havering-atte-Bower
- Spencer Hawken – filmmaker and former GMTV presenter
- Imogen Heap – musician; grew up in Havering Village
- Carly Hillman – actress and singer, played Nicky Di Marco in BBC soap EastEnders and member of girl-band Urban Lady
- Rochelle Humes – former member of S Club Juniors; current member of The Saturdays; television presenter of This Morning and The Xtra Factor
- Daniel Huttlestone – actor, played Gavroche in the 2012 film Les Misérables
- Karl Hyde – musician and member of Underworld, born in Bewdley but has lived in the borough for many years

== J ==
- James I of England and VI of Scotland – used Havering Palace as a hunting lodge
- Alex Jennings – actor, born in Romford
- Ralph Josselin – curate and diarist, lived briefly at Cranham Hall in 1640

== K ==
- Elizabeth Kucinich – peace activist and wife of a U.S. congressman; brought up in North Ockendon

== L ==
- Freddie Ladapo (born 1993) – footballer currently playing for Rotherham United
- Frank James Lampard (born 1978) – English footballer and manager who played for West Ham United, Swansea City, Chelsea, Manchester City, New York City, and at international level for the England national team
- Harry Lennon – professional footballer, grew up in Romford
- Thomas Littleton – of North Ockendon, speaker of the House of Commons (1698–1700)
- Colin Lynes – former IBO world title boxer
- Andrew Lynford – actor and TV presenter; grew up in Upminster and Hornchurch

== M ==
- Ruby Mace – footballer, born in Upminster
- Richard Madeley – TV presenter, born in Romford
- Jennifer Maidman – musician, songwriter and record producer, born in Upminster
- Millicent Martin – actor, singer, comedian; born in Romford
- Zara McDermott – Love Island contestant
- Kevin Mitchell – boxer; born in Romford
- Richard Morris – philologist, lived in Hornchurch

== N ==
- Jesy Nelson – former member of Little Mix, 2011 winners of The X Factor
- Charlotte Nichols (born 1991), member of UK parliament for Warrington North since 2019 representing the Labour Party
- Mike Nolan – member of Bucks Fizz, winners of the 1981 Eurovision Song Contest, grew up in Rainham

== O ==
- Billy Ocean – singer
- James Oglethorpe – married the heiress of Cranham Hall in 1743; founded the Province of Georgia, United States, and was buried in All Saints' Church, Cranham
- Martin Olley – cricketer
- Jo O'Meara – singer
- Will Ospreay – professional wrestler currently signed with All Elite Wrestling

== P ==
- Ray Parlour – former footballer
- Tony Parsons – author and journalist; born and grew up in Romford
- Alice Perrers – mistress of Edward III, lived and buried at Upminster

== R ==
- Robert Rollins – cricketer for Essex Cricket Club

== S ==
- Paul Sculfor – model; brought up in Cranham
- Seal – fostered in Romford from shortly after birth until age 4
- Freddie Sears – footballer currently playing for Ipswich Town
- Matthew Selt – snooker player
- Jonjo Shelvey – footballer currently playing for Nottingham Forest

== T ==
- Stuart Taylor – former footballer
- Lisa Thompson – children's author
- Russell Tovey – actor

== U ==
- Underworld – musicians, resident in Romford
- Edward Upward (1903–2009) – novelist, born in Romford

== W ==
- Ken Wallace (born 1936) – Essex cricketer
- Micheal Ward – actor; born in Spain, moved to Romford
- Major Sir Tasker Watkins – Victoria Cross recipient, educated in Romford
- Cliff Williams (born 1949) – AC/DC bass player, born in Romford
- Evelyn Wood – British Army officer and recipient of the Victoria Cross, rented property at Upminster
