= Cranham Hall =

House in the London Borough of Havering, England

Coordinates: 51.5519°N 0.2666°E

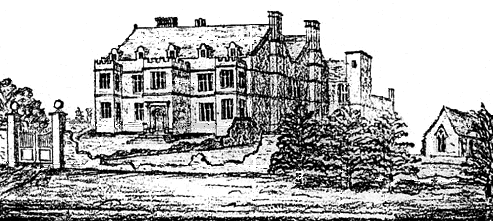
Sketch of Cranham Hall by John Pridden in 1789, prior to rebuilding

Cranham Hall is a Grade II listed building in Cranham, London, England.

Built c.1795, it forms a typical Essex church-manor house complex, standing on the ridge in the south of the former parish of Cranham. Its predecessor, of red brick, c.1600 was occupied by Revd Sir Edward Petre of Cranham Hall (the 3rd Baronet, and confessor to James II), and later by James Oglethorpe. Much of its garden wall survives, and appears to be in the same red brick. The Elizabethan hall stood east of the half-H plan timber hall. The latter appears to be 14th/15th century, and a 17th-century map, glimpses of it in Miss Boyd's sketches and at least one sketch of the 18th century hall, suggest it survived into the 19th century. If it is 14th / 15th century then at least one more predecessor building, at the head of the Domesday manor of Wokydon (episcopi) can be inferred.

== See also ==
- Petre baronets
