= Thomas Bambridge =

British attorney and prison warden (d. 1741)

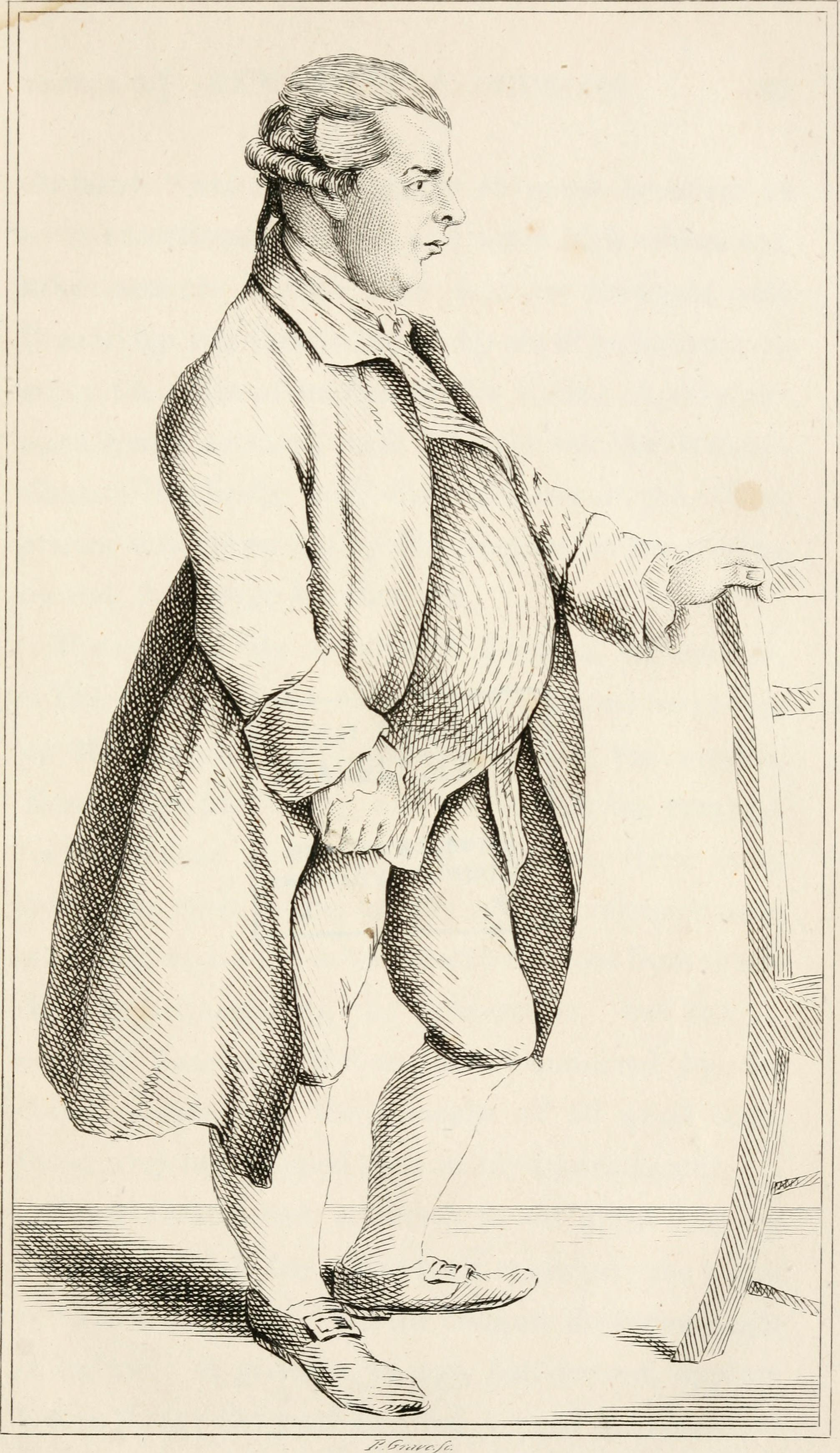
- Died: 1741 (in Julian calendar)
- Occupation: Prison warden

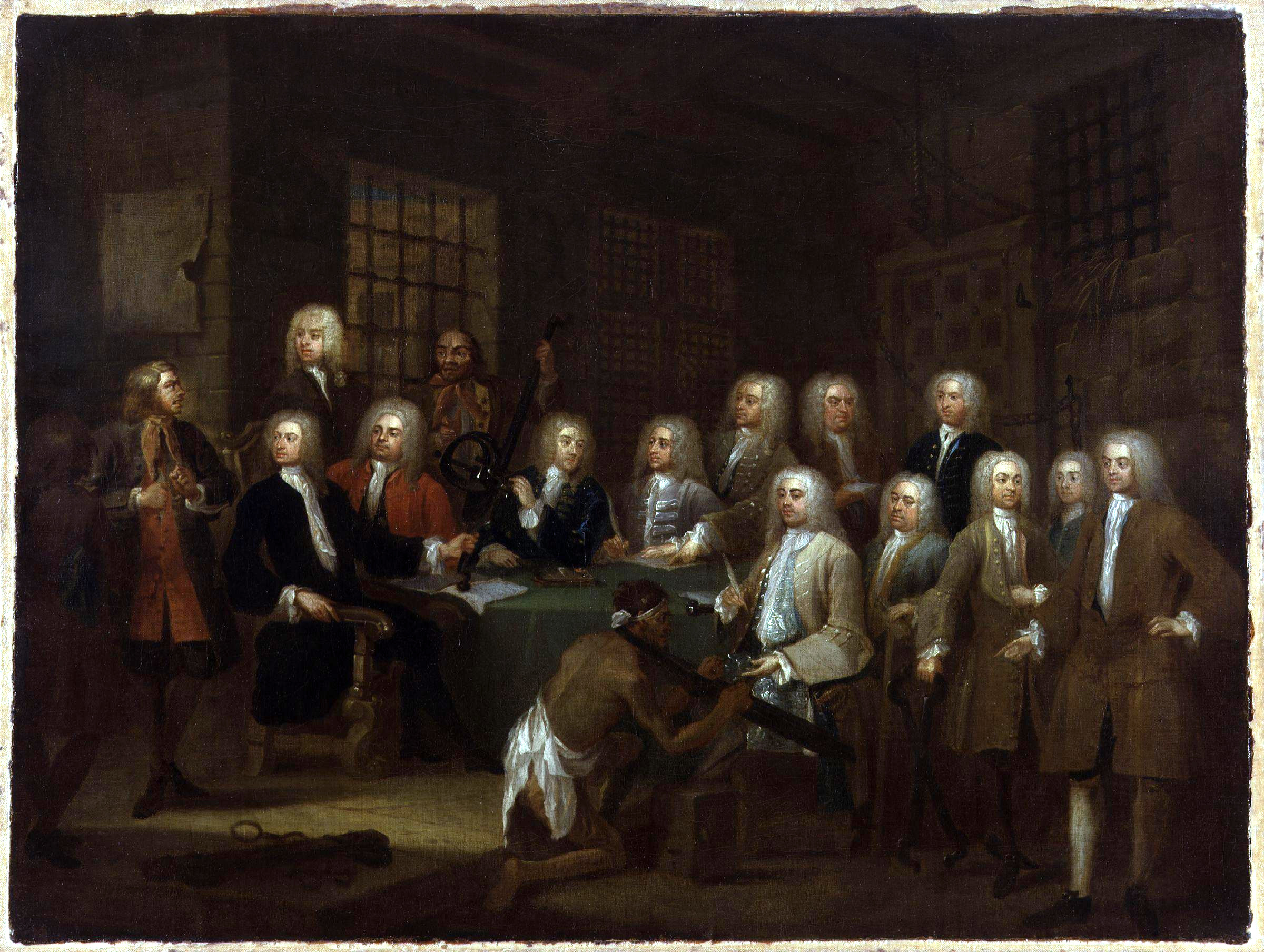
Thomas Bambridge (standing, far left) being questioned by James Oglethorpe (believed to be the figure seated, far left, in front of Bainbridge) of the parliamentary Gaols Committee, which visited the Fleet on 27 February 1729. Sir Archibald Grant (standing third from the right) commissioned this painting from William Hogarth, who sketched it when he accompanied the committee on the visit, later painting it in oil.

Thomas Bambridge (died 1741) was a British attorney who became a notorious warden of the Fleet Prison in London.

Bambridge became warden of the Fleet in 1728. He had paid, with another person, £5,000 to John Huggins for the wardenship. He was found guilty of extortion, and, according to a committee of the House of Commons appointed to inquire into the state of English gaols, arbitrarily and unlawfully loaded with irons, put into dungeons, and destroyed prisoners for debt, treating them in the most barbarous and cruel manner, in violation of the law. He was committed to Newgate Prison, and an act, Warden of Fleet Prison Act 1728 (2 Geo. 2. c. 32) was passed to prevent his enjoying the office of warden.
