= Cranham =

Residential area of East London, England

Coordinates: 51.561978°N 0.268006°E

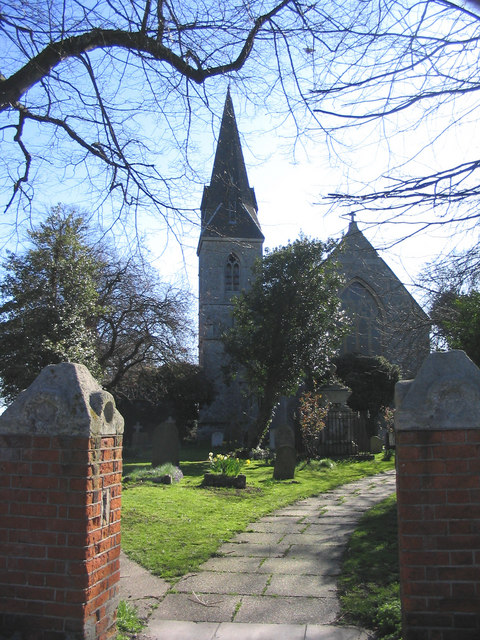
- All Saints' Church, Cranham

- Location within Greater London
- OS grid reference: TQ575875
  - Charing Cross: 17.5 mi (28.2 km) WSW
- London borough: Havering
- Ceremonial county: Greater London
- Region: London
- Country: England
- Sovereign state: United Kingdom
- Post town: UPMINSTER
- Postcode district: RM14
- Dialling code: 01708
- Police: Metropolitan
- Fire: London
- Ambulance: London
- UK Parliament: Hornchurch and Upminster
- London Assembly: Havering and Redbridge

Cranham is a residential area of east London, and part of the London Borough of Havering. It is located 17.5 miles (28 km) east-northeast of Charing Cross and comprises an extensive built-up area to the north and a low density conservation area to the south surrounded by open land. It was historically a rural village in the county of Essex and formed an ancient parish. It is peripheral to London, forming the eastern edge of the urban sprawl. The economic history of Cranham is characterised by a shift from agriculture to housing development. As part of the suburban growth of London in the 20th century, Cranham significantly increased in population, becoming part of Hornchurch Urban District in 1934 and has formed part of Greater London since 1965. The 2011 Census population of Cranham was included in Upminster.

== History ==
=== Toponymy ===
Cranham (parish) population
1881	416
1891	465
1901	397
1911	489
1921	519
1931	1,240
1941	war #
1951	2,836
# no census was held due to war
source: UK census

Cranham is recorded in the Domesday Book of 1086 as comprising two manors. The smaller was in the north of the parish, and called Craohv and in 1201 as Craweno. It means 'spur of land frequented by crows' and is formed from the Old English 'crāwe' and 'hōh'. The larger was the Anglo-Saxon manor of Ockendon (Wochenduna) During the Middle Ages, and until around the 15th century, it was also known as Bishop's Ockendon because a large part of its area was owned by the Bishop of London.

=== Economic development ===
The parish is recorded in 1086 as being heavily wooded, supporting an agrarian way of life. Forest clearance was well advanced by the 15th century, with an increase in population and arable land; and there was a mill in Cranham. Cranham lay on brick earth and this gave rise to the Cranham Brick and Tile Company which was in operation from 1900 to 1920. Drury has suggested that early trade was with the nearby settlements of Romford and Hornchurch and with London via the River Thames at Rainham.

=== Local government ===
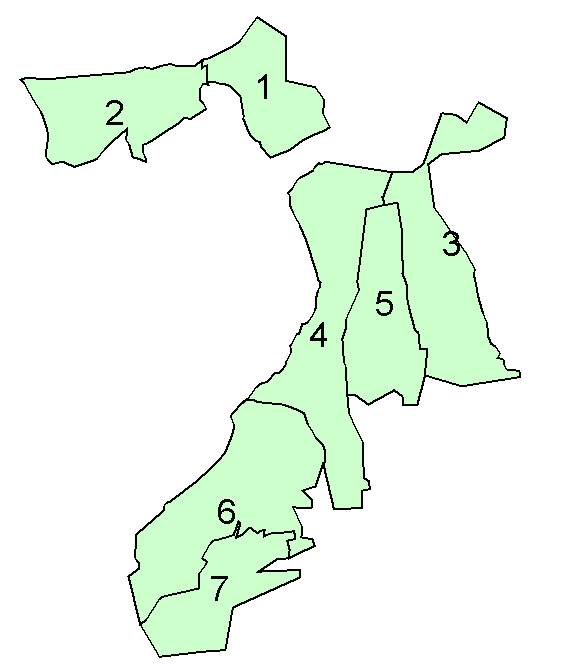
1931: Cranham (5) within Romford Rural District, adjoining Upminster (4) and Great Warley (3)

Cranham formed an ancient parish of 1,879 acres (7.60 km^{2}) in the Chafford hundred of Essex. The vestry met in the church until 1829 and then at the parish workhouse. In 1836 the parish was grouped for poor relief into the Romford Poor Law Union and for sanitary provision in 1875 into Romford rural sanitary district. The sanitary district became Romford Rural District from 1894 and a parish council was formed to replace the vestry.

The parish formed part of the London Traffic Area from 1924 and the London Passenger Transport Area from 1933. To reflect the significantly increased population in the area, Romford Rural District was abolished in 1934 and Cranham was amalgamated with neighbouring parishes into Hornchurch Urban District. The parish council was abolished and Hornchurch Urban District Council became the local authority. There was a revision of boundaries with North Ockendon, which had been part of Orsett Rural District, absorbed into Cranham and a small area to the north, near Great Warley, transferred to Brentwood Urban District.

On 1 April 1965 Cranham parish and Hornchurch Urban District was abolished and its former area was transferred from Essex to Greater London, to be combined with that of the Municipal Borough of Romford in order to form the present-day London Borough of Havering. At the 1951 census (one of the last before the abolition of the parish), Cranham had a population of 2836. In 1993 the Greater London boundary, to the east of Cranham and north of the railway line, was locally realigned to the M25 motorway, returning some mostly unpopulated areas of open land to Essex and leaving North Ockendon as the only part of Greater London outside the bounds of the motorway.

=== Urban development ===
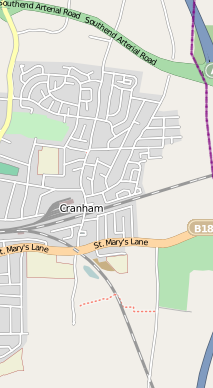
Map of Cranham

In the 17th and 18th centuries manorial homes, including Cranham Hall, became attractive properties for merchants from the City of London. Initial attempts to expand the suburban estates from Upminster in the early 20th century ran into problems because of the lack of water supply. In 1922 sewage works for Upminster and Cranham were opened in Great Warley. In the 1930s land was used to develop some council housing and following the sale of the Benyon estate the pace of new building quickened. Cranham's location on the very edge of London's urban sprawl is explained by the halting effect on suburban house building of the introduction of the Metropolitan Green Belt and World War II. Thereafter building took place within the area bounded by the Southend Arterial Road in the north and St Mary's Lane in the south; and there were 615 council houses built by 1971.

== Governance ==
Cranham forms part of the Hornchurch and Upminster UK Parliament constituency, and is partly within the Havering wards of Upminster and Cranham. Together these form the Upminster Area Committee. The current MP is Julia Lopez. Each ward elects three councillors to Havering London Borough Council. All six councillors elected in 2010 for the two wards were the Upminster and Cranham Residents' Association candidates and the area is unusual in that the residents' association is strongly active. From 1945 to 1974 Cranham formed part of the Hornchurch constituency and from 1974 to 2010 it formed part of the Upminster constituency. Cranham is within the Havering and Redbridge London Assembly constituency.

== Geography ==
Most of Cranham is located on the London Clay belt, with loam to the north and a gravel valley to the south. It rises to about 250 feet (76 m) in the north and to below 50 feet (15 m) in the south; with a ridge running east to west upon which All Saints' Church is located. Cranham forms a continuously built-up area with Upminster to the west, with open fields separating it from Harold Wood in the north, Great Warley to the east and North Ockendon to the southeast. Franks Wood and Cranham Brickfields are designated a Site of Importance for Nature Conservation with a habitat of ancient woodland, coppices, ditches, scrub, tall herbs and neutral grassland. The community forest centre for the extensive Thames Chase is located in the open land to the south east. Cranham forms part of the Upminster post town in the RM14 postcode district. Climate data for Cranham is taken from the nearest weather station at Greenwich, around 12 miles (19.3 km) southwest of All Saints church:

Climate data for Greenwich Park, elevation: 47 m (154 ft), 1991–2020 normals, extremes 1948–2004
Month	Jan	Feb	Mar	Apr	May	Jun	Jul	Aug	Sep	Oct	Nov	Dec	Year
Record high °C (°F)	16.8 (62.2)	19.7 (67.5)	23.3 (73.9)	25.3 (77.5)	29.0 (84.2)	34.5 (94.1)	35.3 (95.5)	37.5 (99.5)	30.2 (86.4)	26.1 (79.0)	18.9 (66.0)	16.4 (61.5)	37.5 (99.5)
Mean daily maximum °C (°F)	8.5 (47.3)	9.2 (48.6)	12.1 (53.8)	15.4 (59.7)	18.6 (65.5)	21.4 (70.5)	23.8 (74.8)	23.3 (73.9)	20.3 (68.5)	15.8 (60.4)	11.6 (52.9)	8.9 (48.0)	15.8 (60.4)
Daily mean °C (°F)	5.9 (42.6)	6.2 (43.2)	8.4 (47.1)	10.7 (51.3)	13.8 (56.8)	16.7 (62.1)	18.8 (65.8)	18.7 (65.7)	15.9 (60.6)	12.4 (54.3)	8.8 (47.8)	6.3 (43.3)	11.9 (53.4)
Mean daily minimum °C (°F)	3.4 (38.1)	3.2 (37.8)	4.7 (40.5)	6.0 (42.8)	9.1 (48.4)	12.0 (53.6)	13.9 (57.0)	14.1 (57.4)	11.6 (52.9)	9.0 (48.2)	6.1 (43.0)	3.8 (38.8)	8.1 (46.6)
Record low °C (°F)	−12.7 (9.1)	−9.4 (15.1)	−6.7 (19.9)	−4.8 (23.4)	−1.0 (30.2)	1.1 (34.0)	5.0 (41.0)	5.3 (41.5)	1.1 (34.0)	−2.1 (28.2)	−8.0 (17.6)	−10.5 (13.1)	−12.7 (9.1)
Average precipitation mm (inches)	43.9 (1.73)	39.9 (1.57)	36.5 (1.44)	38.6 (1.52)	44.0 (1.73)	49.3 (1.94)	36.3 (1.43)	53.0 (2.09)	52.4 (2.06)	58.3 (2.30)	59.9 (2.36)	50.7 (2.00)	562.9 (22.16)
Average precipitation days (≥ 1.0 mm)	10.5	9.2	7.9	8.1	7.9	7.8	7.1	8.2	7.9	10.3	10.6	10.2	105.6
Mean monthly sunshine hours	44.4	66.1	109.7	152.9	198.7	198.6	209.2	198.0	140.6	99.7	58.5	50.1	1,526.4
Source 1: Met Office
Source 2: Starlings Roost Weather

== Demography ==
Cranham compared (2001 Census)
Statistic	Upminster	Cranham	Havering	London	England
Ethnic group
White	12,354	11,930	213,421	5,103,203	44,679,361
Asian	133	120	4,088	866,693	2,248,289
Black	59	64	3,139	782,849	1,132,508
Mixed	87	78	2,298	226,111	643,373
Chinese/Other	41	19	827	70,928	231,424
Population
Total	12,674	12,242	224,248	7,172,091	49,138,831
Density(/hectare)	5.62	18.67	19.97	45.62	3.77
Households	4,946	5,111	91,722	3,015,997	20,451,427

Demographic data is produced by the Office for National Statistics for the wards of Cranham and Upminster. All of Cranham is contained within these wards, however they also cover the connected settlement of Upminster and the rural outlier of North Ockendon. In 2001 the population of Upminster ward was 12,674 and Cranham ward was 12,242, giving a total population of 25,098. 80.95% in Upminster and 81.73% in Cranham report their religion as Christian, compared to 76.13% for Havering, 58.23% in London and 71.74% in England. 10.08% in Upminster and 10.46% in Cranham report having no religion, compared to 13.18% in Havering, 15.76% in London and 14.59% in England. With a black and minority ethnic population of 3% in 2001, Cranham and Upminster wards have the lowest Simpson index for ethnic diversity in London. The level of home ownership is atypically high compared to the rest of London and England, with over 90% of housing tenure under owner-occupation in both wards.

== Economy ==
There are several short parades of shops; the largest on Front Lane, dominated by a Tesco Express store. The nearest significant activity centre identified in the London Plan is the local district centre at Upminster. Within Havering, Upminster is identified as the nearest of seven main town centres. There are a number of commercial businesses centred around the A127 Southend Arterial Road including a wholesale butcher, mushroom cultivator, caravan sales, and a sports equipment supplier. There are a limited number of hospitality venues, including pubs and a popular tandoori restaurant.

== Transport ==
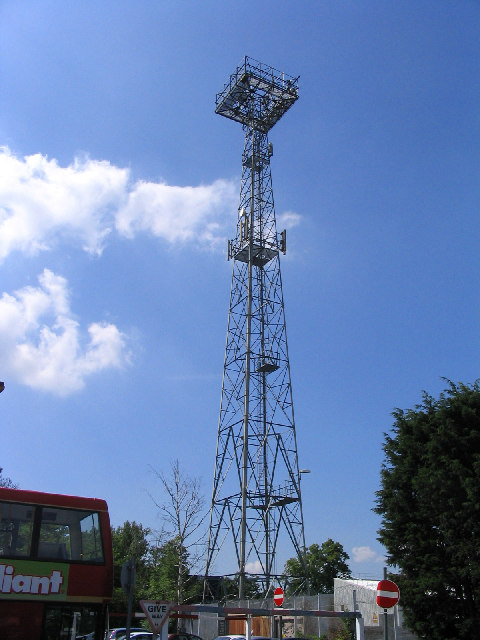
Two floodlight towers in the London Underground depot are the tallest structures in Cranham

Front Lane is the main road through Cranham and runs north to south, connecting with the A127 road in the north. Approximately 0.5 miles (0.80 km) to the northeast it has a junction with the M25 motorway, which forms the outer ring road of London. Cranham is the location of the Upminster depot of the London Underground's District line. The nearest London Underground station is at Upminster, approximately 0.75 miles (1.21 km) to the west. The London-Tilbury-Southend line of the National Rail network passes through the area in two places, with the nearest station also at Upminster. There are Transport for London bus service to Upminster, Hornchurch and Romford on routes 248 and 346. NIBSbuses route 269 which goes from Brentwood to Grays also serves a very small portion of Cranham near the Havering and Brentwood border at Puddledock Farm.

== Culture ==
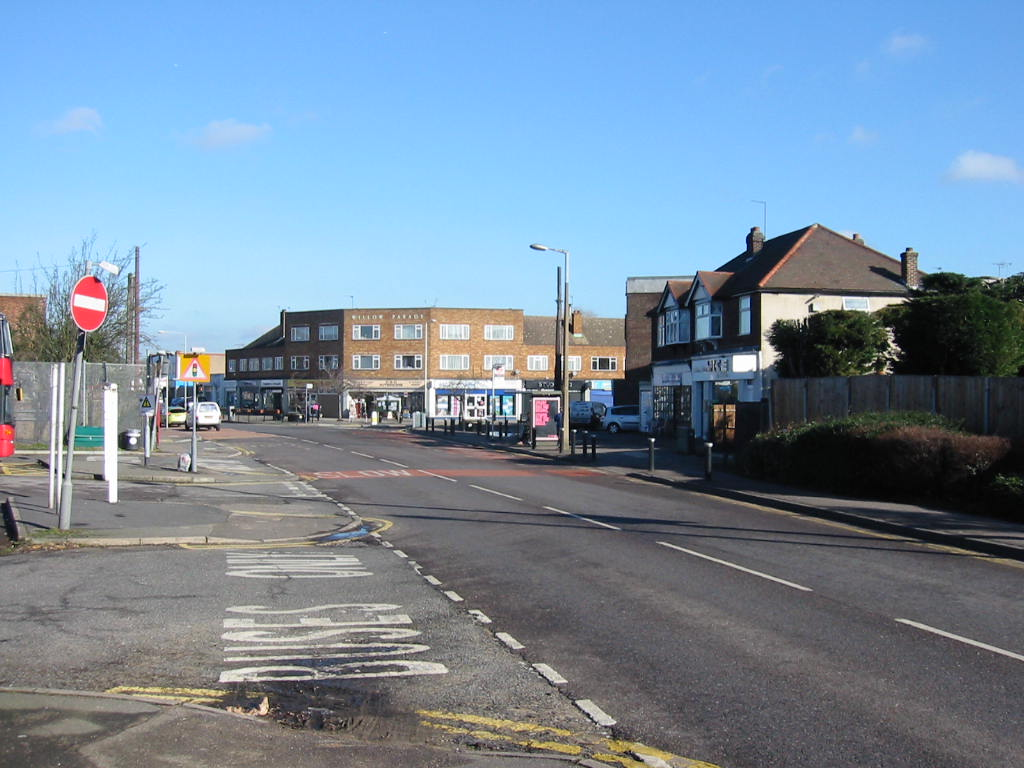
Willow Parade and shops on Front Lane

All Saints' Parish Church was rebuilt in 1873 and is a grade II listed building. James Oglethorpe, the founder of the state of Georgia, now part of the United States of America, is buried with his wife at the centre of its chancel. The area around the church forms a conservation area. There is a second church called St Luke's further north on Front Lane. Cranham Hall, the former manor house, is a grade II listed building. There are two community associations that are both registered charities. The Cranham Community Association operates a broad range of sporting, self-improvement and hobby activities at Cranham Community Centre on Marlborough Gardens. Cranham Social Hall, with a capacity of 100, is separately operated by the Front Lane Community Association, and provides a limited range of activities. The main cultural and entertainment facilities of the borough are located in Hornchurch and Romford.

== See also ==
- List of people from Havering
- List of schools in Havering
