= Cranham Brickfields =

Nature reserve in Greater London, England

Coordinates: 51.5656°N 0.27928°E

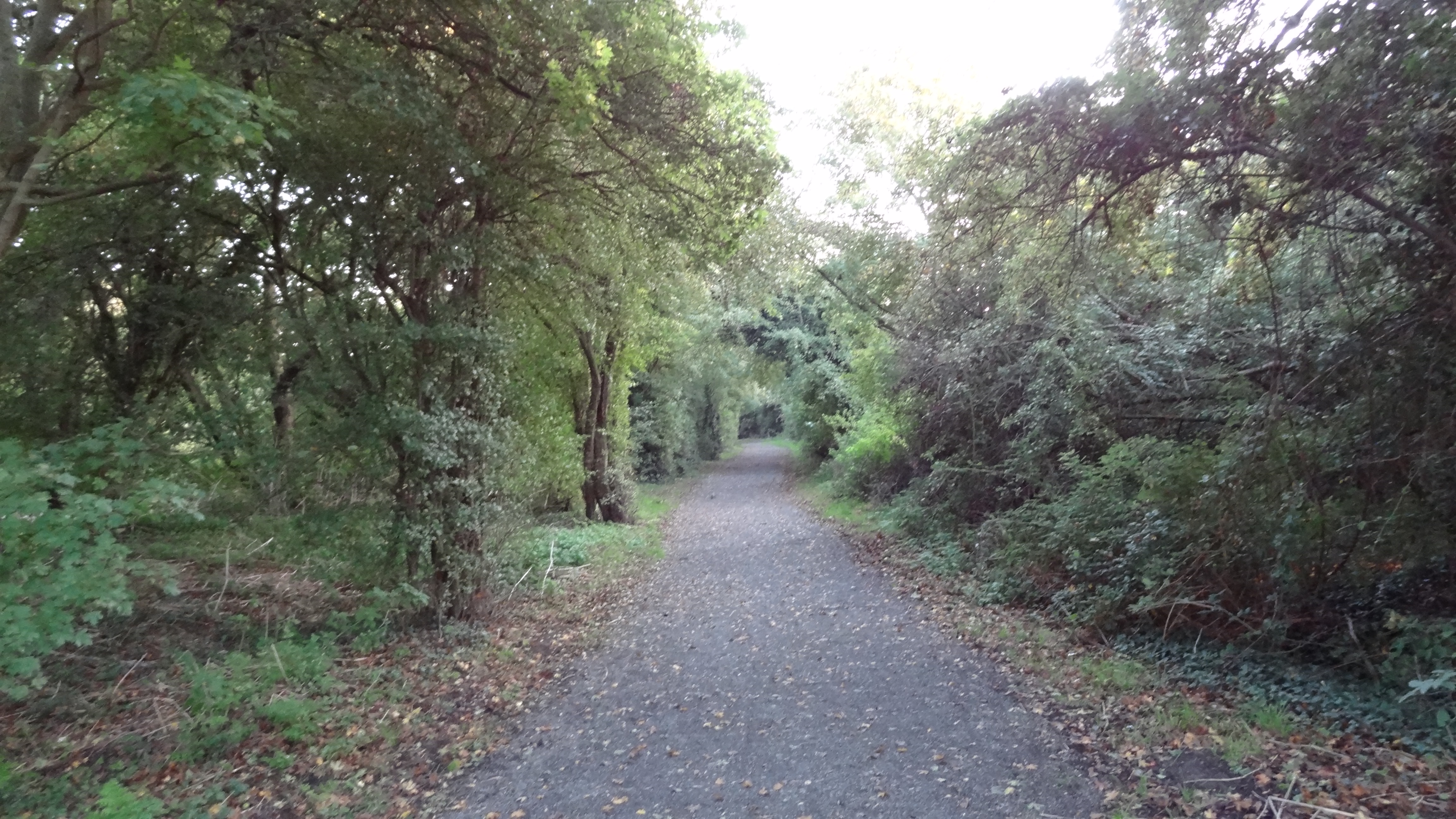
- Path through woodland
- Interactive map of Cranham Brickfields

Cranham Brickfields is an 8.5 hectare Local Nature Reserve and a Site of Borough Importance for Nature Conservation, Grade I, in Cranham in the London Borough of Havering. It has an area of woodland with a pond, wildflower meadows, and a grassed area with a playground. The site was formerly used for excavating clay to make bricks, and during the Second World War vegetables were cultivated as part of the Dig for Victory campaign. Wildlife includes bullfinches, great crested newts, stag beetles and green hairstreak butterflies. There is also dyer's greenweed, which is rare in London.

There is access from Sunnycroft Gardens and Limerick Gardens. The London, Tilbury and Southend line runs along the northern edge of the site, and a footpath under the railway leads to St Mary's Lane.
