= All Saints' Church, Cranham =

Coordinates: 51.552308°N 0.266133°E

All Saints'
- All Saints' Church
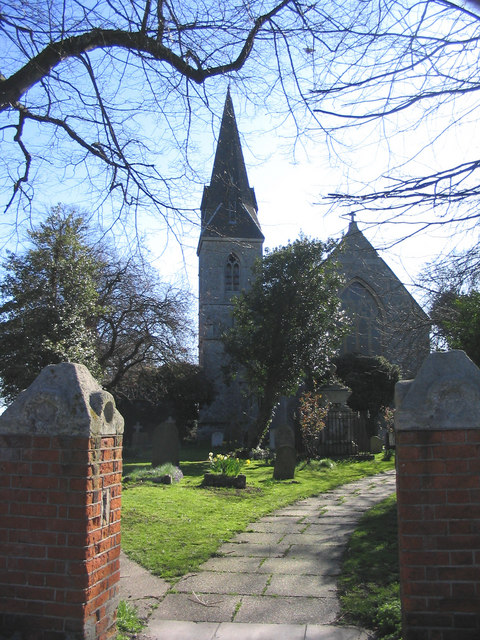
- Pictured in 2006
- All Saints'
- Location: Cranham
- Country: England
- Denomination: Church of England
- Website: https://allsaintschurchcranham.co.uk/

History
- Status: Parish Church

Architecture
- Heritage designation: Grade II listed building

All Saints' Church in Cranham, London, is a Grade II listed building.

James Oglethorpe, the founder of the state of Georgia, is buried with his wife at the centre of its chancel. The church was rebuilt c. 1871; however, the new church stands on the same foundations as the old one, and Oglethorpe's poetic marble memorial is on the south wall of the chancel, as before. In the 1930s, the president of Oglethorpe University, Thornwell Jacobs excavated the Oglethorpe family vault in the centre of the chancel at All Saints', although permission to translate the General's relics to a purpose-built shrine at Oglethorpe University (Atlanta) had been refused by the archdeacon.

== See also ==
- Grade II listed buildings in London
