= Midwinter (novel) =

1923 historical novel by John Buchan

- Author: John Buchan
- Genre: Historical novel
- Set in: England
- Publisher: Hodder & Stoughton
- Publication date: 1923
- Pages: 311

Midwinter: Certain travellers in old England is a 1923 historical novel by the Scottish author John Buchan. It is set during the Jacobite rising of 1745, when an army of Scottish highlanders seeking to place Charles Stuart onto the English throne advanced into England as far South as Derby. The Prince, otherwise known as "Bonnie Prince Charlie", the grandson of the ousted king James II, required men and money from English Jacobite sympathisers, and the novel imagines why those were not forthcoming from landowners in the Western counties and Wales. It purports to sheds light on Samuel Johnson's previously unknown activities during that period.

== Plot ==
The novel opens with a framing narrative telling of the discovery in a solicitor's office of an old manuscript that sheds light on Samuel Johnson's life in 1745–1746, a period that is missing from James Boswell's biography. The story itself is the supposed manuscript, fleshed out by the discoverer for publication.

Alastair Maclean, a Jacobite Scotsman who has been living in France with the exiled Stuarts, comes to England to join the Scottish army as it advances towards London. After rescuing a boy who is being beaten by a gamekeeper, he is by way of thanks himself helped by a man known as Midwinter, leader of the Spoonbills – a secret group of innkeepers and peasants of 'Old England'.

Maclean visits the home of the Jacobite sympathiser Lord Cornbury, seeking military aid for his cause, but Cornbury is cautious. Cornbury introduces him to the flamboyant Kitty, Duchess of Queensberry, and to her husband Lord Queensberry's agent, Nicholas Kyd, also said to be working covertly for the Stuart cause. Dinner is interrupted by the arrival of an exhausted rider from another estate, a shambling fellow called Samuel Johnson, previously tutor to Miss Claudia Grevel. Claudia has run away with the notorious young squire Sir John Norreys, apparently besotted with his Jacobite views, and Johnson beseeches Cornbury to ride after her. Cornbury cannot help, and Johnson rides off in pursuit himself.

Maclean seeks local intelligence in the West, but heads North when he is informed that the Prince has already crossed the border into England and is in desperate need of advice. The next day he is arrested as a Jacobite spy and taken to Squire Thicknesse. Thicknesse is the uncle of Claudia with whom she is lodging while Sir John – now her husband – travels North. Claudia's sympathies are with Maclean and she helps him escape. Maclean falls in love.

Betrayed by Claudia's faithless servant, Gypsy Ben, Maclean manages to avoid recapture with the help of the Spoonbills and Kyd's honest servant Edom Lowrie. From letters carried by Edom he discovers that Sir John Norreys has connections with Nicholas Kyd and appears suspiciously close to the Prince's inner circle for a young man with no connections. He learns that Norreys is heading to a strategic meeting place at Brightwell in Derbyshire. Uncertain whom to trust, Maclean confides in Midwinter who guides him to Brightwell, where he unexpectedly encounters Kyd. Claudia also travels there to be with her husband, along with Samuel Johnson.

Papers found in Kyd's saddle-bag clearly establish his and Norreys's betrayal. The pair, who have been ostensibly encouraging landowners to commit to the Jacobite cause, are actually in English pay. They have been passing on to the English government letters to the Prince promising men and money, hoping to gain part of the estates that will be forfeit to the Crown when the landowners' treason is revealed.

Maclean intends to kill Norreys, but is persuaded by Johnson to spare his life, as knowledge of her husband's treachery would be the death of Claudia. Suppressing his own love for her, Maclean shames Norreys into giving up his mercenary activities and returning to live an honest life worthy of his wife's devotion. With the involvement of Kitty, Duchess of Queensberry, Kyd is also permitted to live, but is exiled to France.

Delayed several weeks by his adventures, Maclean arrives at Derby too late to join the Prince's forces, who are already in full retreat. He sadly follows the Prince into Scotland, lending Johnson some money for his own journey back to London.

The novel concludes with a return to the opening framing narrative. A further search of the solicitor's papers discloses a letter from Johnson to Maclean, sent several years later, which adds some concluding facts. Maclean had joined the Prince for the Culloden campaign, after which he returned to France. Johnson went on to write his dictionary, using his publisher's advance to repay the loan. Sir John and Lady Norreys had a son; Sir John treated his wife well, and his local reputation was much improved.

Maclean and Johnson remain friends for life.

== Principal Characters ==
- Alastair Maclean, Jacobite Scotsman and follower of Charles Stuart
- Lord Cornbury, Jacobite sympathiser
- Kitty, Duchess of Queensberry, a Whig
- Nicholas Kyd, Scottish country squire and agent to the Duke of Queensberry
- Edom Lowrie, servant to Kyd
- Sir John Norreys, 22-year-old ambitious country squire, working for Kyd
- Claudia Grevel, later Lady Norreys, Jacobite sympathiser and wife of Sir John
- Samuel Johnson, previously a private tutor to Claudia
- Squire Thicknesse, Claudia's uncle
- Midwinter, leader of the Spoonbills – a secret group of working men of 'Old England'
- James Oglethorpe, English Army general
- The Spainneach, (Note: Properly Spàinneach, Scottish Gaelic for "Spaniard".) recruiter for the Spanish and French armies
- Gypsy Ben

== Background ==
Buchan was living in Oxfordshire when he wrote the novel, and the countryside around his home provided part of the novel's setting. His house, Elsfield Manor, had associations with the real-life Dr Johnson. One literary stimulus had come from Vernon Watley, a neighbour at Cornbury Park, who in 1921 sent him a copy of his own privately published book Cornbury and the Forest of Wychwood, in which he recounted stories of Lord Cornbury harbouring Jacobite fugitives after Prince Charles's retreat from Derby. Buchan dedicated his book to Watley.

== Critical reception ==
In The Interpreter's House (1975), David Daniell reported that the book was widely admired, by J. B. Priestley among others. Daniell called it "highly successful, being the Huntingtower of Buchan's historical novels", and he praised "the spinnings of the wheel of Chance ... and the cunning plots and counter-plots".

== Bibliography ==
- Daniell, David (1975). The Interpreter's House. London: Nelson. ISBN 0-17-146051-0.
- Lownie, Andrew (1995). John Buchan: The Presbyterian Cavalier. London: Constable and Company Limited. ISBN 0-09-47-2500-4.
- Buchan, Ursula (2019). Beyond the Thirty-Nine Steps : a Life of John Buchan. London: Bloomsbury Publishing. ISBN 978-1-4088-7081-5. OCLC 1045377641.
