= James Oglethorpe =

British army officer, politician and colonial administrator (1696–1785)

General James Oglethorpe
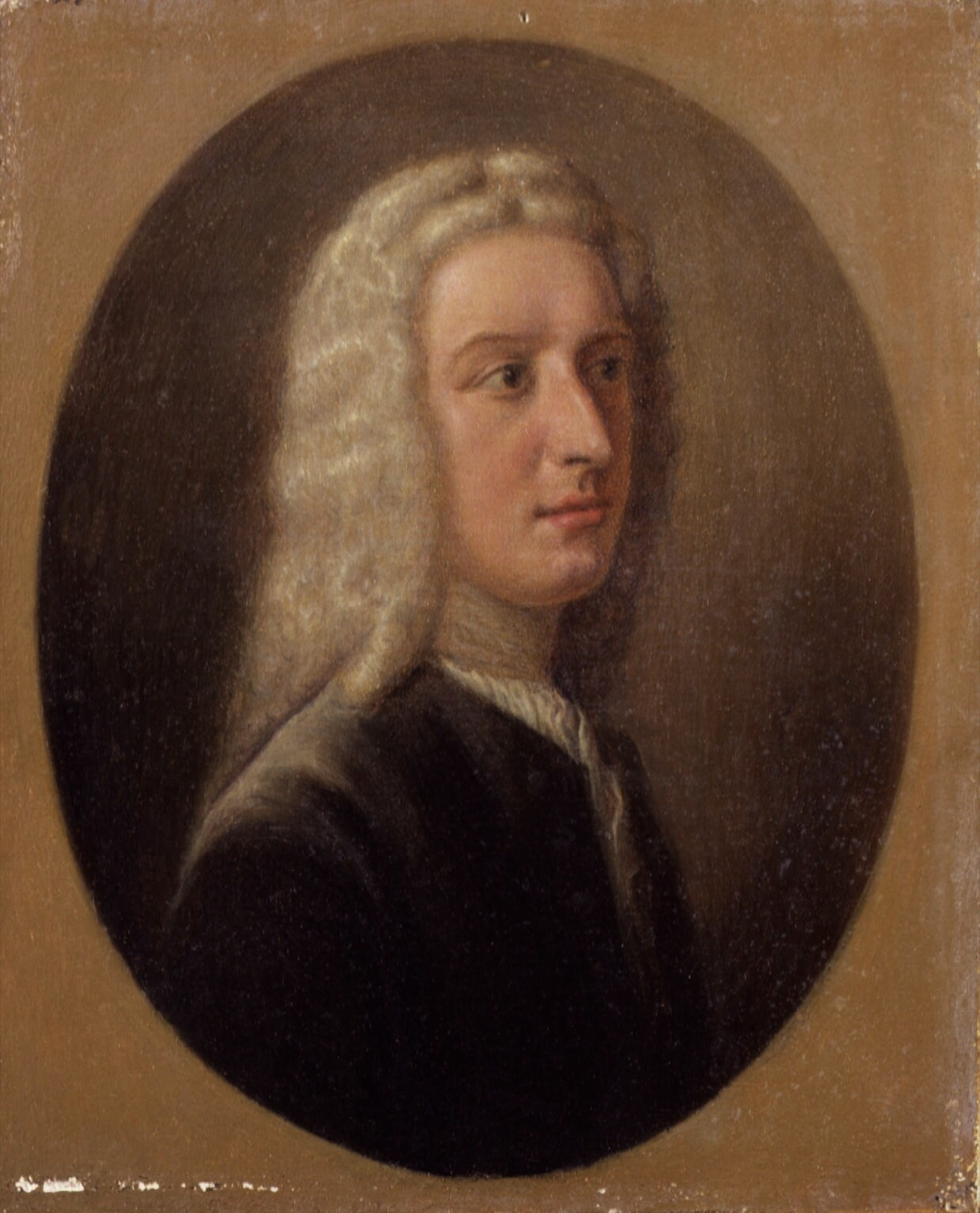
- Portrait by Alfred Edmund Dyer, c. 1927

Governor of Georgia
- In office 9 June 1732 – 22 July 1743
- Preceded by: Office established
- Succeeded by: William Stephens

Member of Parliament for Haslemere
- In office 9 October 1722 – 31 May 1754
- Preceded by: Nicholas Carew
- Succeeded by: James More Molyneux

Personal details
- Born: 22 December 1696 Godalming, Surrey, Kingdom of England
- Died: 30 June 1785 (aged 88) Cranham, Essex, England, Great Britain
- Resting place: All Saints Church, Cranham, Essex, England, U.K.
- Party: Tory
- Spouse: Elizabeth Oglethorpe (née Wright)
- Education: Corpus Christi College, Oxford
- Profession: Army officer, politician, colonial administrator

Military service
- Allegiance: Great Britain (1707–1715, 1737–1785); Holy Roman Empire (1716–1718)
- Branch/service: British Army; Imperial Army of the Holy Roman Emperor
- Rank: General (Great Britain)
- Unit: 1st Regiment of Foot Guards
- Commands: Oglethorpe's Regiment
- Battles/wars: Austro-Turkish War (1716–1718); Battle of Petrovaradin; Siege of Temeşvar (1716); Siege of Belgrade (1717); War of Jenkins' Ear; Siege of St. Augustine (1740); Battle of Gully Hole Creek; Battle of Bloody Marsh

General James Edward Oglethorpe (22 December 1696 – 30 June 1785) was a British army officer, Tory politician and colonial administrator best known for founding the Province of Georgia in British America. As a social reformer, he hoped to resettle Britain's "worthy poor" into British colonies located at the New World, initially focusing on those in debtors' prisons.

Born to a prominent British family, Oglethorpe left college in Britain and a British Army purchase commissions in order to travel to France, where he attended a military academy before fighting under Prince Eugene of Savoy in the Austro-Turkish War. He returned to Britain in 1718 and was elected to the British House of Commons in 1722. His early years were relatively undistinguished until 1729, when he was made chair of the Gaols Committee that investigated British debtors' prisons. After the report was published, to widespread attention, Oglethorpe and the others began publicising the idea of a new British colony to serve as a buffer between the Carolinas and Spanish Florida. After being granted a charter, he sailed for Georgia in 1732.

Oglethorpe was a major figure in Georgia's early history, he held much civil to military power and instituted bans on slavery and alcohol. During the War of Jenkins' Ear, he led the British forces based in Georgia against the Spanish forces based in Florida. In 1740, he led a lengthy siege of St. Augustine, which was unsuccessful. He then defeated a Spanish invasion of Georgia in 1742. Oglethorpe left Georgia after another unsuccessful invasion of St. Augustine and never returned. He led government troops in the Jacobite rising of 1745 and was heavily blamed for his role in the Clifton Moor Skirmish. Despite being cleared in a court martial, Oglethorpe never held a military command again. He lost reelection to the House of Commons in 1754 and left Britain, possibly serving undercover in the Prussian Army during the Seven Years' War. In his later years, Oglethorpe was prominent in literary circles, becoming close to James Boswell and Samuel Johnson.

== Early life and family ==
Oglethorpe family’s coat of arms

James Oglethorpe's family history dates back to William the Conqueror. His family supported Charles I of England during the English Civil War and suffered under the rule of Oliver Cromwell, but regained favour after the Stuart Restoration in 1660. Theophilus Oglethorpe, the head of the family, lived next to the Palace of Whitehall; he and his brothers were members of Parliament. At Whitehall, Theophilus met Eleanor Wall, one of Queen Anne's ladies-in-waiting, and they married in 1680. They had ten children: Lewis, Anne, Eleanor, Theophilus Jr., James, Frances Charlotte, Sutton, Louise Mary, and James Edward. James Edward was the Oglethorpes' youngest child and fifth son. He was born on 22 December 1696. (Note: When Oglethorpe died, his age was misreported in various publications as one hundred years or over. His age was commonly over-reported until the publication of James Edward Oglethorpe: Imperial Idealist in 1936. This was likely because the last known sketch of Oglethorpe four months before his death, by Samuel Ireland, was titled "Genl Oglethorpe, aged 102". John Nichols wrote in an issue of the Gentleman's Magazine that Oglethorpe "was always unable to tell his age: perhaps he was not certain about it". Hudson speculates that the discrepancy is due to the fact that the family had another child named James, born earlier.) Little is known about his early life. He was named James after James II, reflecting his family's royalist sympathies, and Edward after James Francis Edward Stuart. He was baptised on 23 December at St Martin-in-the-Fields in London.

== Early military career ==
In 1707, Oglethorpe's father bought him an ensign's commission in the British Army's 1st Regiment of Foot Guards. On 21 November 1713, he was promoted to lieutenant. Following in his older brothers' footsteps, Oglethorpe studied at Eton College, and subsequently his mother managed to have him enter Corpus Christi College, Oxford, where he matriculated on 8 July 1714 with Basil Kennett as his tutor. George I of Great Britain renewed his army commission in 1715, but Oglethorpe resigned on 23 November 1715, in part because his regiment was not expected to see action.

Oglethorpe then travelled to France, where his sisters Anne and Fanny lived. He attended the military academy at Lompres, near Paris, where he met and befriended fellow-student James Francis Edward Keith. The next year, intending to fight in the Austro-Turkish War, he travelled to serve under the Austrian general Prince Eugene of Savoy. With a letter of recommendation from the Duke of Argyll and several other prominent Britons, Oglethorpe and Louis François Crozat arrived and alongside Infante Manuel, Count of Ourém joined the Imperial Army of the Holy Roman Emperor on 3 August as aides-de-camp to Eugene. Oglethorpe was present but not actively engaged in the Battle of Petrovaradin in August 1716. He was also present at the siege of Temeşvar in September. He found active command at the siege of Belgrade from 19 June to 16 August. After the death of his superior in combat, on 16 August, Oglethorpe, as the most senior aide-de-camp, acted as adjutant general, took possession of the Ottoman camp, and reported the siege's casualties to Eugene. After the battle, he was offered the rank of lieutenant colonel but did not accept.

Oglethorpe then fought in Sicily under General George Olivier Wallis in 1718 for several weeks. By 19 September, he had left the Imperial Army and returned to England. Despite hoping otherwise, Oglethorpe was refused a commission in the British army and was briefly back at Corpus Christi beginning on 25 June 1719.

== Member of Parliament ==
When he was 26, Oglethorpe inherited the family estate at Godalming in Surrey from his brother. He was first elected to the House of Commons as a Tory aligned with William Wyndham in 1722, representing Haslemere. Oglethorpe remained unchallenged until 1734. He almost did not serve when, in a drunken brawl, he killed a man and spent five months in prison, before he was cleared of murder through a powerful friend's influence and released from prison. He took his seat in the House of Commons on 9 October.

According to Pitofsky, Oglethorpe was "among the least productive representatives". In the six years after he was elected, he was actively involved in only two debates. In contrast, Sweet writes that Oglethorpe was an "eloquent yet honest" speaker who had strong Tory principles and genuinely cared about his constituents' conditions, noting his service on 40 committees that investigated widely varied topics. Oglethorpe's first debate was on 6 April 1723; he unsuccessfully opposed the banishment of the bishop Francis Atterbury, who had been accused of supporting James Francis Edward Stuart.

In 1728, in response to the poor living and working conditions of sailors in the Royal Navy, Oglethorpe published an anonymous pamphlet, The Sailors Advocate, about press gangs and pay issues. (Note: While Oglethorpe never formally admitted to writing the pamphlet, many of his biographers attribute it to him. Church writes that the pamphlet's "actual writer is undoubtedly Oglethorpe". None of the pamphlets that Oglethorpe is thought to have written had his name on them.) It was 52 pages long and argued for reforming and strengthening the Navy and against impressment, but proposed few real solutions apart from analysing the work of other countries' navies. Sweet considers it the beginning of Oglethorpe's philanthropy and writes that it "gave Oglethorpe the practical experience necessary to undertake future efforts more successfully". The pamphlet was reprinted several times in the 18th century.

=== Gaols Committee ===
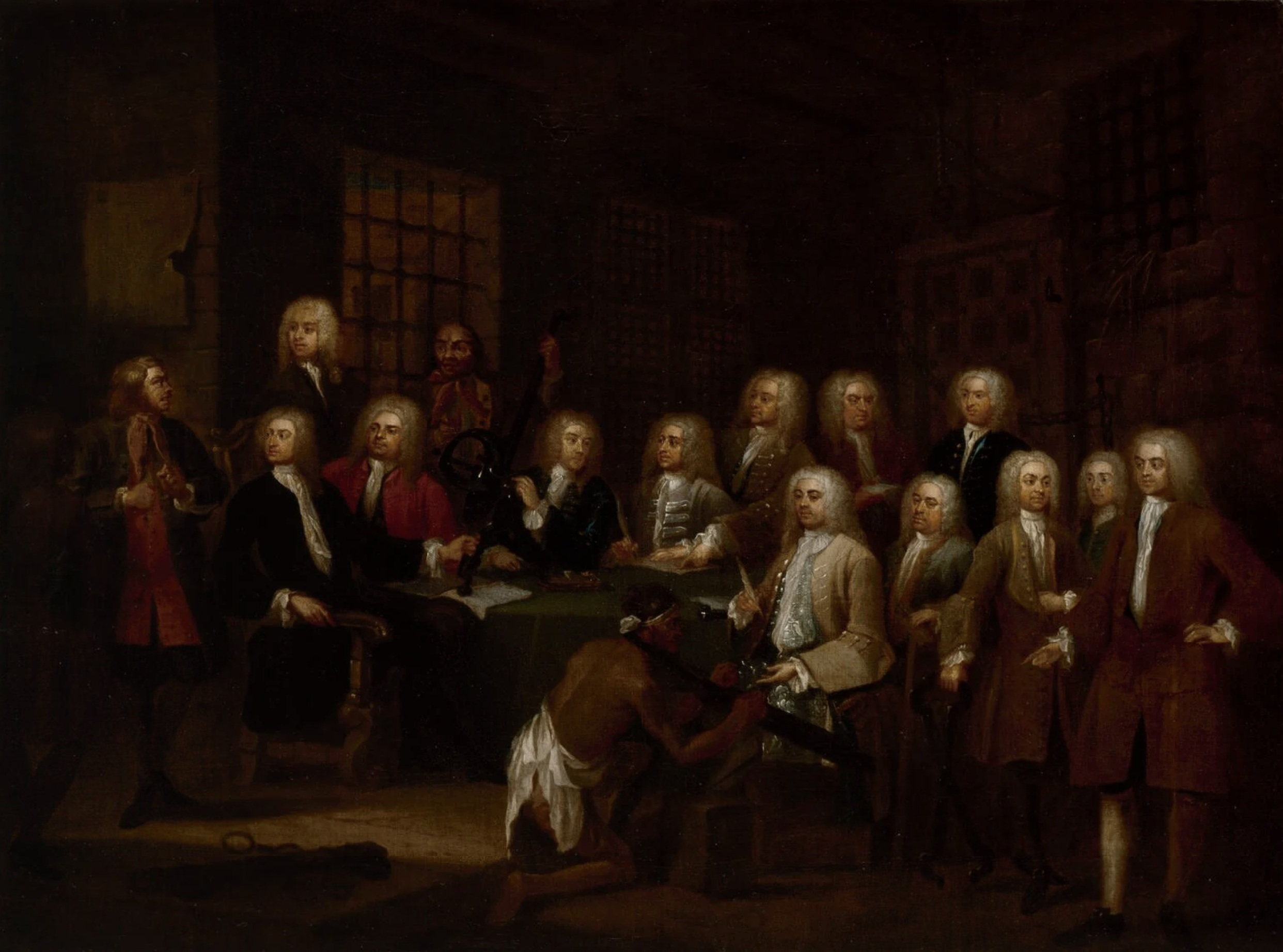
Thomas Bambridge (standing, far left) being questioned by Oglethorpe (believed to be the figure seated, far left, in front of Bainbridge) of the parliamentary Gaols Committee.

In the late 1720s, Oglethorpe's attention was drawn to the conditions of debtors' prisons after his friend, Robert Castell, was sent to Fleet Prison and eventually died. Oglethorpe motioned to investigate the prison's warden, and was made chairman of the resulting committee on 25 February 1729. As chair of the Gaols Committee, he began touring debtors' prisons in late February and in March finished the first of three detailed reports presented to Parliament. The reports described various abuses in the prisons, including torturing, overcrowding, and widespread disease. They particularly attacked Thomas Bambridge, the warden of Fleet Prison, where Castell had died. Oglethorpe urged reform of the prisons, mainly through prosecution of those in charge of them. Most of the blame was laid on the individual wardens, rather than the system as a whole. The reports attracted much attention, but little real change ensued. The investigation ended on 14 May.

In the aftermath (the final report was presented on 8 May 1730), prominent Britons such as Alexander Pope, James Thomson, Samuel Wesley, and William Hogarth praised Oglethorpe and the committee. Pitofsky writes that there was seemingly a "great deal of popular support for the committee". But Conservative members of the House of Commons attempted to prevent change by deriding the committee members as "amateurs and zealots" and preventing the wardens from being jailed. On 3 April 1730, a bill Oglethorpe drafted was presented to the House; it would have removed Bambridge from his position. Both Houses adopted it in a revised form six weeks later, but recommendations for a bill to better oversee Fleet Prison were discarded. William Acton was tried for murdering four debtors, but acquitted. Oglethorpe felt that the proceedings had been manipulated. Bambridge was also acquitted of charges, and Oglethorpe denounced both acquittals. Shortly afterwards, he disbanded the committee. He led another committee of the same nature in 1754.

=== Other stances and later service ===
A committed advocate against alcohol, Oglethorpe proposed a tax on malt in the same session the Gaols Committee was authorised. He argued against a royal grant of 115,000 pounds to cover arrearages, considering it extravagant. Oglethorpe also initially opposed Britain's involvement in making peace in Europe, but by 1730 had begun advocating military preparedness. He served on a committee investigating the Charitable Corporation after its 1731 collapse. In the 1732 Parliamentary session, he opposed the administration's policy of disarmament and continued to emphasise the need for preparedness. Although Oglethorpe held his seat until 1754, he was rarely involved in parliamentary affairs after he went to Georgia, and after Robert Walpole lost his power in 1742 Oglethorpe lost most of his remaining influence and primarily held office in opposition to those who held power.

== Establishment of Georgia ==
While working on the Gaols Committee, Oglethorpe met and became close to John Perceval (who later became the first Earl of Egmont). After leaving the committee, Oglethorpe considered sending around 100 unemployed people from London to America. In 1730, he shared a plan to establish a new American colony with Perceval. The colony would be a place to send "the unemployed and the unemployable", and he anticipated broad societal support. The trustees of the estate of a man named King soon granted Oglethorpe 5,000 pounds for the colony. He began looking for other sources of funding and met Thomas Bray, a reverend and philanthropist. Bray, in failing health by 1730, had founded the Bray Associates to continue his humanitarian work. Perceval was a trustee of the associates, and Oglethorpe was made a trustee in February 1730, the month Bray died. Although initially there was no set location for the colony, Oglethorpe settled on America on 1 April. It soon became clear that a colony south of the Savannah River would be supported by the House of Commons, as it could serve as a 'buffer' between the prosperous Carolinas and Spanish Florida, and Oglethorpe picked the region on 26 June. People sent to the colony would serve as both soldiers and farmers, making the colony 'South Carolina's first line of defence'. In July, they started campaigns to raise money through subscription and grants.

The Bray Associates determined to put 'all available funds' towards the colony on 1 July, and presented a charter to the Privy Council of the United Kingdom on 17 September. On 12 November, the Bray Associates announced a plan to increase support for their proposed colony through a promotional campaign, which mainly consisted of producing promotional literature. Baine writes that beginning in 1730, Oglethorpe 'directed the promotional campaign and wrote, or edited, almost all of the promotional literature until he sailed for Georgia'. The first written work about the proposal was by Oglethorpe and titled Some accounts of the design of the trustees for establishing colonys in America. Though it was finished in spring 1731 and never published, Benjamin Martyn drew on it in writing his 1732 book Some Account of the Designs of the Trustees for Establishing the Colony of Georgia in America. (Note: There is some speculation that Oglethorpe himself wrote the book. Trevor R. Reese writes in The Most Delightful Country of the Universe that if Oglethorpe wrote the book, he "probably received assistance from the Trustees' secretary, Benjamin Martyn, and it is conceivable that Martyn was, in fact, the author". The Oxford Dictionary of National Biography treats Martyn's authorship as fact. Similarly, Oglethorpe is generally thought to have edited the 1732 Select Tracts Relating to Colonies, though there is some uncertainty.)

Oglethorpe arranged for Martyn's work to be widely read; in addition to being independently published, it appeared in The London Journal, the Country Journal, the Gentlemen's Magazine, and the South Carolina Gazette. Various notices seeking donations and people willing to emigrate to the colony were published in other English newspapers. In November 1732, Oglethorpe had Select Tracts Relating to Colonies published. In 1733, Reasons for Establishing the Colony of Georgia in America, by Martyn, and A New and Accurate Account of the Provinces of South-Carolina and Georgia, by Oglethorpe, were published. Oglethorpe is thought to have paid for the publication of Select Tracts and A New and Accurate Account. In 1732, he advocated extending Thomas Lombe's patent on a silk engine.

On 9 June 1732, Oglethorpe, Perceval, Martyn, and a group of other prominent Britons (collectively known as the Trustees for the Establishment of the Colony of Georgia in America) petitioned for and were eventually granted a royal charter to establish the colony of Georgia between the Savannah River and the Altamaha River. The next month they selected the first group to send to the colony from wide-ranging applications. Oglethorpe's mother had died on 19 June, and he decided to join the group and travel to Georgia. He was formally placed in charge of publicizing the Georgia colony on 3 August.

That summer, a letter written by Ayuba Suleiman Diallo, an enslaved African trader, reached Oglethorpe, who purchased and freed Diallo. Oglethorpe, who had been made a director or assistant of the Royal African Company (RAC) in January 1731 and elected a deputy governor in 1732, sold his stock in the RAC and resigned after the incident and shortly before leaving for Georgia. He set sail from Gravesend for Georgia with 114 others on the merchant ship Anne on 15 or 17 November 1732.

== In Georgia ==
Anne reached Charleston, South Carolina, on 13 January 1733. When they arrived in Georgia 1 February 1733, Spalding notes that Oglethorpe chose to settle "as far from the Spanish as he geographically could". As Spain disliked their presence in the region, Oglethorpe was careful to maintain good relations with the Native Americans who lived in the region. He left for England and expanded Georgia further south when he returned. When Oglethorpe returned to England in 1737 he was confronted by both angry British and Spanish governments. That year, Oglethorpe granted land to 40 Jewish settlers against the orders of the Georgia trustees.

On 4 December 1731, Oglethorpe entered into a partnership with Jean-Pierre Pury to settle land in South Carolina. He gained a 1/4 stake in a 3,000-acre (1,200 ha) plot of land. His holdings, termed the 'Oglethorpe Barony' were located at the 'Palachocolas', a crossing of the Savannah River in Granville County. He may have held the tract, around 2,060 acres (830 ha), for the trustees. From 1732 to 1738, Oglethorpe was the de facto leader of Georgia and dominated both the military and the civil aspects of the country. From 1738 to 1743 he commanded a British regiment and was also involved in civil affairs before returning to England. While he was involved with the colony, Oglethorpe was the most prominent trustee and the only one to actually live in the colony. He was also involved in mapping the colony.

Oglethorpe founded the still-active Solomon's Masonic Lodge in 1734.

=== Early influence ===
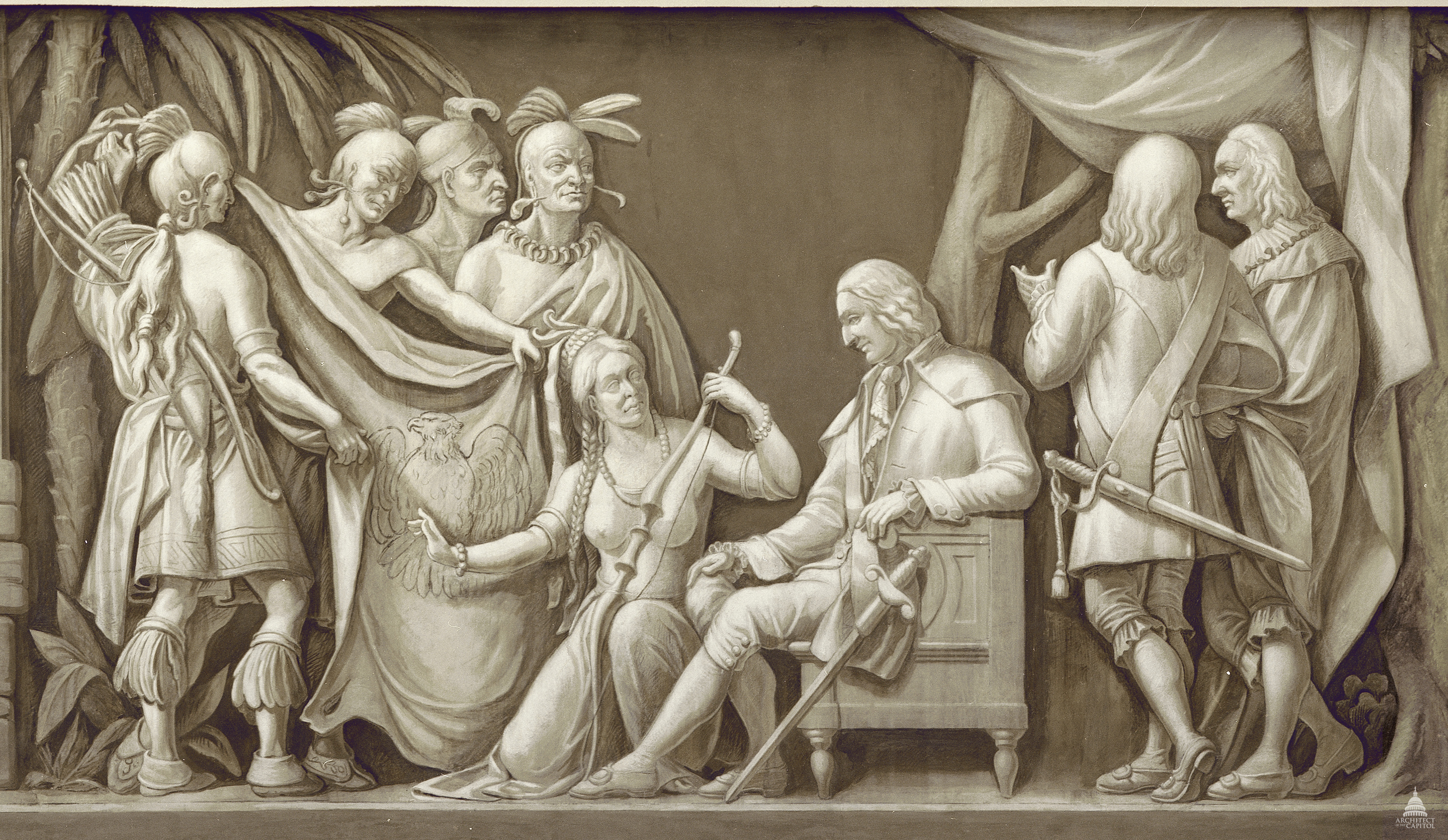
Oglethorpe and the Indians, frieze in the United States Capitol Rotunda. Photo courtesy of the Architect of the Capitol

Oglethorpe and the trustees formulated a contractual, multi-tiered plan for the settlement of Georgia (see the Oglethorpe Plan). The plan envisioned a system of "agrarian equality", designed to support and perpetuate an economy based on family farming, and prevent social disintegration associated with unregulated urbanisation. Land ownership was limited to fifty acres (20 ha), a grant that included a town lot, a garden plot near town, and a forty-five-acre (18 ha) farm. Self-supporting colonists were able to obtain larger grants, but such grants were structured in fifty acres (20 ha) increments tied to the number of indentured servants supported by the grantee. Servants would receive a land grant of their own upon completing their term of service. No-one was permitted to acquire additional land through purchase or inheritance.

Despite arriving in Georgia with relatively limited power, Oglethorpe soon became the main authority in the colony. Lannen writes that he "became everything to everyone". He negotiated with the Yamacraw—becoming the colony's ambassador to native tribes—commanded the militia, directed the building of Savannah and otherwise generally supervised the colony. In early 1733, "every matter of importance was brought first to Oglethorpe". He lived in a tent separated from the rest of the colonists; some of them called him "father". Oglethorpe paid for the construction of a 'first fort' to protect Savannah, but it was not completed. He invited talented foreigners to immigrate to the colony. In June 1733, Oglethorpe travelled to Charleston. In his absence, the citizens of Savannah had a disagreement over the authority of the man left in charge. They waited for Oglethorpe to return and resolve it. It was not until July that a separate court was established, but Oglethorpe continued to hold much civil power.

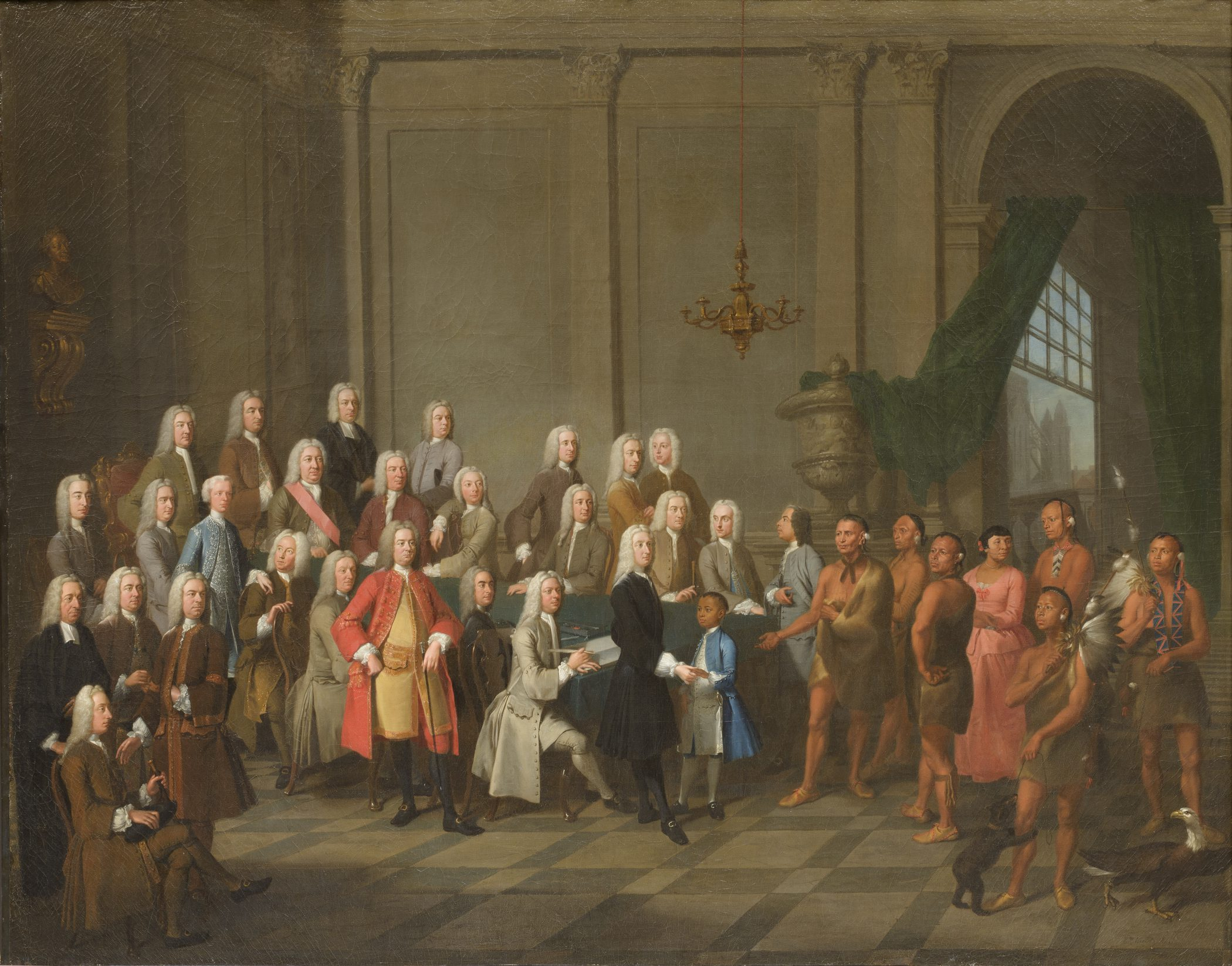
Oglethorpe (centre, in black) and the trustees meeting with a Yamacraw delegation led by Tomochichi in 1734

When Oglethorpe arrived in Georgia, Native Americans were well into the process of integration with the Europeans. He saw Native Americans as participants in the new economy Europeans brought to America. Weaver notes that he was known for "fair dealing with the Indians". He negotiated with Tomochichi, chief of the Yamacraw tribe for land to build Savannah on. Tomochichi became Oglethope's "strongest ally in the New World."

As there were rumors a war with France might break out in early 1734, Oglethorpe travelled to Charleston, arriving on 2 March. While there he discussed Indian affairs and, after conferencing with the leadership of the Carolinas, decided to raise a company to build "a fort among the Upper Creek" that would counter French influence in the area and serve as a safe house for traders should a war break out between native tribes. Oglethorpe commissioned Patrick Mackay a captain and delegated the task to him. On 7 May, Oglethorpe departed for Britain aboard HMS Aldborough, taking with him a Creek delegation, including Tomochichi, who was invited by the Georgia trustees to be present during the formal ratification of Oglethorpe's treaty with the Yamacraw.

The delegation arrived on 16 June, and met King George II and his family at Kensington Palace. Oglethorpe was widely acclaimed in London, although his expansionism was not welcomed in all quarters. The Duke of Newcastle, who directed British foreign policy, had tried to restrain Oglethorpe's efforts in the colony for fear of offending the Spanish, whom Newcastle wished unsuccessfully to court as an ally. Newcastle eventually relented, and became a supporter of the colony, admitting "it will now be pretty difficult to give up Georgia". The colony's existence was one of several disputes which worsened Anglo-Spanish relations in the late 1730s. When Tomochichi returned to England, he said that parting with Oglethorpe was "like the day of death". In March 1735 the trustees requested 51,800 pounds from parliament, upon the urging of Oglethorpe, in part to construct forts along the Altamaha River. 26,000 pounds were eventually budgeted and the trustees approved construction of two forts on the river.

Oglethorpe's return to England reinvigorated interest in meetings of Georgia's trustees. At his urging the trustees banned the sale of rum, slavery, and regulated negotiations with Native Americans. He was placed in charge of granting licenses to trade with Native Americans, a power that he used often, only granting the right to Georgians and causing Carolinian resentment. When Oglethorpe returned to England in 1734, he had left an authority vacuum behind. There was disagreement between the civil and military authorities while he was away; a reported insurrection played a role in his decision to return. In December 1735, he left for Georgia with 257 further immigrants to the colony, arriving in February 1736.

For the nine months that he remained in the colony, Oglethorpe was mainly at Frederica, a town he laid out to function as a bulwark against Spanish interference, where he again held the most authority. He drilled soldiers and oversaw the construction of a fort. In May he travelled to Savannah and heard 300–400 complaints, serving as "supreme civil authority". Increasingly, however, Oglethorpe focused on Georgia's southern border and military matters. He remained confident in the belief that he was "best suited to govern". Oglethorpe also held a conference with the Natives as commissioner for Indian Affairs in 1736. Complaints about Oglethorpe's actions came from Spain, Carolina, the trustees, and discontented citizens. Oglethorpe left the colony in November to request a military regiment, leaving behind another power vacuum. Discontent increased, which Oglethorpe considered a symptom of his absence. In England, he convinced the trustees of his "impeccable conduct" and was thanked for his service.

=== War of Jenkins' Ear ===
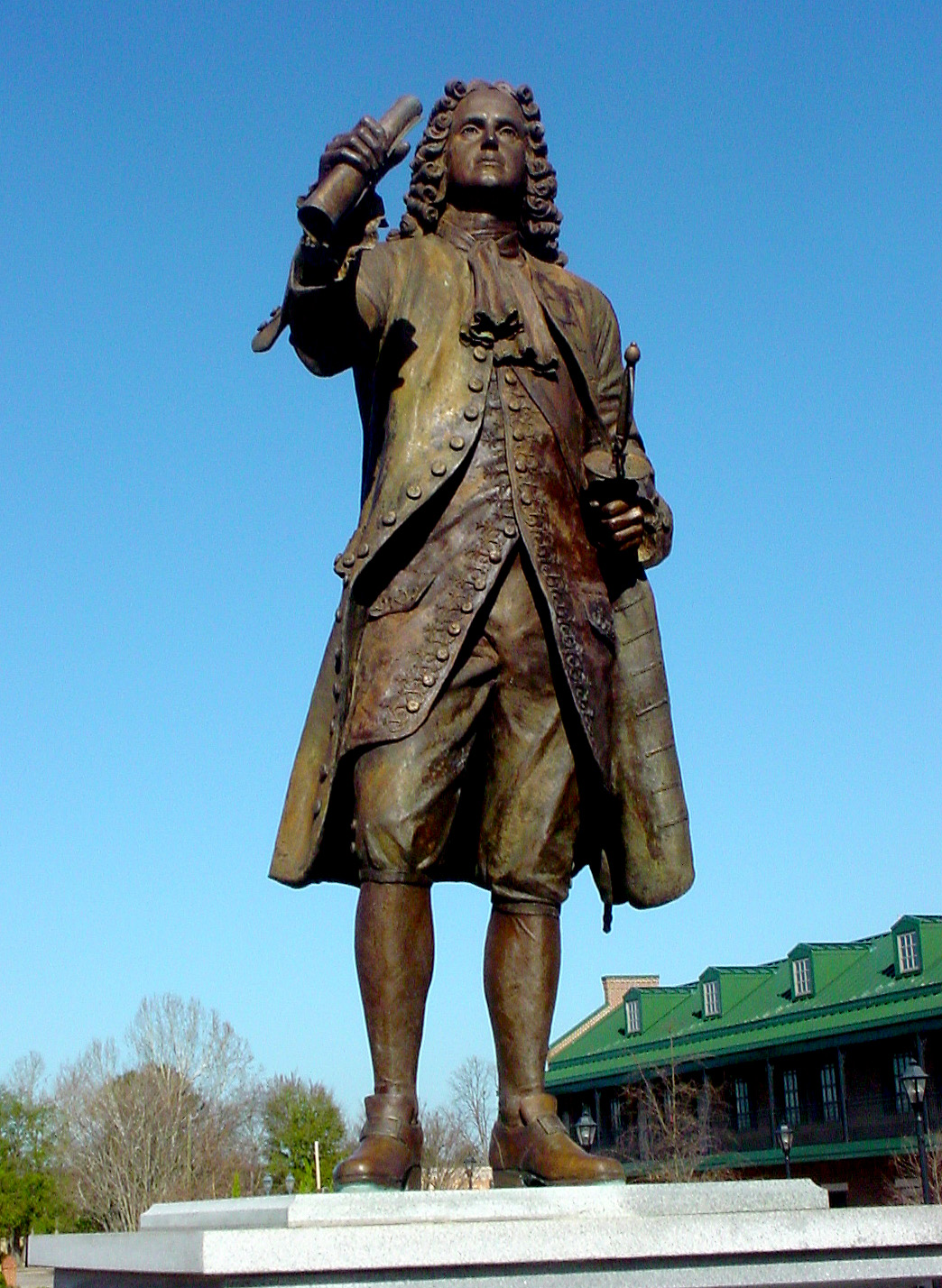
Statue of James Oglethorpe at the Augusta Common, an open space he personally designed when co-founding the city in 1735.

When Oglethorpe left England the first time, Robert Walpole had ordered him to avoid intentional conflict with Spain. However, given the intended function of Georgia as a 'buffer', Oglethorpe considered conflict with Spain to be inevitable. When Oglethorpe returned to lobby for military aid in 1737, he began by requesting a grant of 30,000 pounds from parliament in January. He also requested unsuccessfully to be allowed to raise a militia, but was granted 20,000 pounds and made general of the forces of South Carolina and Georgia. He was offered, but declined governorship of South Carolina. In 1737, Thomas Pelham-Holles granted him permission to raise a line infantry regiment, which became known as Oglethorpe's Regiment and was ranked as the 42nd Regiment of Foot, for defence of Georgia's border with Spanish Florida.

On 10 September 1737, Oglethorpe promoted to the rank of colonel as Colonel of the Regiment. The following year, 246 officers and other ranks of the 25th Regiment of Foot were incorporated into Oglethorpe's Regiment. After three further companies were recruited in England, the regiment was stationed at Fort Frederica. A Spanish invasion of the colony was planned in March 1738, but cancelled. In response to Oglethorpe raising a regiment, other trustees—mainly Edward Vernon—became more vocal in insisting that Oglethorpe stay out of the colony's civil affairs. They also accused him of being an opportunist by starting to vote with Robert Walpole and felt Oglethorpe did not adequately keep the trustees informed of affairs in the colonies. Before allowing Oglethorpe to return to Georgia, they had "laboured to abridge his power". In October or September 1738 he returned to Frederica and soon had re-assumed his role as de facto leader of the colony.

Oglethorpe began to prepare for a war after as early as 1738, raising additional troops and rented or purchased several boats after the Royal Navy refused to station a ship there. Oglethorpe spent his whole fortune, £103,395, (Note: Oglethorpe hoped Parliament would repay him, and while most was, some debt was still unpaid when he died.) on building up Georgia's defences. He allowed a pirate to attack Spanish shipping and worked to secure the support of the Native Americans in the area by meeting with them. He soon became very sick, and remained in poor health for the duration of the campaign. While Oglethorpe was preparing for war, he also worked to combine civil and military authority. He increasingly ignored the wishes of the other trustees, for instance not passing on a change in the land policy when he felt that the colonists would object to it. The War of Jenkins' Ear broke out in 1739.

After receiving a letter from King George II on 7 September 1739, Oglethorpe began encouraging the Creek Indians to attack Spanish Florida. A mutiny by troops from Europe was quickly quelled. In response to a Spanish attack in November, he led 200 men in a raid on Florida, on 1 December. They penetrated as far as Fort Picolata, but retreated when it became clear they had insufficient firepower to take the fort. The troops were then ordered to attack the Castillo de San Marcos with support from Virginia and South Carolina. After Oglethorpe sent William Bull a list of the supplies he needed on 29 December, he launched an invasion on 1 January 1740, again with 200 men. They captured Fort Picolata and Fort San Francisco de Pupo, burning the former and claiming the latter for Georgia. After leaving some troops at de Pupa, Oglethorpe returned to Georgia on 11 January.

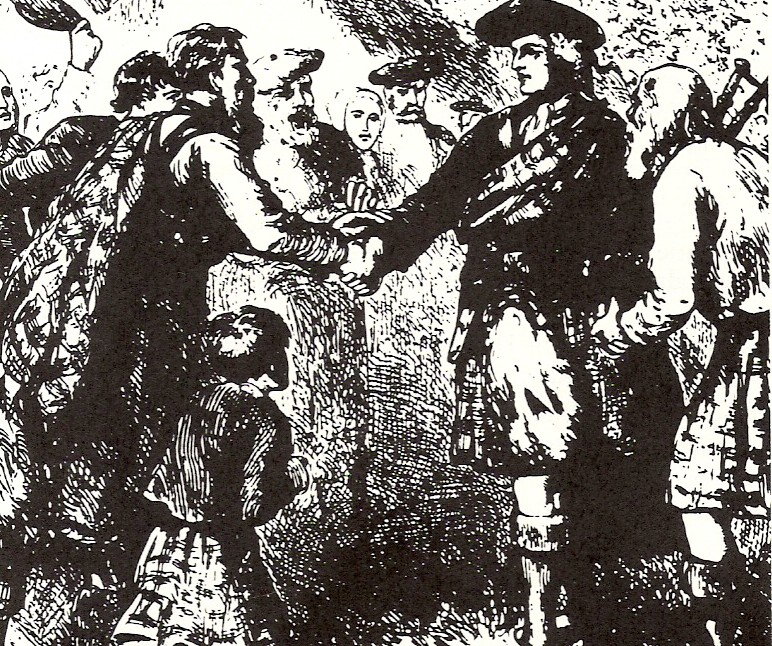
Oglethorpe greeting Highland settlers in Darien on 22 February 1736

After South Carolina was slow in providing aid, Oglethorpe travelled to Charles Town, and arrived on 23 March, where he spoke with the Commons House of Assembly. They eventually agreed to provide 300 of Oglethorpe's requested 800 men. The assembly also agreed to send provisions to keep the Native Americans on their side. 20 South Carolinians arrived by 23 April and another hundred by 9 May. After receiving these men, Oglethorpe attacked Fort St. Diego on 10 May and had captured it by 12 May. On 18 May, the commander of the provincial regiment South Carolina had raised arrived and by the end of the month there were 376 officers and other ranks present. Its size peaked at 512 troops in addition to 47 volunteers and 54 men who remained on the schooner Pearl. The colony also sent artillery and ships, leading Oglethorpe to conclude that South Carolina had given "all the assistance they could".

Oglethorpe was also aided by some Native Americans. He struggled with a lack of equipment and skill needed to take a besieged city; there were no engineers, draft horses, or gunners. Upon his request, several other colonies sent supplies, notably Rhode Island and Virginia. The Royal Navy provided a poor blockade of St. Augustine, fully beginning only on 31 May. As early as April, St. Augustine had begun preparing for a siege. Throughout May and June, Oglethorpe planned how he would take the city. He initially planned for a siege and an assault, but this quickly proved impractical given his lack of supplies. Next, Oglethorpe instituted a blockade that was designed to starve the inhabitants of the city into surrender; this was accomplished with the Royal Navy and soldiers on the land. Fort San Francisco de Pupo was used to block supplies entering through the St. John's River.

On 15 June, the main contingent of soldiers were resoundingly defeated by an attack by the Spanish and Yamasee. Later that month, a flotilla aimed at reinforcing the city slipped through the blockade. As the navy was going to leave upon the start of the hurricane season on 5 July, Oglethorpe then planned to launch a combined assault, from the land and water. After delays, the plan was abandoned on 2 July when the navy announced an intent to leave on 4 July. He briefly considered holding the siege with 200 seamen and a sloop, but decided the idea was impractical. Finally, Oglethorpe was forced to abandon the siege. He commanded the rearguard during the retreat. The trustees presented a 1741 plan to divide Georgia into two sections, but Oglethorpe refused to work with them.

Spain launched a counter-invasion of Georgia in 1742. Oglethorpe led his force in a defeat of Spain, decisively winning the Battle of Bloody Marsh. On 25 February 1742, he was made a brigadier general. He led another unsuccessful attack on St. Augustine in 1743. That year, William Stephens was named the president of Georgia. The appointment was a product of the trustees' frustration with Oglethorpe's lack of co-operation. He continued to hold practical control over Frederica and let Stephens control Savannah. Stephens' government began to not always defer to Oglethorpe's wishes, as did local officials. In response, Oglethorpe made another bid to hold his power, feeling Georgia functioned best "when there was no other but himself to direct and determine all controversies."

The ODNB considers that Oglethorpe's "military contribution was of the very highest order and significance". While the loss of the siege of St. Augustine was attributed by some to Oglethorpe, Baine concludes that "Oglethorpe certainly made mistakes of generalship, but he was not the principal cause of its failure." The war ended in November 1748 and Oglethorpe's Regiment was disbanded. By 1749, the Trustees had lost most of their interest in Georgia, and they gave up its charter three years later.

=== Slavery ===
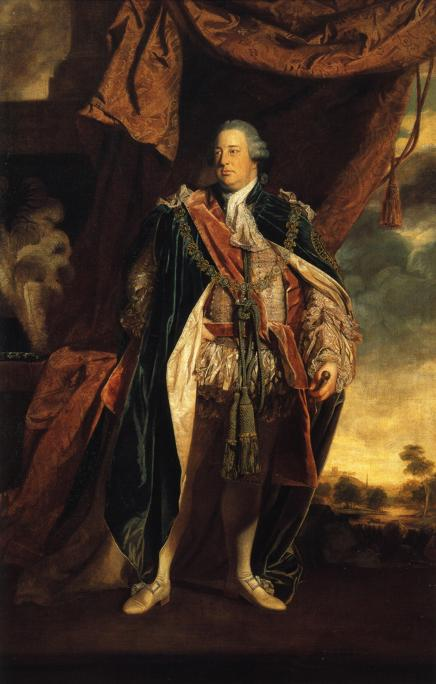
The Duke of Cumberland by Sir Joshua Reynolds

In what was known as the Georgia Experiment, Georgia initially banned Black slavery in the colony. (Note: The enslavement of Native Americans was "common and permitted", according to Thomas Hart Wilkins.) Oglethorpe opposed slavery because he felt that it prevented Georgia from serving as an effective buffer, because he felt slaves would work with the Spanish to gain their freedom. Further, Georgia was not intended to develop an economy based on rice like the Carolinas and its economy was intended to be based on silk and wine, which made large-scale slavery unnecessary. He also felt that slavery would have a negative effect on "the manners and morality of Georgia's white inhabitants". After the urging of Oglethorpe and other trustees, slavery was banned by the House of Commons in 1735.

Oglethorpe was heavily criticised by many for supporting the ban in the late 1730s, and after his return to England the trustees requested that the ban be ended in 1750. It has been suggested, first by William Stephens in his diary, that Oglethorpe held slaves on his land in South Carolina while slavery was banned in Georgia, but Wilkins writes that the veracity of the claim is "uncertain"—there is no direct evidence supporting it—and he concludes that "the probability appears low that [...] Oglethorpe owned slaves."

Biographer Michael Thurmond, himself of African descent, argues controversially in James Oglethorpe, Father Of Georgia — A Founder’s Journey From Slave Trader to Abolitionist (2024), that Oglethorpe's relationship with slavery was complex and evolved over time. Originally a board member of the Royal African Company, he became disillusioned with the institution after visiting America where he was repelled by its cruelty. Thurmond states that there is evidence in the form of correspondence and other records of his growing hostility to slavery. As early as 1739 Oglethorpe asserted that the introduction of slavery into Georgia would “occasion the misery of thousands in Africa.” He assisted two former slaves who travelled to England to raise awareness about the evils of the institution. Later in life he became associated with Granville Sharp and Hannah More, two of the early founders of the abolitionist movement in Great Britain.

== Return to Britain ==
Oglethorpe returned home back to England, Great Britain on 28 September 1743, after the last attack on St. Augustine failed. He continued to be somewhat involved in the colony's affairs, attempting to stop a distinction being established between holding civil and military power, but he never returned to Georgia and generally was uninterested in the activities of the trustees. Oglethorpe was subject to a court-martial, in which it was alleged he had misused funds. He was acquitted after two days. Oglethorpe married a woman, named Elizabeth Wright on 15 September 1744.

Oglethorpe served in the British Army during the Jacobite rising of 1745. By then a major general, he took command of approximately 600 government troops which were mustering in York, England. Jacobite Army troops under Charles Edward Stuart had penetrated into England, and Oglethorpe was tasked in December 1745 with intercepting retreating Jacobite forces before they reached Preston, Lancashire. On 17 December, he was initially ordered to engage with the rear of the Jacobite army, led by George Murray, at Shap. The orders were amended to trap the Jacobites in town early the next morning upon Oglethorpe's intelligence, but the Jacobite Army left as the orders were changed. The following day, Oglethorpe travelled to Clifton, Cumbria and captured a bridge from the Jacobites before the Clifton Moor Skirmish that evening. At the skirmish, the government forces were unable to prevent the Jacobites from escaping. Because Oglethorpe had allowed the Jacobites to escape from Shap, he was blamed by being accused of disobeying orders, and potentially being a Jacobite. There is circumstantial evidence that he might have had Jacobite sympathies. The following year, Oglethorpe had been court martialled for his actions. After a lengthy defence, he was acquitted by a panel of twelve high-ranking Army officers, led by Thomas Wentworth. On 19 September 1747, Oglethorpe was promoted to lieutenant-general. However, the Duke of Cumberland, who had been in command at Clifton Moor, blacklisted Oglethorpe from holding a command ever again.

He then worked on various reform efforts, with little success, until Oglethorpe and Philip Russell lost their parliamentary seats to James More Molyneux and Philip Carteret Webb in 1754. Oglethorpe's loss has been attributed to his moving to Essex and supporting the Jewish Naturalisation Act, but Baine considers that the election was "rigged against him". Webb and Molyneux gained control of the constituency's steward, bailiff, and constable. They allowed more voters to be admitted than were qualified, in a process known as faggot voting. Around fifty more people voted in the 1754 election than had the previous cycle, in stark contrast to voter numbers that had remained essentially the same since Oglethorpe was elected. While Oglethorpe and Burrell protested to parliament, the election results were upheld.

== Retirement and death ==
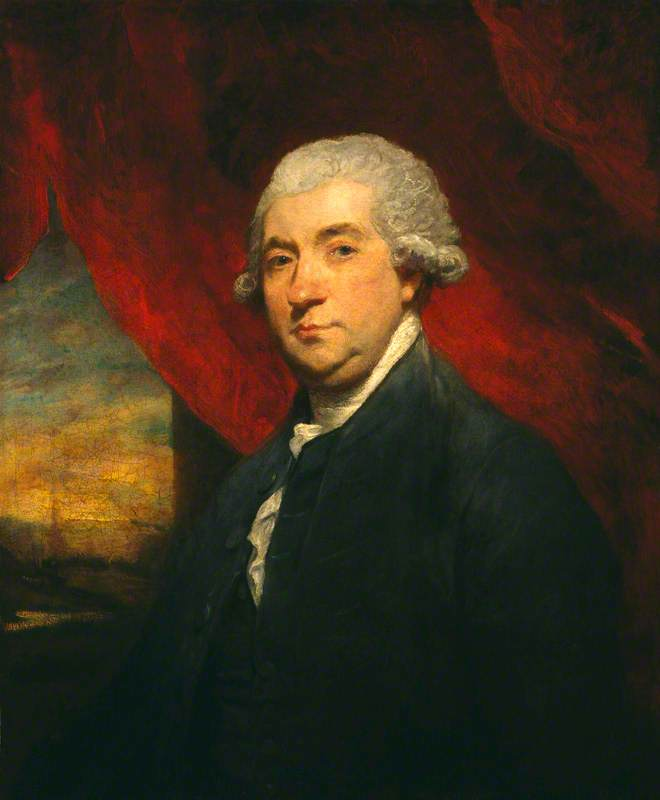
Portrait of James Boswell by Sir Joshua Reynolds, 1785

Little is known about Oglethorpe's later life. He served on the committee of the Hospital for the Maintenance and Education of exposed and deserted young Children and was a member of the Committee to encourage British fisheries. After retirement, he became friends with various literary figures in London, including Samuel Johnson, James Boswell, Hannah More, and Oliver Goldsmith. Oglethorpe and Boswell became particularly close. Boswell and Johnson offered to write a biography of Oglethorpe, and Boswell began to collect materials, but no such volume was ever published.

From 1755 to 1761 Oglethorpe was out of Britain. Very little is known about what he did over these six years; they are referred to as his "missing years". On 22 September, he had unsuccessfully petitioned George III to reactivate Oglethorpe's Regiment, and by 9 December Oglethorpe had left England and arrived in Rotterdam. There he requested a position in the Prussian Army from Keith. There are no records of what happened to Oglethorpe in the five years after he wrote a letter to Keith on 3 May 1756. Boswell wrote that he "went abroad in 1756 to his freind [sic] Keith [...] fought in the army" and "was with Keith when killed". Baine concludes that Oglethorpe took the pseudonym 'John Tebay' and likely joined the Prussian army in mid to late 1756. He was likely with Keith and Frederick the Great during the campaigns of the Seven Years' War, and probably left the army to visit his family over part of the winter. In early 1758, Oglethorpe was almost discovered by Joseph Yorke, an Englishman. Oglethorpe was wounded at a battle on 14 October, and Keith reportedly fell into his arms when he was killed at the Battle of Hochkirch. Leaving the Prussian army in March 1759, Oglethorpe returned to England by October 1761. He was promoted to general in 1765. In May 1768, during the French conquest of Corsica, Oglethorpe pseudonymously published three essays in support of Corsican independence. He advocated strongly in favour of their independence, along with Boswell.

As British-American colonists in the British Thirteen Colonies, including Georgia, became increasingly opposed to British colonial policies in the 1760s and 1770s, Oglethorpe did not publicly speak out but he did privately sympathise with them. In 1775 these grievances led to the outbreak of the American Revolutionary War, and from June 1777 to April 1778 Oglethorpe and Granville Sharp unsuccessfully attempted to convince the British government to end the war and give the colonists their "rights of Englishmen". There was a claim that Oglethorpe refused an offer to command British troops in North America, a claim that Spalding notes scholars have been "unable to discover a shred of truth" to. In June 1785, Oglethorpe met up with U.S. President John Adams twice in London. Oglethorpe died on 1 July 1785, at an estate in Cranham in Essex, to the east of London. He was 88. The cause of death is unknown, though it is thought to have been a disease like influenza that worsened into pneumonia.Oglethorpe remains are buried next to his wife Elizabeth, within the Parish Church of All Saints, in Cranham, Essex, England, United Kingdom.

== Legacy and memorials ==
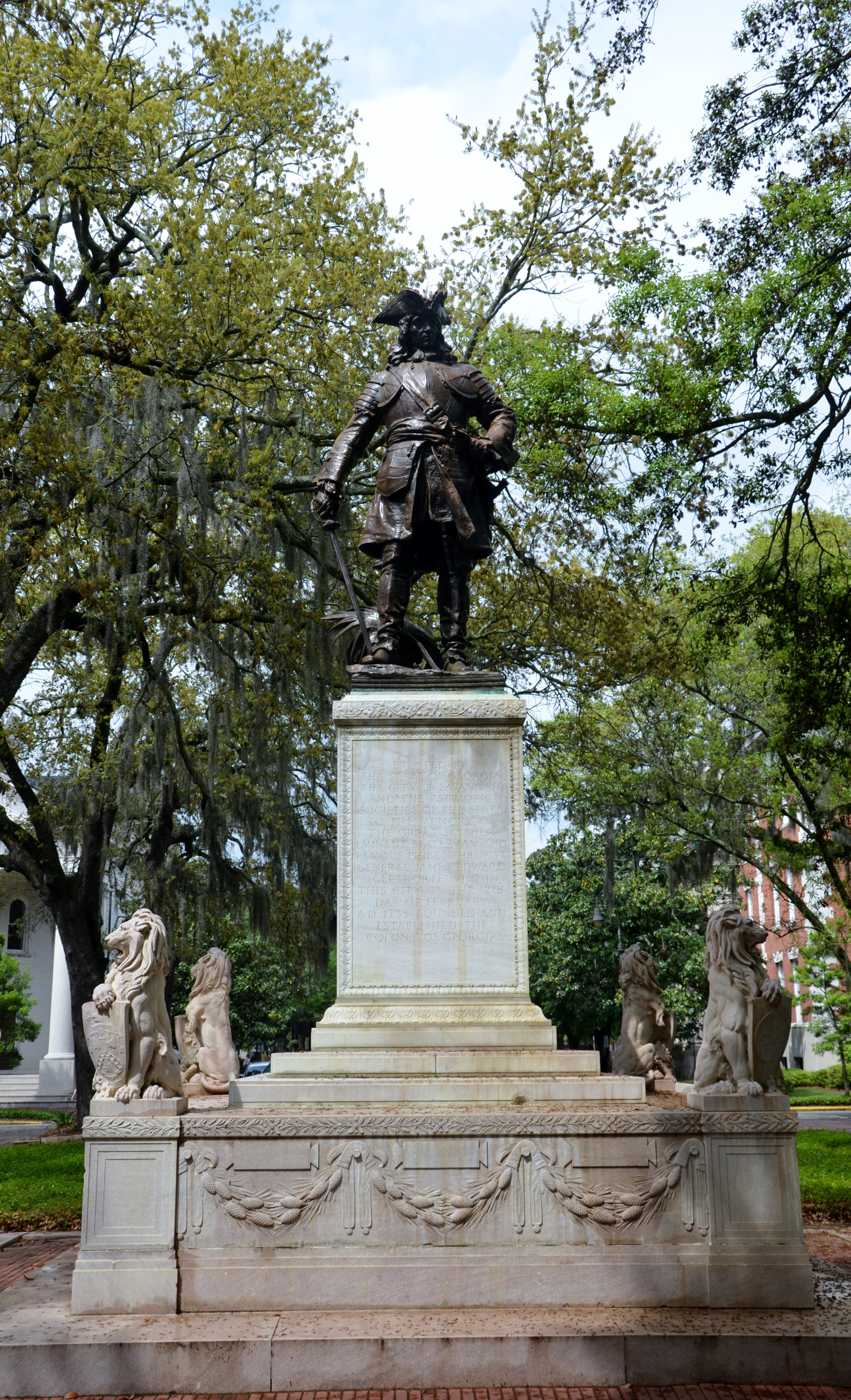
James Oglethorpe Monument, dedicated in 1910, by Daniel Chester French, at the Chippewa square in Savannah, Georgia, United States.

In Atlanta, Oglethorpe University and Oglethorpe Park were named after him, while in the state at large, he is the namesake for both Oglethorpe County and the town of Oglethorpe. Also, The James Oglethorpe Primary School in Cranham is named after him.

In 1986, the corps of cadets at the University of North Georgia in Dahlonega, Georgia officially adopted the name of the unit as the "Boar's Head Brigade". The name came from the boar's head on the department crest approved by the U.S. Army adjutant general on 11 August 1937. The boar's head was a part of the family crest of James Oglethorpe, and is a symbol of fighting spirit and hospitality so deeply a part of Georgia's heritage and the spirit of the corps of cadets at the University of North Georgia.

All Saints' Church in Cranham, where Oglethorpe was buried, was rebuilt c. 1871. However, the new church stands on the same foundations as the old one, and Oglethorpe's poetic marble memorial is on the south wall of the chancel, as before. In the 1930s, the president of Oglethorpe University Thornwell Jacobs excavated the Oglethorpe family vault in the centre of the chancel at All Saints', although permission to translate the General's relics to a purpose-built shrine at Oglethorpe University (Atlanta) had been refused by the archdeacon.

The James Oglethorpe Monument in Chippewa Square, Savannah, Georgia, created by sculptor Daniel Chester French and architect Henry Bacon, was unveiled in 1910. Oglethorpe faces south, toward Georgia's one-time enemy in Spanish Florida, and his sword is drawn. Another of Savannah's squares, Oglethorpe Square, is named for him. Another monument in Jasper, Georgia, is dedicated in his honour.

The city of Fort Oglethorpe in Catoosa and Walker County, Georgia is named for him.

Oglethorpian anniversaries have since led to the donation of the altar rail at All Saints' by a ladies charity in Georgia. In 1996, then Georgia Governor Zell Miller attended Oglethorpe tercentenary festivities in Godalming and at Corpus Christi College, Oxford.

Corpus Christi College holds two portraits of Oglethorpe, a drawing of the general as an old man, which hangs in the Senior Common Room, and a portrait in oils, which hangs in the Breakfast Room.

== In literature ==
James Oglethorpe features as a character in John Buchan's novel Midwinter (1923).

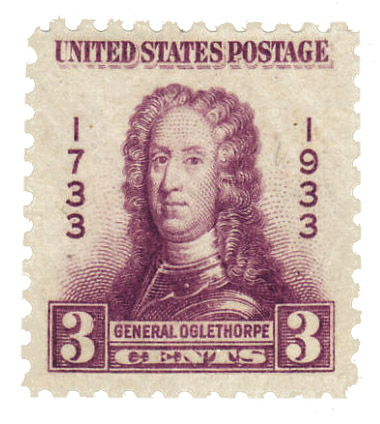
Postage stamp, United States, 1933

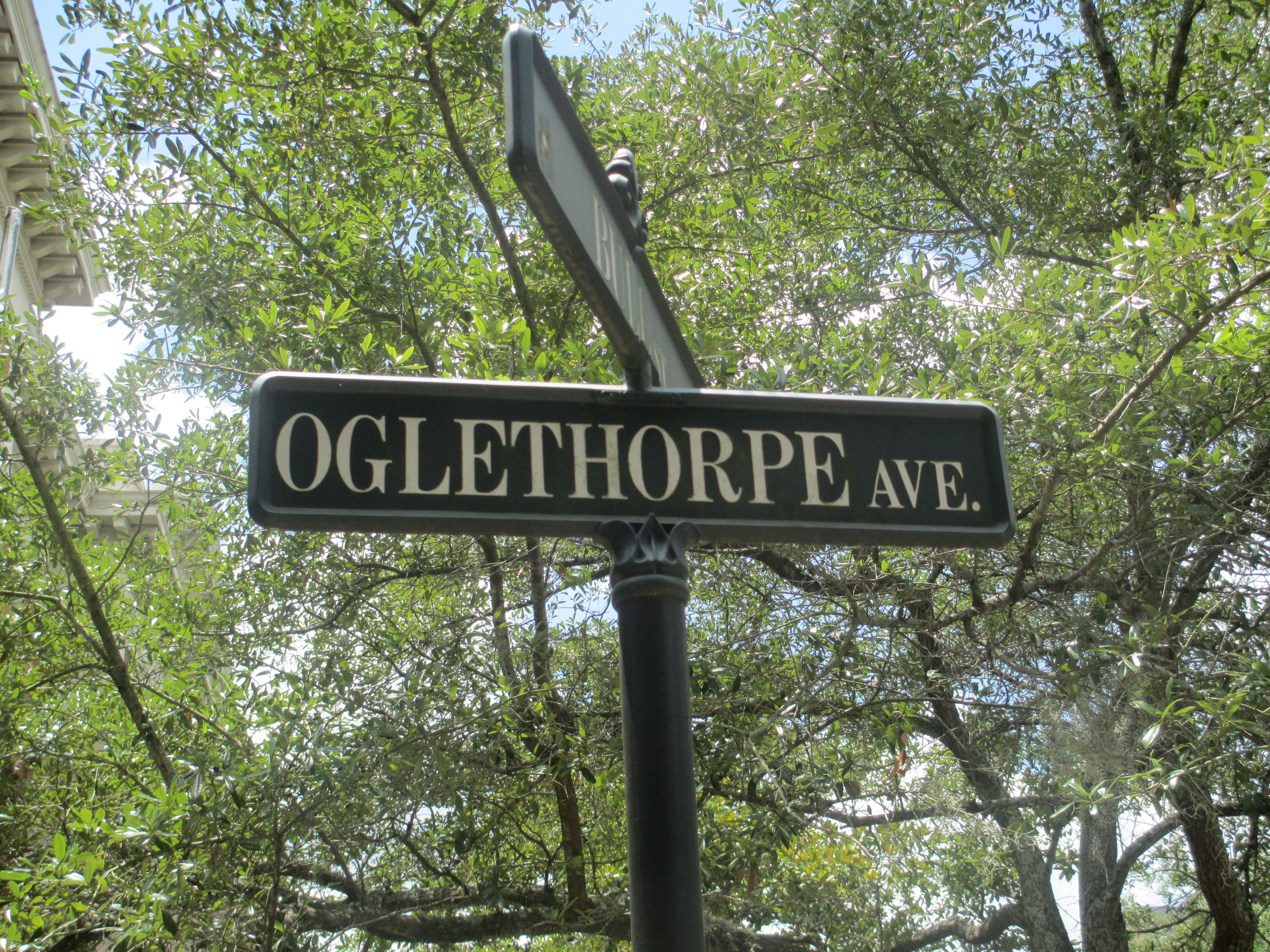
Oglethorpe Avenue sign in Savannah

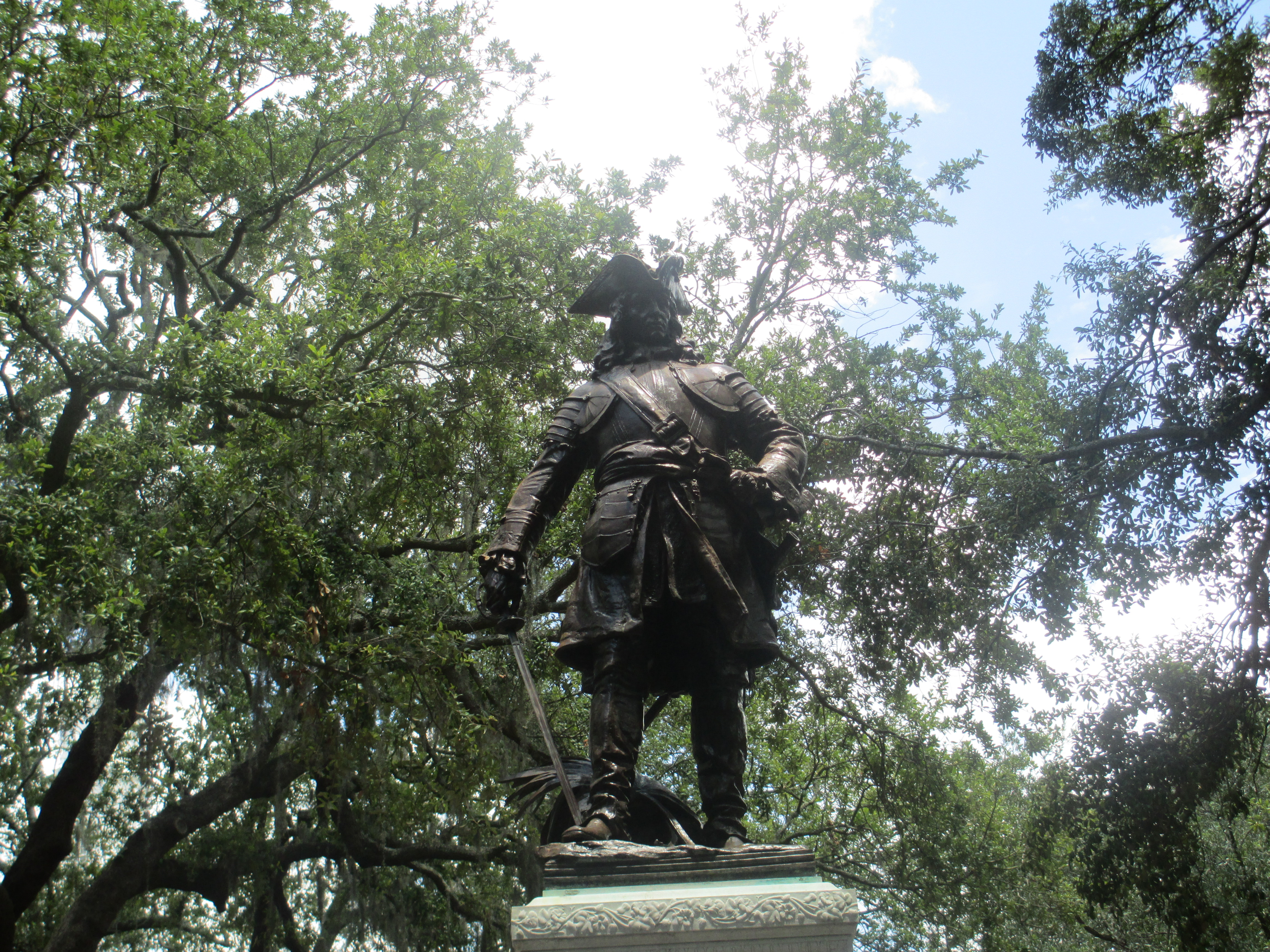
Oglethorpe statue in Chippewa Square

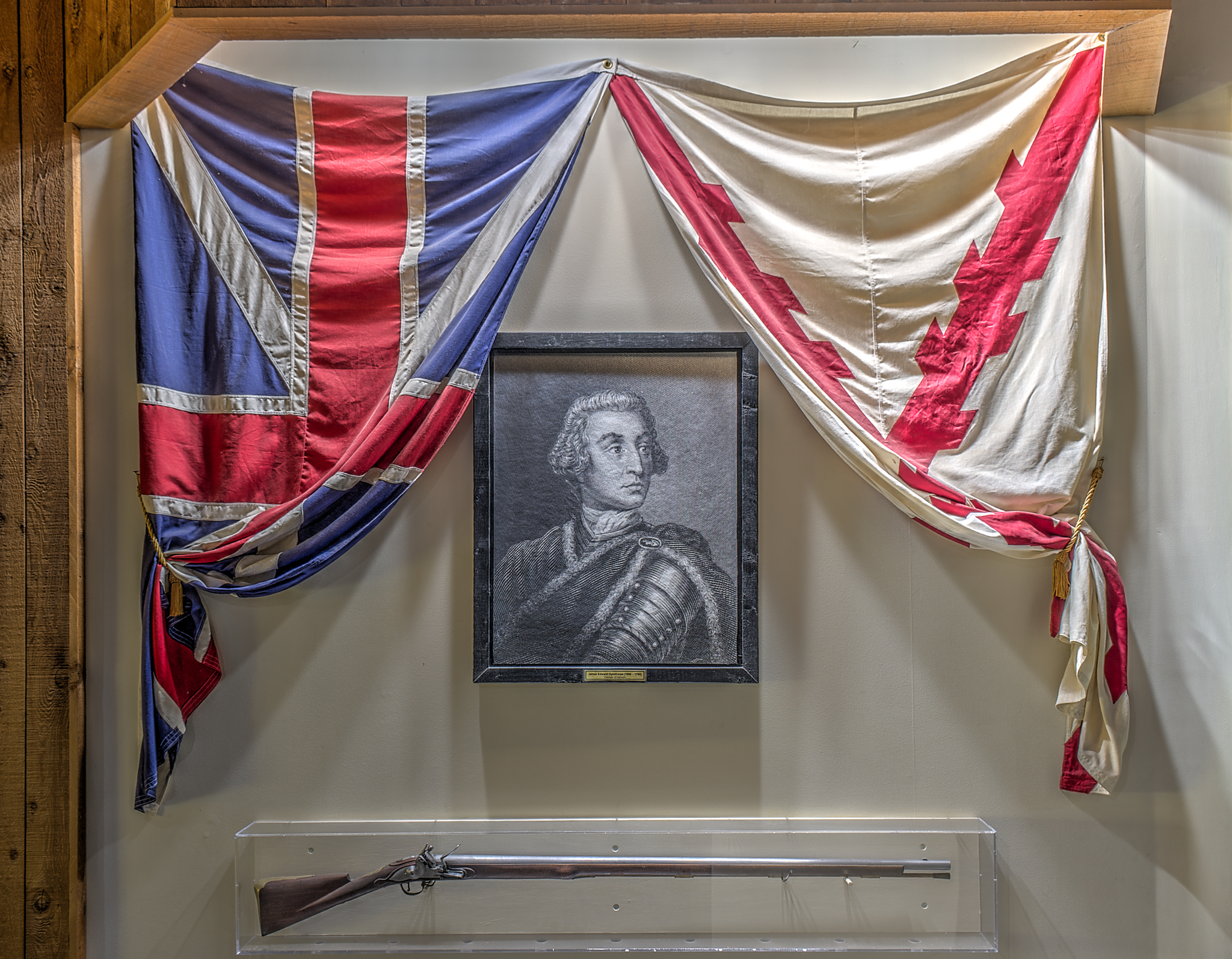
Portrait of Oglethorpe at Wormsloe

== See also ==
- Dungeness

== Sources ==
=== Books ===
- Axtell, James (1997). The Indians' New South: Cultural Change in the Colonial Southeast. Louisiana State University Press. ISBN 978-0-8071-4222-6.
- Ettinger, A.A.; Spalding, P. (1984). Oglethorpe, a Brief Biography. Mercer. ISBN 978-0-86554-110-8.
- Ivers, Larry E. (1974). British drums on the southern frontier : the military colonization of Georgia, 1733–1749. Chapel Hill: University of North Carolina Press. ISBN 0-8078-1211-0. OCLC 605775.
- Judy, Ronald A. T. (1993). (Dis)forming the American Canon: African-Arabic Slave Narratives and the Vernacular. U of Minnesota Press. ISBN 978-1-4529-0144-2.
- Spalding, Phinizy; Jackson, Harvey H. (2009). Oglethorpe in Perspective: Georgia's Founder after Two Hundred Years. The University of Alabama Press. ISBN 978-0-8173-8230-8.
  - De Vorsey Jr., Louis (2009). "Oglethorpe and the Earliest Maps of Georgia". Oglethorpe in Perspective: Georgia's Founder after Two Hundred Years. The University of Alabama Press. pp. 22–43. ISBN 978-0-8173-8230-8.
  - "Parson and Squire: James Oglethorpe and the Role of the Anglican Church in Georgia, 1733–1736". Oglethorpe in Perspective: Georgia's Founder after Two Hundred Years. The University of Alabama Press. 2009. pp. 44–65. ISBN 978-0-8173-8230-8.
  - "James Edward Oglethorpe, Race, and Slavery: A Reassessment". Oglethorpe in Perspective: Georgia's Founder after Two Hundred Years. The University of Alabama Press. 2009. pp. 66–79. ISBN 978-0-8173-8230-8.
  - "Oglethorpe, William Stephens, and the Origin of Georgia Politics". Oglethorpe in Perspective: Georgia's Founder after Two Hundred Years. The University of Alabama Press. 2009. pp. 80–98. ISBN 978-0-8173-8230-8.
  - "Oglethorpe's Contest for the Backcountry, 1733–1749". Oglethorpe in Perspective: Georgia's Founder after Two Hundred Years. The University of Alabama Press. 2009. pp. 99–111. ISBN 978-0-8173-8230-8.
  - Baine, Rodney M.; Williams, Mary E. (2009). "James Oglethorpe in Europe: Recent Findings in His Military Life". Oglethorpe in Perspective: Georgia's Founder after Two Hundred Years. The University of Alabama Press. pp. 112–121. ISBN 978-0-8173-8230-8.
  - "Oglethorpe and James Wright: A Georgia Comparison". Oglethorpe in Perspective: Georgia's Founder after Two Hundred Years. The University of Alabama Press. 2009. pp. 122–130. ISBN 978-0-8173-8230-8.
  - "The Search for Authentic Icons of James Edward Oglethorpe". Oglethorpe in Perspective: Georgia's Founder after Two Hundred Years. The University of Alabama Press. 2009. pp. 131–191. ISBN 978-0-8173-8230-8.
- Wilson, Thomas D. (2015). The Oglethorpe Plan: Enlightenment Design in Savannah and Beyond. University of Virginia Press. ISBN 978-0-8139-3711-3.

=== Journals ===
- Pitofsky, Alex (1 March 2000). "The Warden's Court Martial: James Oglethorpe and the Politics of Eighteenth-Century Prison Reform". Eighteenth-Century Life. 24 (1): 88–102. doi:10.1215/00982601-24-1-88. ISSN 1086-3192. S2CID 143263186.
- Baine, Rodney E. (2000). "General James Oglethorpe and the Expedition Against St. Augustine". The Georgia Historical Quarterly. 84 (2): 197–229. ISSN 0016-8297. JSTOR 40584271.
- Baine, Rodney M. (1988). "James Oglethorpe and the Early Promotional Literature for Georgia". The William and Mary Quarterly. 45 (1): 100–106. doi:10.2307/1922215. ISSN 0043-5597. JSTOR 1922215.
- Baine, Rodney M.; Williams, Mary E. (1985). "Oglethorpe's Early Military Campaigns". The Yale University Library Gazette. 60 (1/2): 63–76. ISSN 0044-0175. JSTOR 40858877.
- Baine, Rodney M. (1987). "James Oglethorpe and the Parliamentary Election of 1754". The Georgia Historical Quarterly. 71 (3): 451–460. ISSN 0016-8297. JSTOR 40581699.
- Baine, Rodney M. (1989). "The Prison Death of Robert Castell and its Effect on the Founding of Georgia". The Georgia Historical Quarterly. 73 (1): 67–78. ISSN 0016-8297. JSTOR 40581931.
- Baine, Rodney M.; Williams, Mary E. (1985). "Oglethorpe's Missing Years". The Georgia Historical Quarterly. 69 (2): 193–210. ISSN 0016-8297. JSTOR 40581354.
- Sweet, Julie Anne (2007). "The British Sailors' Advocate: James Oglethorpe's First Philanthropic Venture". The Georgia Historical Quarterly. 91 (1): 1–27. ISSN 0016-8297. JSTOR 40584953.
- Cole, Richard C. (1990). "James Oglethorpe as Revolutionary Propagandist: The Case of Corsica, 1768". The Georgia Historical Quarterly. 74 (3): 463–474. ISSN 0016-8297. JSTOR 40582191.
- Lannen, Andrew C. (2011). "James Oglethorpe and the Civil-Military Contest for Authority in Colonial Georgia, 1732–1749". The Georgia Historical Quarterly. 95 (2): 203–231. ISSN 0016-8297. JSTOR 41304287.
- Cashin, Edward J. (1992). "James Oglethorpe's Account of the 1745 Escape of the Scots at Shap". The Georgia Historical Quarterly. 76 (1): 87–99. ISSN 0016-8297. JSTOR 40582474.
- Hudson, Paul Stephen (1996). "The "Vexed Question" on the Birthday of James Edward Oglethorpe: A Tricentennial Review". The Georgia Historical Quarterly. 80 (2): 342–357. ISSN 0016-8297. JSTOR 40583440.
- Spalding, Phinizy (1972). "James Edward Oglethorpe: A Biographical Survey". The Georgia Historical Quarterly. 56 (3): 332–348. ISSN 0016-8297. JSTOR 40579423.
- Wilkins, Thomas Hart (2004). "James Edward Oglethorpe: South Carolina Slaveholder?". The Georgia Historical Quarterly. 88 (1): 85–94. ISSN 0016-8297. JSTOR 40584707.
- Spalding, Phinizy (1974). "Myths and the Man: James Edward Oglethorpe". The Georgia Review. 28 (1): 52–57. ISSN 0016-8386. JSTOR 41397041.
- Spalding, Phinizy (1994). "Oglethorpe, Georgia, and The Spanish Threat". The Georgia Historical Quarterly. 78 (3): 461–470. ISSN 0016-8297. JSTOR 40583083.
- Sweet, Julie Anne (2011). "Oglethorpe on America: Georgia's Founder's Thoughts on Independence". The Georgia Historical Quarterly. 95 (1): 1–20. ISSN 0016-8297. JSTOR 41304166.
- Boys, Richard C. (1947). "General Oglethorpe and the Muses". The Georgia Historical Quarterly. 31 (1): 19–29. ISSN 0016-8297. JSTOR 40577048.
- Spalding, Phinizy (1973). "The Death of James Edward Oglethorpe". The Georgia Historical Quarterly. 57 (2): 227–234. ISSN 0016-8297. JSTOR 40579518.
- Wilkins, Thomas Hart (2007). "Sir Joseph Jekyll and his Impact on Oglethorpe's Georgia". The Georgia Historical Quarterly. 91 (2): 119–134. ISSN 0016-8297. JSTOR 40584994.
- Weaver, Jace (2011). "The Red Atlantic: Transoceanic Cultural Exchanges". American Indian Quarterly. 35 (3): 418–463. doi:10.5250/amerindiquar.35.3.0418. ISSN 0095-182X. JSTOR 10.5250/amerindiquar.35.3.0418. S2CID 162829945.

Parliament of Great Britain
| Preceded by Nicholas Carew; Peter Burrell | Member of Parliament for Haslemere; 1722 – 1754; With: Peter Burrell | Succeeded by James More Molyneux; Philip Carteret Webb |
