= Battle of Flint River =

1702 battle of Queen Anne's War

- Part of Queen Anne's War
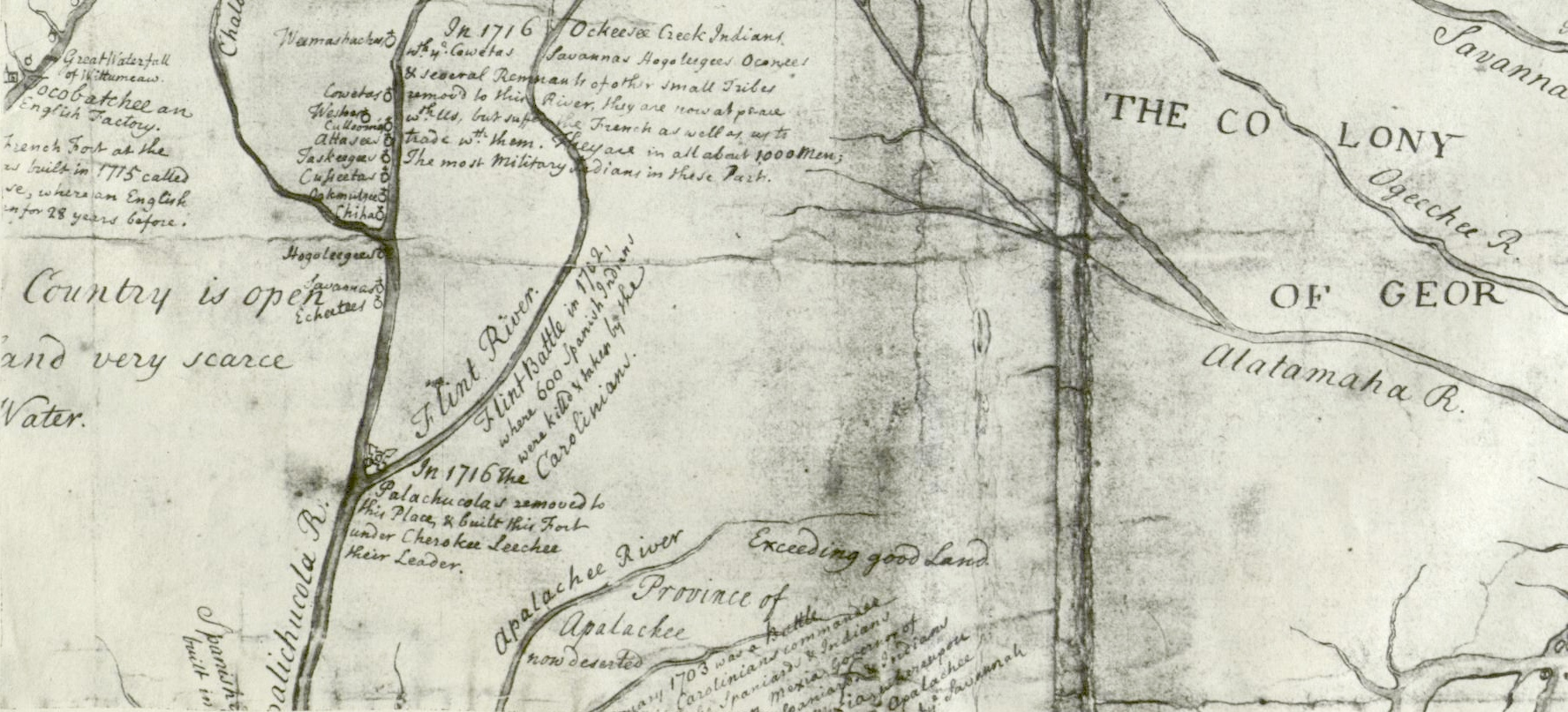
- This detail of an early 18th-century map shows the approximate location of the battle on the Flint River.
Date	unknown; between October 7 and 18, 1702
Location	present-day western Georgia
Result	English and allied victory

Belligerents
(Spain) Pro-Bourbon Spain Apalachee	England: Province of Carolina; Creek; Apalachicola Province

Commanders and leaders
Francisco Romo de Uriza	Anthony Dodsworth

Strength
800, mostly Indian	400, mostly Indian

Casualties and losses
most killed or captured	unknown

The Battle of Flint River, also called the Spanish-Indian Battle (1702) or the Battle of the Blankets , was a failed attack by Spanish and Apalachee Indian forces against Creek Indians in October 1702 in what is now the state of Georgia. The battle was a major element in ongoing frontier hostilities between English colonists from the Province of Carolina and Spanish Florida, and it was a prelude to more organized military actions of Queen Anne's War.

The Creeks, assisted by a small number of English colonists led by trader Anthony Dodsworth, ambushed the invaders on the banks of the Flint River. More than half of the Spanish-Indian force was killed or captured. English and Spanish colonial authorities reacted to the battle by accelerating preparations that culminated in the siege of St. Augustine in November 1702.

== Background ==
English and Spanish colonization efforts in South-eastern North America began coming into conflict as early as the middle of the 17th century. The founding of the Province of Carolina in 1663 and Charles Town in 1670 by English colonists significantly raised tensions with the Spanish who had long been established in Florida. Merchants and slavers from the new province penetrated into Spanish Florida, leading to raiding and reprisal expeditions on both sides. In 1700, governor of Carolina Joseph Blake threatened the Spanish that English claims to Pensacola, established by the Spanish in 1698, would be enforced. Carolina-based merchants such as Anthony Dodsworth and Thomas Nairne had established alliances with Creek Indians in the upper watersheds of rivers draining into the Gulf of Mexico, whom they supplied with arms and from whom they purchased slaves and animal pelts.

The Spanish population of Florida at the time was fairly small. Since its founding in the 16th century, the Spanish had established a network of missions whose primary purpose was to subdue the local Indian population and convert them to Roman Catholicism. In the Apalachee region (roughly present-day western Florida and southwestern Georgia) there were 14 mission communities with a total population in 1680 of about 8,000. Many, but not all, of these communities were populated by the Apalachee; others were from different tribes that had migrated southward to the area. The Spanish had a policy of not arming these Indians with firearms, and Spanish missions for the Apalachee began to be targeted by Carolinian raiders and their Creek allies starting from 1701.

In January 1702, French naval officer and founder of Mobile Pierre Le Moyne d'Iberville encouraged the Spanish commander at Pensacola to equip the Apalachee with firearms in order to prevent further raids from Carolina into Florida. D'Iberville went so far as to offer equipment and supplies for that purpose. Following the destruction by Carolinian raiders of the Timucuan mission of Santa Fé de Toloca in May 1702, governor of Spanish Florida Joseph de Zúñiga y Zérda authorized an expedition into the Creek territories.

== Battle ==
Zúñiga ordered Don Francisco Romo de Uriza, a Spanish captain, to San Luis de Apalachee, where he raised a force of about 800 Apalachee and Spanish from the surrounding mission communities. Uriza's report has not been found, so a breakdown of his force is not presently known. Word of this reached the Apalachicola Province community of Achita, where Carolina trader Anthony Dodsworth (referred to in Spanish documents as "Don Antonio") was meeting with the local tribes. According to a report an Indian woman made to Manuel Solano, the deputy governor at San Luis, about 400 warriors, principally Apalachicolas and Chiscas, went with Dodsworth, two other white men, and two blacks, to meet Uriza's force. They left Achita on roughly October 7, the same day Uriza left Apalachee. The exact date of the battle is unknown; the woman reporting to Solana saw the battlefield on October 18, the day Uriza and the remnants of his force returned to the Apalachee town of Bacacua.

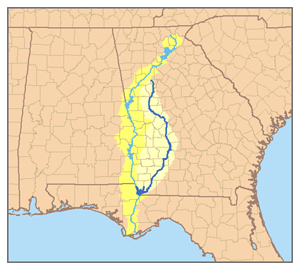
A modern map of Georgia highlighting the Flint River and its watershed. The Flint River is in dark blue, and the Chattahoochee River is in light blue.

Dodsworth assembled his force, which numbered about 500, with the blessing of the Apalachicola chief Emperor Brim. The two forces met near the Flint River when the Apalachee made a predawn attack on the Apalachicola camp. Anticipating the possibility of this sort of attack, Dodsworth and the Apalachicolas had arranged their blankets to appear occupied and concealed themselves near the camp. When the Apalachee attacked the false camp, the Apalachicolas fell upon them. With the superiority of their weapons, the English-allied Indians routed the Spanish force. Uriza was reported to have only 300 men when he returned to Apalachee.

== Aftermath ==
The defeat immediately put Zúñiga on the defensive. He ordered the fort at San Luis to be completed and adequate supplies for a siege laid in. The battle further stirred up passions in Charles Town, where Governor James Moore had already secured approval for an expedition against St. Augustine after learning that war had formally been declared in Europe between England and Spain. His expedition departed Charles Town in November and failed in its objective, although Spanish missions in Guale Province were destroyed in the process. Moore, in 1704, led an expedition against the Apalachee missions that virtually wiped them out. By August 1706, "the Carolinians had destroyed everything in Spanish Florida from the Apalachicola to the St. Johns River", with St. Augustine becoming the only colonial settlement in Florida still under Spanish control.

Two widely separated highway markers have been erected in Georgia to commemorate the battle. The Georgia Historical Commission erected a highway marker in central Georgia at 31.960667°N 83.910967°W in Crisp County near Georgia Veterans State Park in 1965, and the Historic Chattahoochee Commission, in 1985, placed a marker at 30.913148°N 84.5672°W in the southern Georgia town of Bainbridge.
