= Siege of Pensacola (1707) =

Part of Queen Anne's War

Coordinates: 30°20′52″N 87°17′50″W

- Part of Queen Anne's War
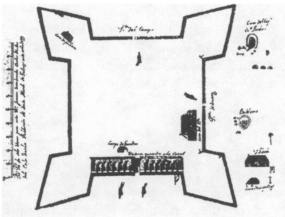
- Fort San Carlos de Austria, map from 1699
Date	First siege: 12–20 August 1707; Second siege: 28–30 November 1707
Location	Pensacola, Spanish Florida
Result	Spanish victory

Belligerents
Spain: New Spain	(Kingdom of Great Britain) Province of Carolina; Muskogee

Commanders and leaders
Don Sebastián de Moscoso	Unknown; second siege may have been led by Thomas Nairne

Strength
First siege: unknown, under 220; Second siege: about 300	First siege: several hundred Second siege: about 320

The siege of Pensacola included two separate attempts in 1707 by English-supported Creek Indians to capture the town and fortress of Pensacola, one of two major settlements (the other was St. Augustine) in Spanish Florida.

The attacks, part of Queen Anne's War (the North American theater of the War of the Spanish Succession), resulted in the burning of the town, and caused most of its Indian population to flee, although the fort withstood repeated attacks. The battles were primarily fought in the nighttime hours due to the excessive heat of the day.

The first siege, in August, resulted in the destruction of the town, but Fort San Carlos de Austria successfully resisted the onslaught. In late November, a second expedition arrived, and made unsuccessful attacks on three consecutive nights before withdrawing. Pensacola's governor, Don Sebastián de Moscoso, whose garrison was depleted by disease, recruited convicted criminals to assist in the fort's defense.

== Background ==
English and Spanish colonies in southeastern North America began coming into conflict as early as the middle of the 17th century. The Spanish population of Florida at the time was fairly small. Since its founding in the 16th century, the Spanish had set up a network of missions whose primary purpose was to pacify the local Indian population and convert them to Roman Catholicism. The founding by English colonists of 1670 of Charles Town (present-day Charleston, South Carolina) in the recently established (1663) Province of Carolina heightened tensions. By the early 18th century, Carolina traders like Anthony Dodsworth and Thomas Nairne had established alliances with Creek Indians in the upper watersheds of rivers draining into the Gulf of Mexico, who they supplied with arms and from whom they purchased slaves and animal pelts. These traders penetrated into Spanish Florida, leading to raiding and reprisal expeditions on both sides.

In 1700, Carolina's governor, Joseph Blake, threatened the Spanish that English claims to Pensacola, established by the Spanish in 1698, would be enforced. Pierre Le Moyne d'Iberville, the French founder of Mobile, in January 1702, warned the Spanish commander at Pensacola that he should properly arm the Apalachee Indians and engage in a vigorous defense against potential English incursions into Spanish territory. D'Iberville even offered equipment and supplies for that purpose. However, an attempt at a punitive expedition against the Creek resulted in a rout of the Spanish and their Apalachee allies in October, shortly before news of war declarations bringing the English government into the War of the Spanish Succession arrived. After a failed Carolinian assault on St. Augustine, Spanish mission towns were severely reduced by numerous raids by combined Creek-Carolina raids against the Spanish mission network from 1703 to 1706. A French-organized 1706 expedition against Charles Town was a failure but motivated Carolina authorities to again target the Spanish at Pensacola and the French at Mobile. Nairne proposed a major expedition after the attack on Charles Town, intending to recruit as many as 1,500 Indians to capture Mobile, but political divisions in Carolina prevented execution of the plan.

== First siege ==
In 1707, Pensacola was under the command of Don Sebastián de Moscoso. The exact size of his garrison in 1707 is not known. The authorized strength of the garrison was 220, but it rarely reached that strength owing to the difficulty in recruiting soldiers, for what was viewed as a highly undesirable posting, and a fairly high rate of desertion. Moscoso reported in 1708 that the garrison numbered about 100, having been reduced by the events of 1707. The garrison was housed in Fort San Carlos de Austria, a wooden stockade fort built in 1698.

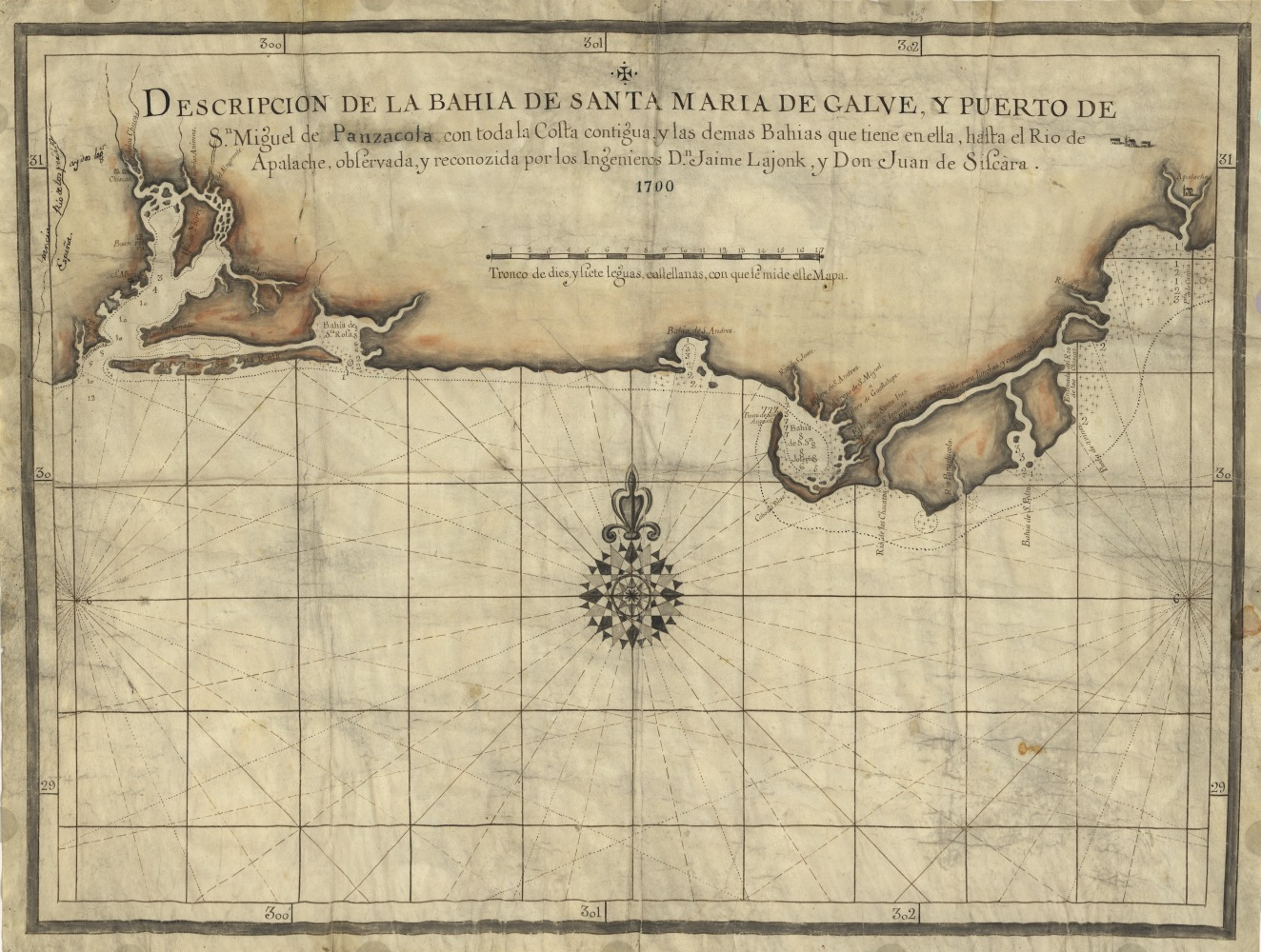
Spanish map of the Florida Gulf coast, 1700

Extant records do not describe the composition of the forces that attacked Pensacola in August beyond "several hundred Tallapoosas and a few South Carolina traders". The siege began on 12 August with the arrival of a band of 20 to 30 Indians, who began terrorizing the Indians living in the town outside the fort. They took prisoners (including some women and children) and began burning houses. Governor Moscoso fired one of the fort's cannons, scattering the attackers; some of their captives managed to escape to the fort in the confusion. Two days later, ten men sent out of the fort to do laundry disappeared. On 14 August an estimated 300 Indians appeared before the fort and engaged it in a battle lasting several hours. The next day the attack resumed, as did the pillaging of the town. Activity quieted down until 18 August, when an English flag was raised over a house near the fort. This prompted Moscoso to open fire from the fort, beginning a battle that raged until dark. That day, the attackers burned down the rest of the town, and Moscoso's men had to work to prevent the fort from burning as well.

While the Spanish inspected the rubble, one of them was taken prisoner on 19 August and a second person was captured the next day. This marked the end of active assaults on the fort. However, the area beyond the range of the fort's guns was unsafe for at least the next month; a number of people also disappeared after they ventured too far from its vicinity.

== Second siege ==
The second siege began with the arrival on 27 November of a contingent of about 20 Carolina traders and 300 Creeks, primarily Tallapoosas and Alabamas. On that day, a Carolinian (unidentified in Spanish reports, but possibly Thomas Nairne) brought a demand for surrender written in English. Since none of the Spaniards could read it, he was sent away, and the demand was eventually transmitted orally by a French Huguenot. Moscoso rejected the demand, even though his garrison was depleted by disease. The besiegers began an ineffectual attack on the fort around midnight which lasted until daybreak, at which point they delivered a final surrender demand which Moscoso again refused. In order to supplement his forces, he successfully recruited convicts being held in the fort's guardhouse to participate in the defense, offering them freedom and money for their service. During each of the next two nights the besiegers renewed their attacks on the fort, without significant effect. During the night of 29/30 November, one of the leading Creek chiefs was killed. This apparently broke the besiegers' morale, for the siege was lifted the following morning. The attackers were reported to have suffered significant casualties.

Word of the attacking force had reached the French at Mobile on 24 November. Governor Jean-Baptiste Le Moyne de Bienville raised a force of 100 Frenchmen and 400 Indians. They reached Pensacola on 8 December, only to learn that the siege had been lifted a week earlier.

== Aftermath ==
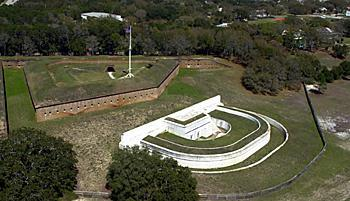
Aerial view of Fort Barrancas

These attacks were the last major assaults on Pensacola in the war, although there continued to be minor skirmishes and kidnappings. Most of the Indians that fled during the sieges never returned, reducing Pensacola to little more than its garrison. Governor Bienville learned from a Spaniard who had escaped English captivity that Mobile was also being targeted for attack. He improved Mobile's defenses in 1708, but the outpost was never attacked; a village of Mobile Indians was attacked in May 1709, however.

A French force from Mobile captured Pensacola from the Spanish in 1719, during the War of the Quadruple Alliance, but it was returned to Spain after the war. The location of Fort San Carlos de Austria is now occupied by Fort Barrancas, a National Historic Landmark whose construction began late in the 18th century.
