= Battle of Pensacola =

Battle of Pensacola may refer to:

- Siege of Pensacola (1707), two separate siege attempts during Queen Anne's War by English-led Indians against a Spanish garrison
- Capture of Pensacola (1719), the capture of Spanish Pensacola by French forces during the War of the Quadruple Alliance
- Siege of Pensacola, a 1781 siege by Spanish forces against a British garrison during the American War of Independence
- Battle of Pensacola (1814), an American attack on a British-Spanish force during the War of 1812
- Battle of Pensacola (1861), a Union attack on Confederate forts in Pensacola Bay during American Civil War
