= Mission San Luis =

Mission San Luis may refer to:

- Mission San Luis de Apalachee, in Florida
- Mission San Luis Obispo de Tolosa, in San Luis Obispo, California
- Mission San Luis Rey de Francia, in Oceanside, California
