= Presidio Santa Maria de Galve =

Spanish settlement in Florida

Presidio Santa María de Galve
- Former settlement
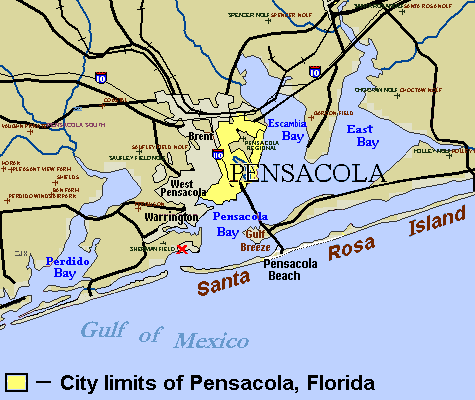
- Pensacola: Site of 1698 settlement near Fort Barrancas is marked "X" (above left end of Santa Rosa Island).

- Location within Florida
- Coordinates: 30°20′00″N 87°08′15″W
- Country: New Spain
- Territory: (Spain) Spanish Florida
- Founded: 1698-1707

The Presidio Santa María de Galve, founded in 1698 by Spanish colonists, was the first European settlement of Pensacola, Florida after that of Tristan de Luna in 1559–1561. It was in the area of Fort Barrancas at modern-day Naval Air Station Pensacola, in northwestern Florida. The presidio included Fort San Carlos de Austria and an adjacent village.

== History ==
French expansion down the Mississippi River late in the 17th century spurred the Spanish government to protect its interests along the northern coast of the Gulf of Mexico. The Viceroy and Audencia of New Spain established the Presidio Santa María de Galve in 1698 to protect the western approaches to Spanish Florida, which at the time exercised effective control over an area from the Atlantic coast to the Apalachicola River. The French threat quickly materialized, with Fort Maurepas (near present-day Biloxi, Mississippi) established in 1699, and Mobile (now in Alabama) in 1702. The village was abandoned and burned in August 1707 when a force of English (from the Province of Carolina) and Tallapoosas attacked the settlement. The Spanish held onto the fort then, and when it was attacked again in November. The Tallapoosas, with English support, maintained pressure on the fort for eight years, raiding and capturing more than 70 Spaniards they found outside the fort during that period. In 1715 the Tallapoosas broke their alliance with the English and established friendly relations with the Spanish at Fort San Carlos de Austria. A new village was established after the siege ended. In May 1719, during the War of the Quadruple Alliance, the French attacked Santa María de Galve. The Spanish surrendered Fort San Carlos de Austria after a five-hour battle. The Spanish recaptured the fort in August of that year, but lost it again to French forces the next month. The French held the presidio for three years, until the area around Pensacola Bay was returned to Spain by treaty in 1722. The French burned the fort and village before leaving. With the loss of Santa María de Galve in 1719, Spain moved the seat of government for West Florida to the Presidio Bahía de San José, on the northern end of the St. Joseph Peninsula. The Spanish did not return to the site of Santa María de Galve in 1722, instead establishing the Presidio Isla Santa Rosa Punta de Sigüenza on Santa Rosa Island as the seat of government of West Florida, where it remained for 33 years. That presidio was abandoned in 1755, when the Presidio San Miguel de Panzacola was established on the mainland.

== Fort San Carlos de Austria ==
Presidio Santa Maria de Galve
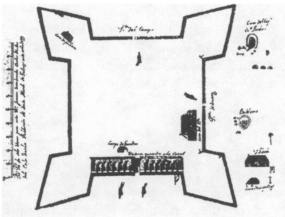
- A 1699 Spanish drawing of Fort San Carlos de Austria

Site information
- Type: Fortification
- Owner: Spanish Empire
- Controlled by: New Spain

Location
- Location within Florida
- Coordinates: 30.3471°N 87.2972°W

Site history
- Built: 1698
- In use: 1698-1719 (Spain); 1719 (France)
- Materials: Wood logs
- Fate: Destroyed
- Demolished: 1719
- Battles/wars: War of the Quadruple Alliance

The principal structure of the presidio was the Fort San Carlos de Austria, measuring 100 by 100 varas (the length of a vara varied, but was generally somewhat less than a metre). The walls of the fort were three varas high. The fort was surrounded by a 3.3-foot (1.0 m) deep moat. The walls of the fort were originally built of pine logs laid horizontally against upright posts, with the space between the inner and outer walls filled with sand. The humid climate and constant contact with sand quickly rotted the logs, and by 1707 most of the fort walls had been replaced by vertical logs. The settlement was struck by several hurricanes in the two decades of its existence, eroding the bluff below the fort and requiring shoring up of the structure. The wall on the south side of the fort, closest to the water, was eventually rebuilt behind its original position, distorting the symmetry of the fort.

Structures inside the fort were a church, hospital, warehouse, governor's house, and three barracks, one each for officers, soldiers, and convict laborers. As there was no local source of stone suitable for building, and no brick kilns, all of the structures were built of wood. The walls and roofs of the structures were at first made of palmetto thatch. Lead-sheeting or shingle roofs and plank walls were added later to the more important buildings. Some of the buildings had solid floors, others had dirt floors.

The site of Santa Maria de Galve has been investigated by archaeologists with the University of West Florida.
