= Benjamin Blake (admiral) =

English naval officer (1612–1689)

Vice Admiral Benjamin Blake
- Blake Family Coat of Arms

Deputy in the Governors Council of the Province of Carolina
- In office 1685–1689

Lord Proprietors' Deputy on the Grand Council of Carolina
- In office 1685–1689

Province of Carolina Commissioner for Public Defense
- In office 1686–1689

Personal details
- Born: 21 May 1612 Bridgwater, Somersetshire, Kingdom of England
- Died: 1689 (aged 76–77) Colleton County, Province of Carolina
- Spouse: Eliza Booler (1614–1676)
- Children: 7, including Joseph Blake
- Occupation: Naval Officer; Settler; Politician; Colonist; Planter

Military service
- Allegiance: Commonwealth of England; The Protectorate; Kingdom of England; Province of Carolina
- Branch/service: New Model Army; English Navy
- Years of service: 1642–1657
- Rank: Lieutenant (Parliamentarian Army); Commander (Royal Navy); Captain (Royal Navy); Vice Admiral (Royal Navy)
- Commands: HMS Paradox; HMS Assurance; HMS Triumph; HMS Gloucester; HMS Dunbar
- Battles/wars: English Civil War; Siege of Bridgwater (1645); First Anglo-Dutch War; Blockade of the Tagus; Battle of Dover (1652); Battle of Kentish Knock; Battle of Dungeness; Battle of Portland; Battle of the Gabbard; Battle of Scheveningen; Anglo-Spanish War (1654-1660); Battle of Cádiz (1656); Battle of Santa Cruz de Tenerife (1657); 1686 Spanish Invasion of South Carolina

Benjamin Blake (1612–1689) was an English naval officer who served under his older brother General at Sea Robert Blake during the English Civil War, the First Anglo-Dutch War, and the Anglo-Spanish War (1654-1660). After his naval service, he emigrated to the Province of Carolina where he and his family became planters and he himself became a local official.

== Early life ==
Benjamin Blake was born in Bridgwater, England, to Humphrey Blake II (1563–1625) and Sarah Williams (1575–1683), being one of thirteen children. His elder brother Robert Blake led him into military service during the English Civil War in 1642.

== Military career ==
Blake's early military career included service alongside his brother in the English Civil War as an army officer. During his career he served at the Siege of Bridgwater (1645). By 1647 he was transferred to the navy at the sponsorship of his brother, and given command of the fifth-rate HMS Paradox by 1649. He was subsequently given command of the fourth-rate HMS Assurance in 1650, serving in squadrons under his brother, Robert Blake. In an engagement off Lisbon that year he reportedly engaged a Portuguese vice‑admiral, boarding and sinking the vessel. By September 1652, Blake had been promoted to captain the HMS Triumph, one of the larger warships in the Commonwealth fleet. He saw action in the First Anglo‑Dutch War, including the Battle of Kentish Knock. However, after the Battle of Dungeness, in which the Commonwealth fleet was defeated, Benjamin was briefly discharged from command amid allegations of neglect of duty by his brother. His brother accused him of not fighting hard enough at Dungeness. Although eventually acquitted, he did not immediately return to sea. In that time its possible his brother made him serve aboard his own ship and the two sailed together.

In 1654, Blake was appointed captain of the Gloucester for the Western Design, a major expedition to the Caribbean led by Admiral William Penn and intended to project English influence and power into Spanish America. He served at and around the Battle of Cádiz (1656). He and his ship also fought at the Battle of Santa Cruz de Tenerife (1657), during which Blake’s disagreements with his superior led to his replacement before returning to England, where his brother died, and his influence in the navy was mostly lost.

== Immigration to South Carolina ==
In 1683, Blake left England and emigrated to the Province of Carolina as a leader of a large group of dissenters and soon to be planters. He settled in what would become Colleton County, where he received significant land grants, including the Plainsfield and Pawlets plantations. Blake soon emerged as a supporter of the proprietary government and the interests of John Archdale, serving as a Lords Proprietors’ deputy and member of the Grand Council of Carolina. He was appointed Clerk of the Crown and Peace in 1687 and served on committees responsible for the colony’s defense and constitutional revisions. After the 1686 Spanish Invasion of South Carolina and the burning of his son-in-laws home (Joseph Morton), he was commissioner for public defense and alongside Morton, planned a counterattack against the Spanish in Florida. This plan was soon throw-out in order to not cause a larger conflict.

== Later life ==
Blake died around 1689 in South Carolina, leaving several substantial estates and a legacy, to be carried on by his son, Joseph Blake, who became a prominent political figure and governor of the colony in the 1690s. His daughter married Joseph Morton (governor).
