= Siege of St. Augustine (1702) =

Part of Queen Anne's War

Coordinates: 29°53′52″N 81°18′41″W

- Part of Queen Anne's War
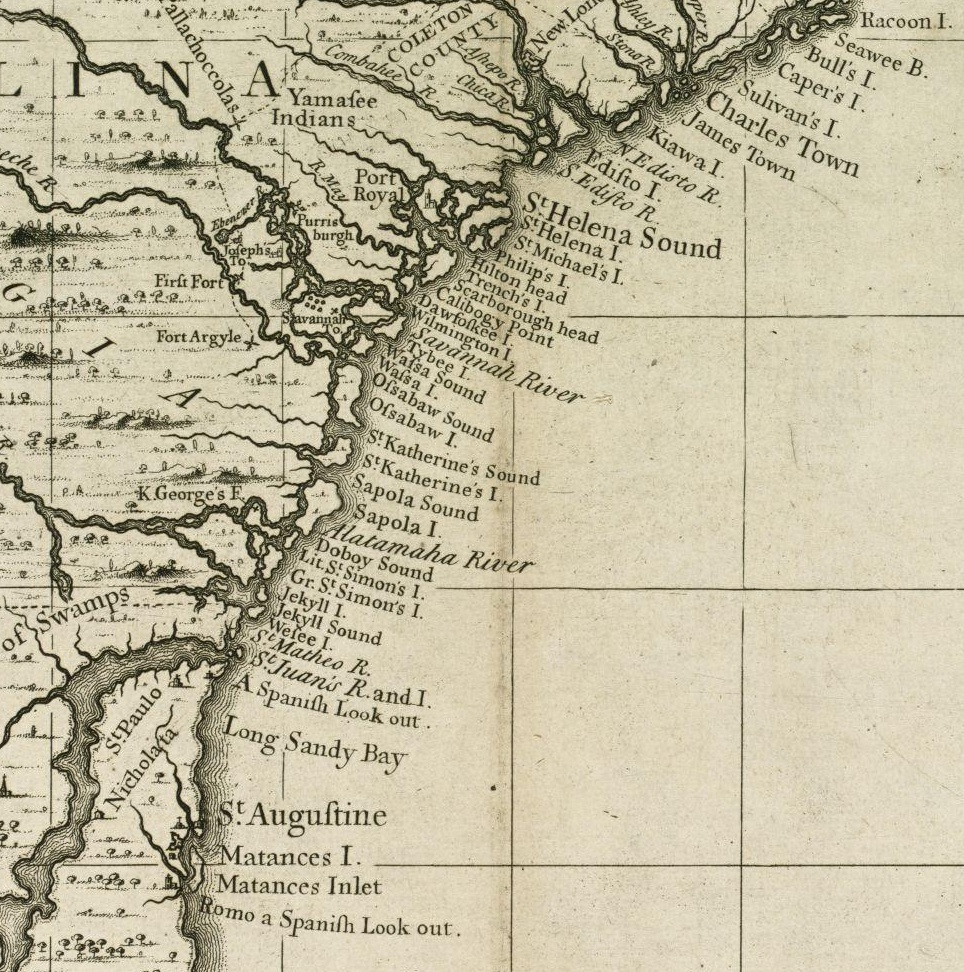
- Detail from a 1733 map showing the North American coastline between Charles Town and St. Augustine
Date	10 November – 30 December 1702
Location	St. Augustine, Spanish Florida
Result	Spanish victory

Belligerents
Kingdom of Spain: New Spain	Kingdom of England

Commanders and leaders
José de Zúñiga y la Cerda; Estevan de Berroa; Captain López de Solloso	James Moore

Strength
204 regulars and marines 1,500 civilians	500–600 provincial militia 300–600 Indians

Casualties and losses
Reports vary; light	Reports vary; light

The siege of St. Augustine occurred in Queen Anne's War during November and December 1702. It was conducted by English colonists from the Province of Carolina and their Indian allies, under the command of governor of Carolina James Moore, against the Spanish colonial fortress of Castillo de San Marcos at St. Augustine, in Spanish Florida.

After destroying coastal Spanish communities north of St. Augustine, Moore's forces arrived at St. Augustine on 10 November, and immediately began siege operations. The Spanish governor, José de Zúñiga y la Cerda, had advance warning of their arrival, and withdrew civilians and food supplies into the fortress, and also sent messengers to nearby Spanish and French communities for relief.

The English guns did little damage to the fortress walls, prompting Governor Moore to send an appeal to Jamaica for larger guns. The Spanish calls for relief were successful; a fleet sent from Havana, Cuba landed troops nearby on 29 December. Moore lifted the siege the next day, and was forced to burn many of his boats before retreating to Charles Town in disgrace.

== Background ==
English and Spanish colonization efforts in South-eastern North America began coming into conflict as early as the middle of the 17th century. The founding of the Province of Carolina in 1663 and Charles Town in 1670 by English colonists significantly raised tensions with the Spanish who had long been established in Florida. Merchants and slavers from the new province penetrated into Spanish Florida, leading to raiding and reprisal expeditions on both sides. In 1700, governor of Carolina Joseph Blake threatened the Spanish that English claims to Pensacola, established by the Spanish in 1698, would be enforced. Blake's death later that year interrupted these plans, and he was replaced in 1702 by James Moore.

Even before news of the war declarations opening the War of the Spanish Succession arrived in the colonies, Moore proposed an expedition against Spanish Florida's capital, St. Augustine. News of the war's formal opening arrived in 1702, and Moore convinced the provincial assembly in September 1702 to fund an expedition against St. Augustine. Moore raised a force of colonists and Indians, the latter a combination of Yamasee, Tallapoosa, and Alabama warriors, principally led by a Yamasee chief named Arratommakaw. The exact size of these forces varies by source; accounts provide numbers ranging from 800 to 1,200 in strength; most sources say that about 500 colonists and 300–400 Indians took part. Some of this force, primarily the Indians, went overland to Port Royal under the command of Deputy Governor Robert Daniell, while Moore embarked the rest of the force on 14 boats. These forces joined at Port Royal, and Daniell's force was landed on what is now known as Amelia Island (it was called Isla Santa Maria by the Spanish, and was part of Florida's Guale Province), while Moore sailed on to Matanzas Bay.

The Castillo de San Marcos at St. Augustine was built in the later years of the 17th century, in part because previous English raids demonstrated the inadequacy of wooden fortifications, and to address the threat posed by the founding of Charles Town. The fortress, a fairly conventional star fort, was constructed from soft coquina limestone. Governor Joseph de Zúñiga y Zérda assumed command of the post in 1700. Natives friendly to the Spanish heard of the recruitment, and word of the expedition reached Zúñiga on October 27. He ordered the town's inhabitants into the fort, commandeered all food stores in anticipation of an extended siege, and dispatched messengers to Pensacola, Havana, and the French at Mobile with calls for assistance. Refugees swelled the civilian population to about 1,500, of which only a small number were deemed capable of military action. Zúñiga estimated the food provisions brought in to be sufficient for a siege of three months' duration.

Some of Zúñiga's men wanted to do battle with the English; the governor identified, in addition to 174 regulars and 14 artillerymen, 44 Europeans from the population that were fit for action, 123 Indians (most armed with poor-quality or useless weapons), and 57 black men (freemen, mulattoes, and slaves) of which only 20 had any experience with weapons. Zúñiga did not consider either the Indians or the Negroes to be trustworthy, and estimated that only about 70 men of this entire force were actually prepared for a battle. He consequently prepared for a siege. His principal concern was the training of the artillerymen, of whom he wrote that they "had no service record, lacked discipline, and have only a slight knowledge of the ... guns which are mounted."

== Battle ==
=== English approach ===
Daniell's forces landed on Amelia Island, and began attacks on the northern end of the island at midnight on 3 November, killing two Spanish soldiers and overrunning the village of San Pedro de Tupiqui. They advanced south, driving southward a flood of refugees and the few Spanish troops on the island. The main settlements at San Felipe and San Marcos were overrun the next day, as the Spanish were in the process of evacuating them. Zúñiga learned of the advance on 5 November, and sent 20 men under Captain Joseph de Horruytiner north, with instructions to make a stand at San Juan del Puerto, seven leagues from St. Augustine, which Zúñiga saw as the "key to the province of Guale". The news also prompted Zúñiga to mobilize all able-bodied men over 14, and order all available food into the fort.

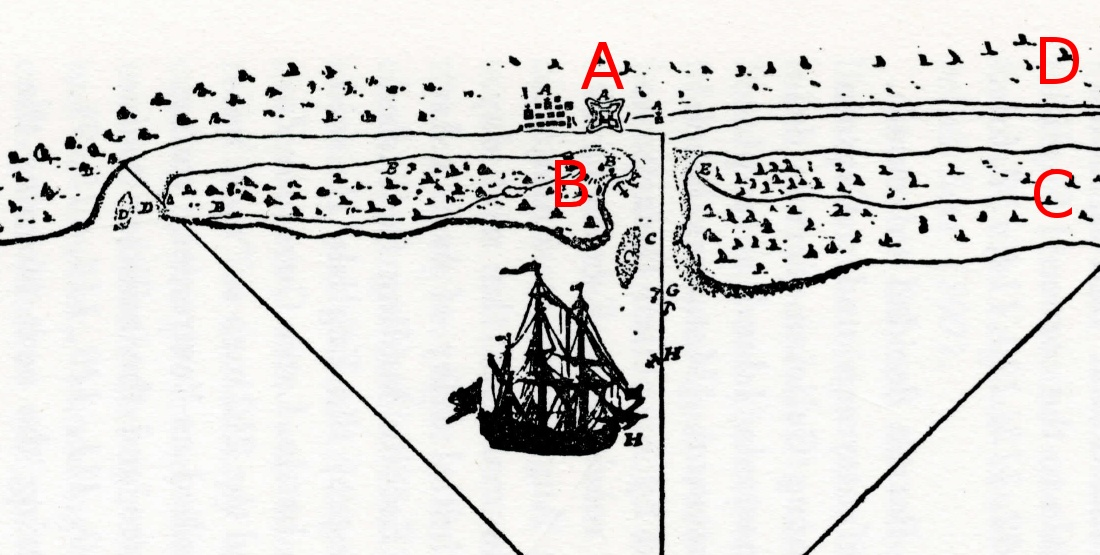
Detail from a period French map depicting the siege: * A: St. Augustine and the Castillo de San Marcos * B: Island where the English landed their boats, and where Spanish reinforcements arrived * C: Route by which James Moore retreated * D: Route by which Robert Daniell retreated

Horruytiner never made it beyond the St. Johns River; he did capture three enemy soldiers (two Englishmen and a Chiluque Indian) on 6 November, and returned with them to St. Augustine two days later. Zúñiga learned from these captives that the English had brought three months' provisions, and that they had only brought smaller cannons (6 to 10 pounders).

In the meantime, Moore sailed south with the fleet. Three ships were sent ahead of the main fleet to blockade the entrance to Matanzas Bay, south of St. Augustine. These were spotted from the fort on 7 November. The next day the main body of the fleet began arriving at the bar outside the St. Augustine inlet. This prompted Zúñiga to order his two frigates, La Gloria and Nuestra Señora de la Piedad y el Niño Jesús, to anchor under the fort's guns. The Nuestra, which was outside the bar, was unable to cross, and was eventually burned. Sixteen of her men joined the fort's garrison, providing valuable gunnery skills.

Daniell's force, after being landed, made good progress. The small Spanish force on Amelia Island was unable to check the English advance at San Juan del Puerto, and was dispersed; some of them took days to reach St. Augustine. Daniels continued to advance, and entered the town of St. Augustine without resistance on 10 November. Eight of the English ships crossed the bar and began landing men that day. As the English began to close the circle around the fortress, a Spanish foraging expedition successfully drove 163 head of cattle through the English lines and into the fort's (dry) moat.

=== Siege ===
The Spanish guns opened fire on the English as they began siege preparations on 10 November. One of the older Spanish cannon exploded that day, killing three and wounding five. A few days later, Zúñiga ordered a sally to destroy portions of the town within firing range of the fort; according to later accounts, this action destroyed more than 15,000 pesos worth of property.

Moore had brought four small cannon, but these made little impression on the coquina walls of the fortress, and the Spanish guns had longer range, keeping most of his forces at bay. Around November 22, Moore dispatched Deputy Governor Daniell to Jamaica for larger cannons and ammunition. The English continued digging siege trenches, and began firing on the fortress from musket range on November 24. This cannon fire continued to have little effect, and Moore ordered more of the town torched the next day, including the Franciscan monastery.

Since his cannon were not effective against the fort's walls, Moore attempted a deception to gain entry to the fort. On 14 December a Yamasee couple managed to gain entry to the fort posing as refugees, apparently with the goal of detonating the fort's powder magazine. However, Zúñiga was suspicious of their behavior and, according to his account of the siege, they were tortured into admitting the plot.

By 19 December the English trenches had closed on the fort to the point that they threatened nearby fields from which the Spanish had been collecting forage. As a result, Zúñiga ordered a sally. There was a skirmish, and Spanish casualties were light: one killed and several wounded.

=== Relief attempts ===
Spanish leaders at San Luis de Apalachee (present-day Tallahassee, Florida) began mobilizing when they received the news of the siege. Short on supplies, they appealed to the French at Mobile, who provided critical guns and gunpowder; the Pensacola garrison also spared ten men. The relief force left San Luis de Apalachee on December 24, but turned back when news was received that the siege had been lifted.

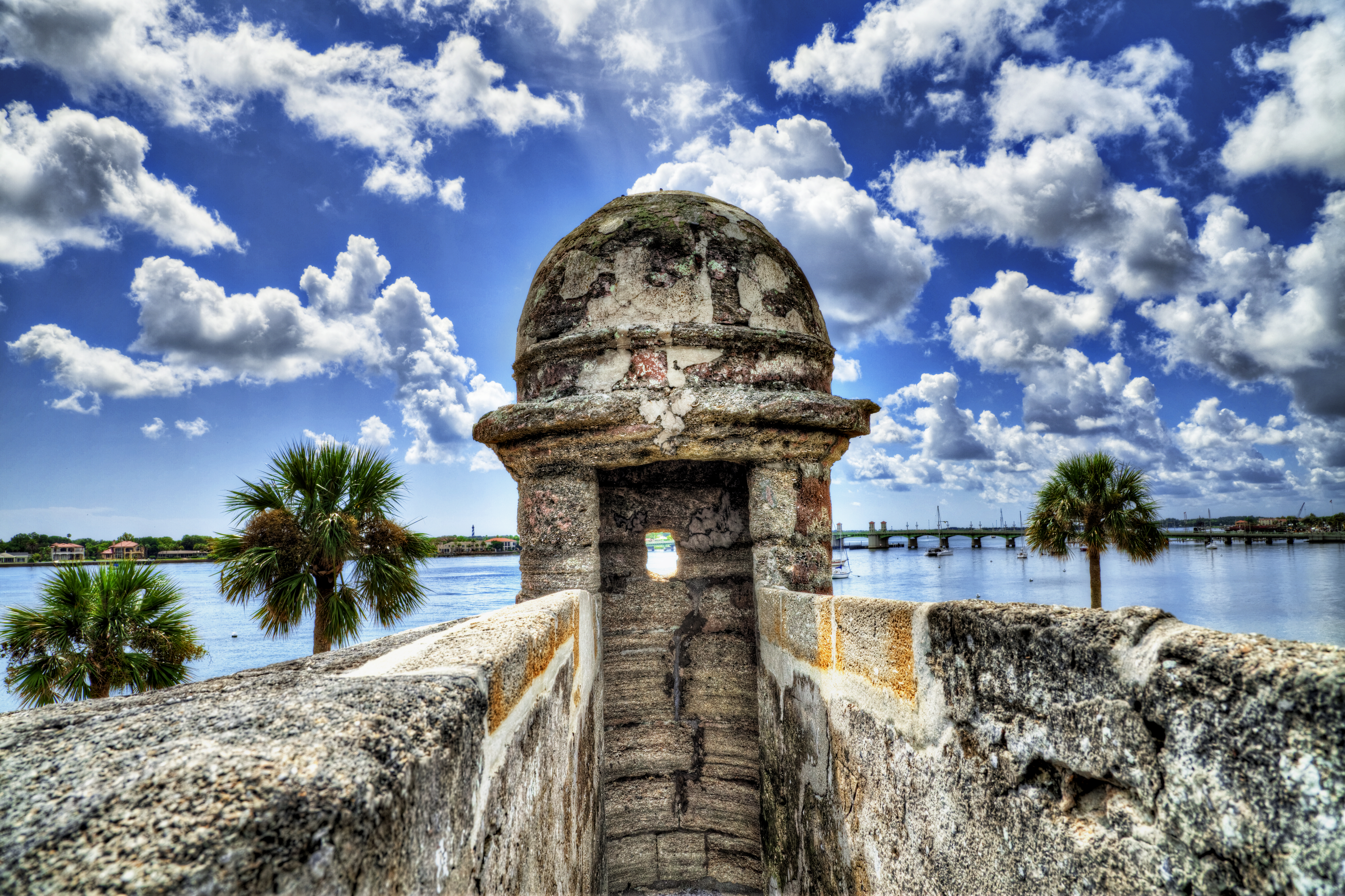
View from the castillo over the harbor area

Also on December 24, sails from a pair of ships were spotted approaching St. Augustine. English records do not indicate what these ships were; Spanish records show that they were English in origin, but probably not from Jamaica, since the nature of the siege did not change with their arrival. The expedition to Jamaica, having failed in its mission, returned directly to Charles Town.

Spanish messengers from Pensacola eventually reported St. Augustine's plight to Havana. Governor Pedro Nicolás Benítez held a war council on December 2, in which a relief expedition was organized. A detachment of over 200 infantry under the command of Captain López de Solloso was embarked on a small fleet headed by General Estevan de Berroa in the Black Eagle. Berroa's fleet arrived outside St. Augustine's harbor on December 28. Apparently believing the siege to already be over, Berroa did not land any troops. The next day, Governor Zúñiga sneaked some men out of the fort and made contact with the fleet. Berroa then landed Solloso and about 70 raw recruits on Anastasia Island, about 3 miles (4.8 km) below the fort. This action prompted Moore to lift the siege and prepare a retreat. Berroa also dispatched smaller ships to block the southern inlet to Matanzas Bay, trapping some of Moore's ships in the bay.

Moore ordered the remaining buildings in the town, including the church, put to the torch. Some of his men departed north via the mainland, while the rest crossed Matanzas Bay to their boats. Moore burned the eight ships trapped in the bay, and retreated to the north, eventually returning to Charles Town in disgrace. Zúñiga sent men out after the English departure; they were able to recover three of the English boats that failed to burn completely.

Casualty reports made by both sides varied; historian Charles Arnade notes that all of the numbers reported are probably unreliable. Moore's report listed only two men killed, while Zúñiga in his report claimed that more than 60 of the English force were killed. Zúñiga claimed only three or four killed and 20 wounded for the Spanish contingent, none of which were caused by English cannon fire.

== Aftermath ==
Moore was forced to resign his post as governor because of the failed raid, and its cost to the province (which included compensating owners for the loss of their ships) caused riots in Charles Town. Some of Moore's contemporary critics accused him of executing the raid for the purpose of seizing slaves or booty; the Spanish characterized it in religious terms, citing the "English provincial hatred against the Church of God." Moore continued to be active in the war, leading a small number of Carolinians and a large band of Indians on the destruction of Spanish missions in Florida in 1704. By August 1706, "the Carolinians had destroyed everything in Spanish Florida from the Apalachicola to the St. Johns River", with St. Augustine becoming the only colonial settlement in Florida still under Spanish control.

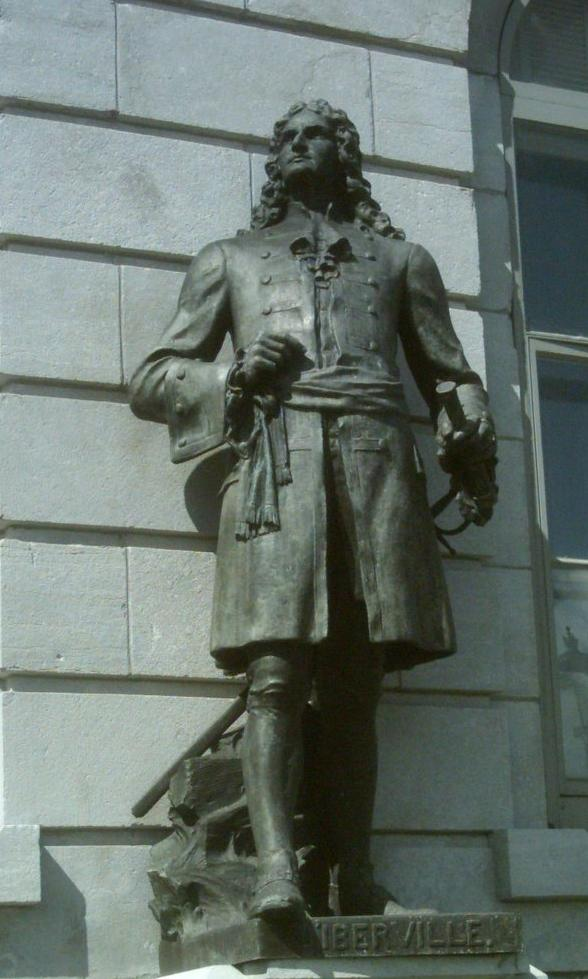
Pierre LeMoyne d'Iberville planned a 1706 expedition against Carolina

Governor Zúñiga was rewarded for his successful defense with a special commendation from the king and promotion to the more prestigious and desirable governorship of Cartagena. He made a series of highly critical complaints of General Berroa: the general failed to destroy the English fleet; he failed to share the plunder taken from the ships burned by the English; he refused to leave any of his fleet to assist in protection of the town; and he landed only the weakest and least effective troops in a bid to avoid combat. The general also sailed for Havana on January 8, barely one week after the siege was lifted.

In 1704 Governor Zúñiga convinced some Spanish privateers to raid the Carolina coast in revenge for Moore's activities. Spanish and French forces, motivated and organized by Pierre Le Moyne d'Iberville (who died shortly before its departure), attempted the capture of Charles Town in August 1706; their attempts to land forces were successfully repulsed.

The Castillo de San Marcos was not subjected to further attacks in the war. The expedition destroyed all but two communities in the provinces of Guale and Timucua; Spanish Florida never really recovered from the decimation of its population in the following years. St. Augustine was again unsuccessfully besieged in 1740 by forces from the Province of Georgia, and the castillo underwent numerous renovations and uses in the 18th and 19th centuries. It is now a National Monument managed by the National Park Service, and is listed on the National Register of Historic Places.

== See also ==
- Siege of St. Augustine (1740)
