= Apalachee massacre =

1704 engagement of Queen Anne's War

- Part of Queen Anne's War
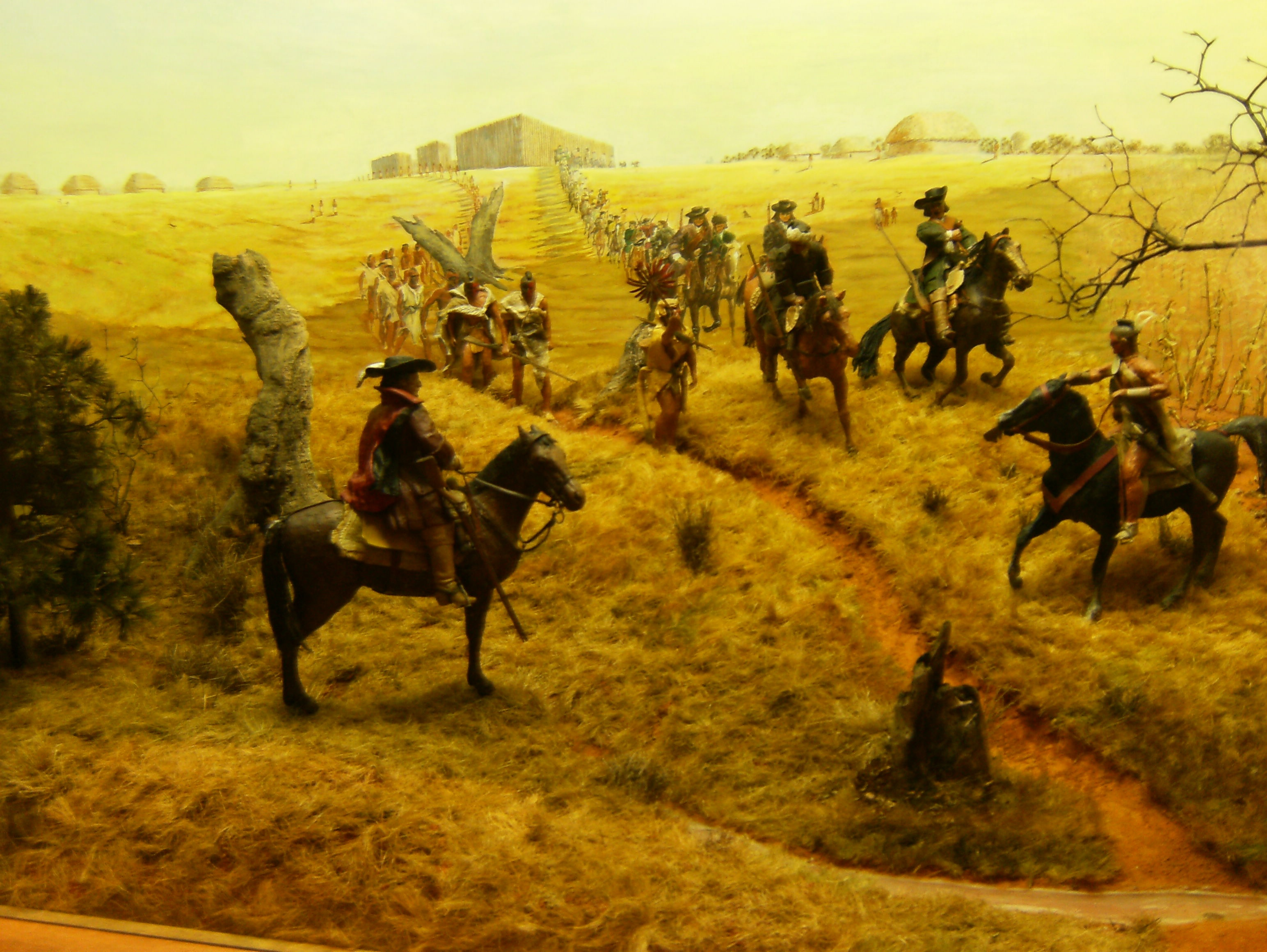
- A depiction of the raids at Ocmulgee Mounds National Historical Park
Date	January 1704
Location	Apalachee Province, Spanish Florida
Result	English-Muscogee victory

Belligerents
Carolina; Muscogee	Spain; Apalachee

Commanders and leaders
James Moore Sr.	(Spanish Empire) Angel de Miranda (Spanish Empire) Juan Ruíz de Mexía (POW)

Strength
50 English colonists 1,000 Indian warriors	30 Spanish cavalry 400 Indian warriors

Casualties and losses
18 killed, wounded or missing (English); 15 killed, wounded or missing (Muscogee)	4 killed 8 captured (Spanish); 200 killed or captured (Apalachee)

The Apalachee massacre was a series of raids by English colonists from the Province of Carolina and their Muscogee allies against a largely peaceful Apalachee population in northern Spanish Florida which took place in January 1704 during Queen Anne's War. Against limited Spanish and Apalachee resistance, a network of Catholic missions was destroyed by the raiders; most of their population were either killed, captured, fled to larger Spanish and French outposts, or voluntarily joined the English.

The only major event of former governor of Carolina James Moore Sr.'s expedition was the Battle of Ayubale, which marked the only large-scale resistance to the raids by the Spanish and Apalachee. Significant numbers of the Apalachee, unhappy with the conditions they lived in under in the Spanish missions, simply abandoned their towns and joined Moore's expedition. They were resettled near the Savannah and Ocmulgee Rivers, where living conditions proved to be only slightly better.

Moore's expedition was preceded and followed by other raids targeting Spanish Florida which was principally conducted by English-allied Muscogee. The cumulative effect of these raids, conducted between 1702 and 1709, was the depopulation of Spanish Florida beyond the immediate confines of the colonial settlements of Saint Augustine and Pensacola and the rapid decline of the colony's Indian population.

== Background ==
English and Spanish colonization efforts in American Southeast began coming into conflict as early as the middle of the 17th century. The 1670 establishment of the settlement of Charles Town by the English in the recently established Province of Carolina heightened tensions with the Spanish in Florida. Merchants, raiders, and slavers from Carolina penetrated into Florida, leading to raids and punitive expeditions being carried out by both the English and Spanish. In 1700, the governor of Carolina, Joseph Blake, threatened the Spanish with assertions that English claims to the colonial settlement of Pensacola, established in 1698, would be enforced. Blake's death later that year interrupted these plans, and he was replaced in 1702 by James Moore Sr.

The Spanish population of Florida at the time was fairly small compared to that of the nearby English colonies. Since its founding in the 16th century, the Spanish had set up a network of missions whose primary purpose was to pacify the local Indian population and convert them to Catholicism. In the Apalachee Province (roughly present-day western Florida and southwestern Georgia) there were 14 mission communities with a total population in 1680 of approximately 8,000. Many, but not all, of these missions were populated by the Apalachee; others were inhabited by other tribes that had migrated southward to the area. By the early 18th century, the Apalachee Province had become a major source of food for the principal towns of St. Augustine and Pensacola, which were situated near lands not well suited for agriculture.

The Indian populations of Florida were not entirely happy with Spanish rule; there had been several uprisings against the Spanish in the 17th century. The Indians were often forced to do work for the Spanish military garrisons and plantation owners, including the labor of hauling goods to St. Augustine, about 100 miles (160 km) away. These policies, and mistreatment by overbearing Spanish masters, led some Apalachees to flee to the English in Carolina. Spanish policy also forbade Indians the possession of muskets, which made them dependent on the Spanish for protection against the English-armed Muscogee.

News that the War of the Spanish Succession (known in North America as Queen Anne's War) had widened to include England arrived in Carolina by September 1702, and Governor Moore convinced the provincial assembly in September 1702 to fund an expedition against St. Augustine. The expedition was a failure, and there was rioting in Charles Town over the expenses incurred. One significant accomplishment of the St. Augustine expedition was the destruction of coastal Spanish mission towns in Guale Province (present-day coastal Georgia). After the expedition, Florida Governor José de Zúñiga y la Cerda ordered the remaining Spanish missions in Apalachee and Timucua Province to be moved closer together for defensive purposes. Missions in Mocama Province were consolidated south of the St. Johns River, and those in Timucua were consolidated at San Francisco de Potano. In early 1703, the Muscogee attacked San Joseph de Ocuya and San Francisco de Potano, also raiding either Patali or Piritiba; it is possible that as many as 500 Indians were enslaved as a result of these raids.

== Raid ==
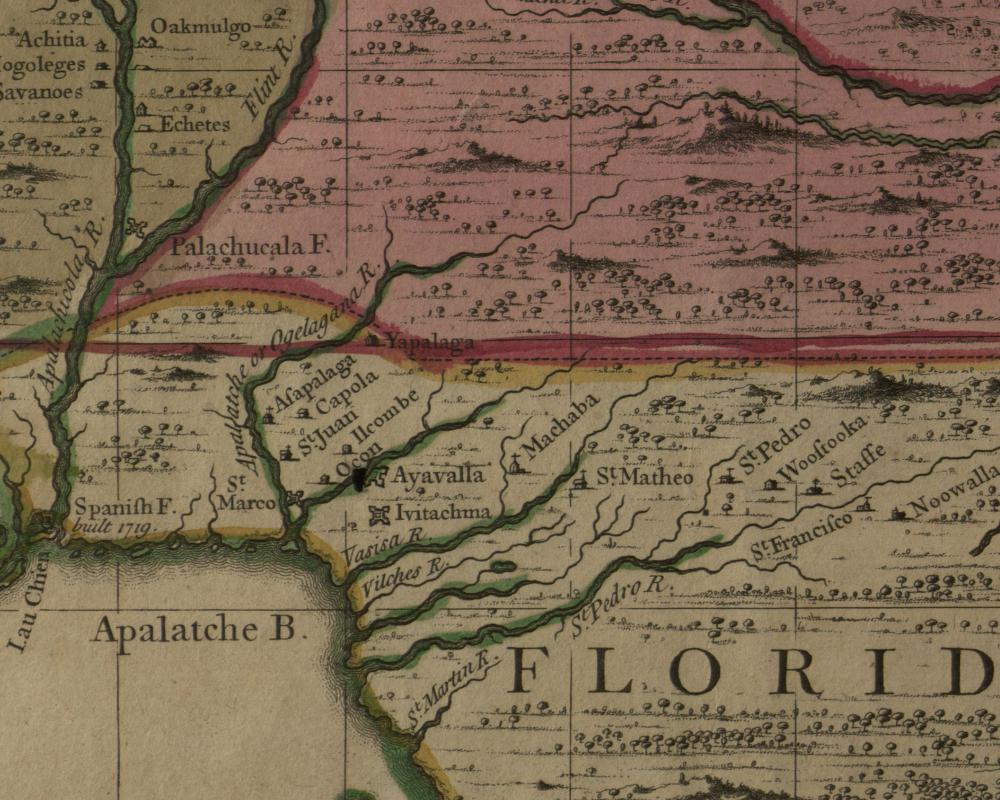
Detail from a 1733 map showing the Apalachee Province. Ayubale is marked "Ayavalla"; the locations of many mission villages are of uncertain accuracy.

In 1703, ex-Governor Moore presented to the Carolina assembly and his replacement, Nathaniel Johnson, a plan for an expedition against the Spanish towns in Apalachee Province. He promised that, unlike the St. Augustine expedition, the colony would not have to pay for anything; he expected its costs to be recovered by the taking of loot and slaves. On September 7, 1703, the Carolina assembly approved the plan, asking Moore to go "to the Assistance of the Cowetaws and other our friendly Indians, and to attacque the Appalaches." After recruiting 50 colonists, he traveled to the upper waters of the Ocmulgee River, where he recruited 1,000 Muscogee to join the expedition against their traditional enemies.

On January 25, 1704, Moore's force arrived at Ayubale, one of the larger mission towns in Apalachee. While most of the Muscogee raided the surrounding villages, Moore took most of the whites and 15 Muscogee into Ayubale itself around 7:00 am. The only resistance was organized by Father Angel Miranda, who retreated into the town's church compound, which was surrounded by a mud wall. With 26 men he successfully held the English at bay for nine hours, and only surrendered himself, his men, and 58 women and children after they ran out of arrows. According to one Spanish account, Miranda threw himself and his followers on Moore's mercy. He was, according to this account then summarily executed by English-allied Muscogee, and some of his followers were then tortured and killed.

Word of the attack reached San Luis de Apalachee, eight leagues (about 24 miles (39 km)) south of Ayubale, where Captain Juan Ruíz de Mexía raised a force of 400 Apalachee and 30 Spanish cavalrymen. This force engaged Moore's at Ayubale, and was decisively defeated. More than 200 Apalachees were killed or captured while three Spaniards were killed and eight were captured, with Mexía among the captured. There is evidence that as many as 50 Apalachee joined with the English against the Spanish-led forces in this encounter. Moore considered launching an attack on the fort at San Luis, but his force had suffered a significant number of wounds, so he opted instead for an attempt at extortion. Some of the Spanish prisoners managed to escape, so he released Miranda, Mexía and others to go to San Luis with the hope that the San Luis garrison commander would then pay a ransom for them. However, the garrison commander refused to pay.

== Aftermath ==
Following the battle at Ayubale, Moore continued his march through Apalachee. One village, San Lorenzo de Ivitachuco, survived when its leader surrendered his church's gold ornaments and a train of supplies. Moore moved slowly, since many of the Apalachee apparently wanted to leave with the English. According to his report, most of the population of seven villages joined his march voluntarily. In Moore's report of the expedition he claimed to have killed more than 1,100 men, women, and children. Moore also stated that he "removed into exile" 300 and "captured as slaves" more than 4,300 people, mostly women and children. The only major missions to survive in Apalachee were San Luis and San Lorenzo de Ivitachuco. The Spanish at first attempted to fortify these places, but they were eventually judged to be indefensible and abandoned. The survivors were consolidated at Abosaya, east of San Francisco de Potano.

Moore did not identify by name the places his force destroyed. Historian Mark Boyd has analyzed English and Spanish sources documenting the missions and the effects of Moore's raid. According to his analysis, the La Concepción de Ayubale, San Francisco de Oconi, San Antonio de Bacqua, San Martín de Tomole and Santa Cruz y San Pedro de Alcántara de Ychuntafun missions were the ones most likely to have been destroyed. Spanish authorities in St. Augustine and Pensacola mobilized their meager forces, but did not return to Ayubale until after Moore's force had clearly left the area. They buried the Christian dead, many of whom they reported as exhibiting evidence of torture. Despite the losses, they did not immediately abandon or consolidate the missions until further raiding took place, after which the demoralized surviving Apalachee insisted they would either retreat to Pensacola or go over to the English.

In the wake of Moore's raids, further raids were made into northern Florida, principally executed by the Muscogee. In August 1704, Muscogee raiders destroyed the Yustagan missions of San Pedro and San Mateo; a year later they attacked the Apalachee at Abosaya. Further attacks against Abosaya the next month prompted the survivors to flee to St. Augustine. In the spring of 1706, the Muscogee besieged San Francisco de Potano and attacked the La Chua ranch near Abosaya; both of these were abandoned, and Timucua was virtually depopulated by May 1706. According to Apalachee scholar John Hann, between Moore's raids and these later ones, 2,000 Indians went into exile, and an unknown number were enslaved. The French governor of Mobile, Jean-Baptiste Le Moyne de Bienville, wrote that raiding the Florida area resulted in the killing of 2,000 Apalachees and the capture of 32 Spaniards, 17 of whom were burned alive. By the end of 1706 the Spanish presence in Florida had been reduced to St. Augustine and Pensacola.

== Legacy ==
All of [this] I have done with the loss of 4 whites and 15 Indians, and without one Penny charge to the Publick. Before this Expedition, we were more afraid of the Spaniards of Apalatchee and their Indians in Conjunction with the French of Mississippi, and their Indians, doing us Harm by Land, than of any Forces of the Enemy by Sea. This has wholly disabled them from attempting anything against Us by Land.

— James Moore's report

Many survivors fled westward and settled near the French colonial outpost of Mobile, while others ended up near either St. Augustine or Pensacola; Bienville reported that about 600 refugees were settled near Mobile. The Apalachees taken by Moore were resettled either along the Savannah River, or among the Muscogee living near the Ocmulgee River. The free Apalachee refugees that settled these areas were frequently harassed by slavers; in some cases Indians taken as slaves were freed after protests were made to Carolina authorities.

The Spanish responded to the raids by encouraging privateering raids against Carolina coastal plantations. In the following years, the English colonists continued to make inroads against Spanish and French interests in Florida and on the Gulf Coast, but they were never able to capture St. Augustine, Pensacola, or Mobile, the main Spanish and French settlements. Pensacola was twice besieged by the Muscogee in 1707, apparently with English colonial support. English-allied Indians also made incursions into French-dominated territories to the west, but English intentions to assault Mobile never got beyond the planning stages; there was a raid on an Indian village near Mobile in 1709.

Due in part to the somewhat fragmentary, unclear, and contradictory primary materials about these raids, historians have at times written widely varying accounts of the number of Indians that were enslaved. Although Moore claimed in his report that a large number of Apalachee were enslaved, modern historians believe that a significant number of those resettled by Moore went voluntarily, and were not actually slaves. Vernon Crane, in The Southern Frontier, 1670–1732 (originally published in 1929), uncritically accepts Moore's numbers, and 19th century South Carolina historian Edward McCrady only mentions 1,400 Apalachees being taken, of whom only 100 were slaves. Historian Allan Gallay, in a modern analysis, opines that the raids in 1704 alone resulted in the enslavement of between 2,000 and 4,000 Indians.

Opinions also differ as to the long-term fate of the Indians that voluntarily went with Moore. Since a 1715 census of the Savannah River settlements counted fewer than 650 Apalachees, Allan Gallay believes that the balance were probably sold into slavery. James Covington believes that a combination of factors was to blame: in addition to active slaving against those settlements, disease, starvation, intermarriage with other tribes, and migration to other communities account for the difference.
