= John Archdale =

British colonial governor

12th Governor of South Carolina
- In office August 1695 – 29 October 1696
- Monarch: William III
- Preceded by: Joseph Blake
- Succeeded by: Joseph Blake

Personal details
- Born: 1642 England
- Died: 1717 (aged 74–75) England
- Resting place: All Saints Parish Church, High Wycombe, England
- Spouse: Ann Dobson
- Occupation: Colonial administrator
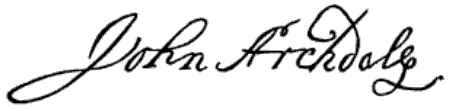
- Signature

John Archdale (5 March 1642 – 4 July 1717) served as English colonial Governor of North Carolina and Governor of South Carolina in 1695 and 1696. He may have also been appointed to serve circa 1683–1686. Archdale was appointed to the position by the Lords Proprietors of Carolina.

== Biography ==
He first travelled from England to North America in 1664 as an agent of his brother-in-law, Sir Ferdinando Gorges. In 1683 John Archdale went to North Carolina as collector of quitrents. After the Lords Proprietors commissioned him governor of Carolina in August 1694, Archdale appointed Thomas Harvey to act as deputy governor for North Carolina, and set out for Charles Towne. John Archdale replaced Joseph Blake as governor in August 1695; when he sailed for England in October 1696, he named Blake his deputy governor. Governor Archdale never returned to Carolina. He died in England 1717.

According to Appleton's Cyclopedia, Governor Archdale "was sagacious, prudent, and moderate, and under his administration the province made great progress in internal improvements. He introduced rice culture into Carolina by distributing among some friends a bag of seed rice brought by the captain of a vessel from Madagascar."

The city of Archdale, North Carolina, which began as a Quaker settlement, was named for him because Archdale was himself a Quaker. There was also an Archdale Precinct in colonial Bath County, North Carolina, from 1705 until 1712.

Archdale was elected to Parliament from the constituency of Wycombe in 1698, but he would not take his seat due to his refusal to take the required oath.

Archdale published A New Description of the Fertile and Pleasant Province of Carolina, with a Brief Account of its Discovery, Settling, and Government, up to this Time, with several Remarkable Passages during My Time (London, 1707). See Hewatt's Historical Account of the Rise and Progress of the Colonies of South Carolina and Georgia (London, 1779); Holmes's Annals of America (Cambridge, 1829); and Bancroft's History of the United States (New York, 1884).

Parliament of England
Preceded by Fleetwood Dormer; Charles Godfrey	Member of Parliament for Wycombe; 1698–1699; With: Charles Godfrey	Succeeded by Charles Godfrey; Thomas Archdale
