= James Moore Sr. =

Governor of Carolina from 1700 to 1703

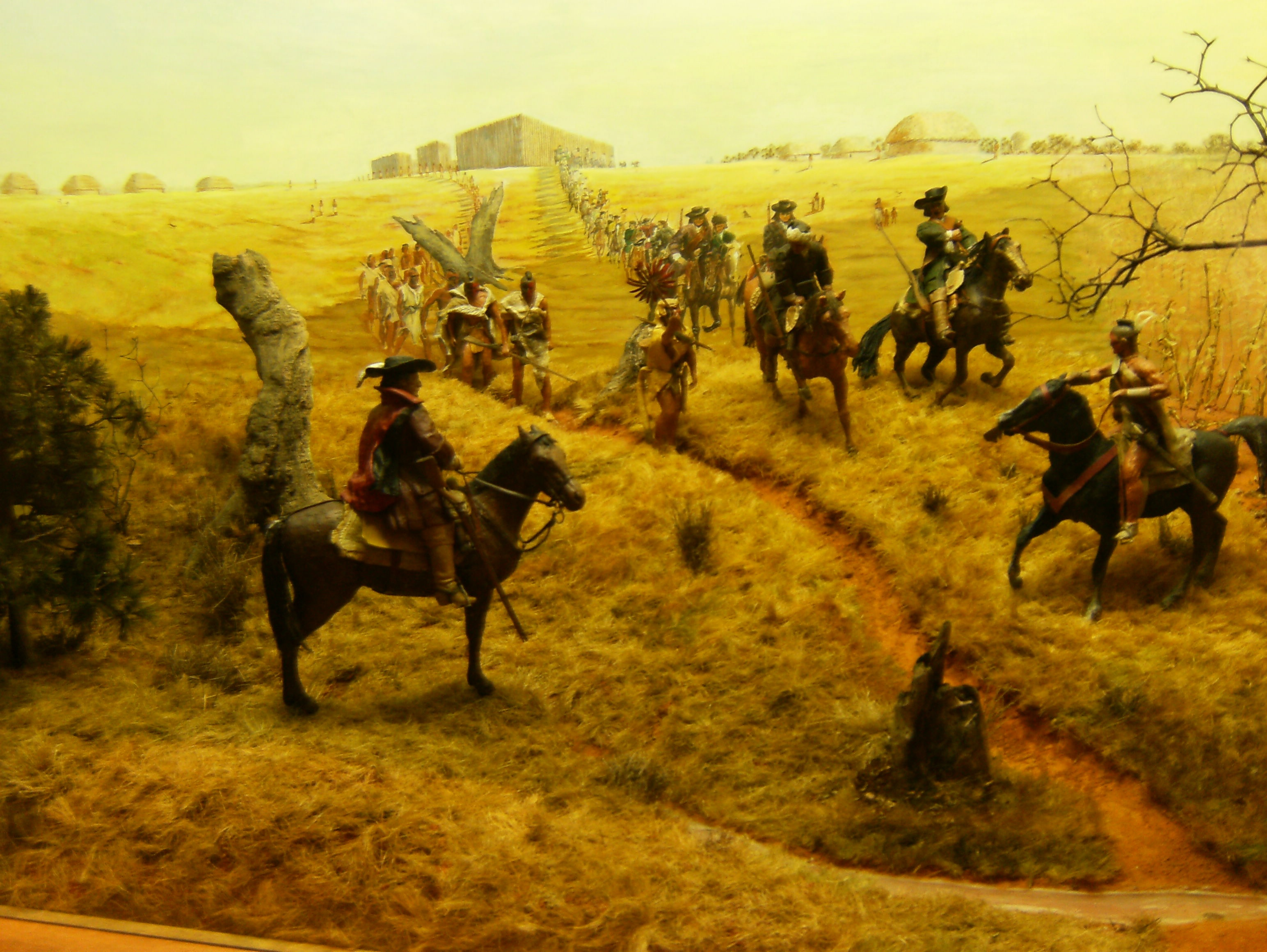
- A depiction of Moore during the Apalachee massacre in the Ocmulgee Mounds Park

Governor of Carolina
- In office 11 September 1700 – March 1703
- Monarchs: William III; Anne
- Preceded by: Joseph Blake
- Succeeded by: Nathaniel Johnson

Personal details
- Born: c. 1640
- Died: c. 1706 (aged c. 66) Charleston, South Carolina
- Children: James and Mary

Military service
- Allegiance: England
- Battles/wars: War of the Spanish Succession Siege of St. Augustine

James Moore Sr. (c. 1640 – c. 1706) was a military officer and colonial administrator who served as the governor of Carolina from 1700 to 1703. He is best known for leading several invasions of Spanish Florida during Queen Anne's War, including attacks in 1704 and 1706 which wiped out most of the Spanish missions in Florida. He captured and brought back to Carolina as slaves thousands of Apalachee.

== Early life ==
James Moore was born c. 1640. It has been claimed that Moore was a son of Irish military officer Rory O'Moore, a leader of the Irish Rebellion of 1641, and that he had inherited his father's rebellious nature. However, Moore's official seal bore the swan and arms of the Moore family of Devonshire, suggesting his origins were English.

It appears Moore emigrated from England to Barbados, then eventually to mainland North America. He first appears in provincial records in 1675 representing Margaret Berringer Yeamans, widow of Sir John Yeamans, before the provincial council. At about the same time he married her daughter by her first husband, also named Margaret.

== Career ==
In 1677, 1682, and 1683, Moore served on the provincial council. He played a leading role in a 1690 expedition into the Carolina back country, crossing the Appalachians to investigate possibilities of trade with the local Indian population. In 1698 he was elected to the provincial assembly, and was described as the right-hand-man of proprietor Sir John Colleton. The next year he was named chief justice of the province, a post he held until he was named governor in 1700, replacing the deceased Joseph Blake.

Moore was a leader of one of Carolina's political factions, called the "Goose Creek Men", after Goose Creek, an outlying area of Charleston.

In 1683, Moore was granted 2,400 acres (970 ha) by the lords proprietor. He called his estate "Boochowee". Part of this land is known today as Liberty Hall Plantation.

From 1691, Moore was the acknowledged leader of the Goose Creek Men, the main political opposition to the ruling "Dissenter" faction. Moore's rise to governorship in 1700 signalled a major shift in the politics of the province. The Dissenters contested Moore's "unjust election". But the lords proprietor saw to it that Moore remained governor, and they made it clear that the Dissenters were no longer in favor.

Between 1700 and 1703, Moore was the governor of Carolina, which was then in the process of dividing into the provinces of North and South Carolina. During this period, he led a number of attacks from the Carolinas into Spanish Florida. He relied on allied Indian tribes, especially the Yamasee for most of his military force. On news of the outbreak of Queen Anne's War in 1702, he led 500 colonists, 300 native allies, and 14 small ships on an invasion of Spanish Florida along the coast, destroying the remaining Spanish missionary Indians of Guale and Mocama, and devastating the lands around St. Augustine. While the town of St. Augustine was razed, its central fortress, Castillo de San Marcos, where the Spanish and numerous allied Indians had taken refuge, resisted Moore's siege. The 1702 campaign was viewed as a disaster due to the failure to take the fortress and the expenses incurred, and Moore resigned his post.

In 1704, Moore led an expedition of 50 colonists and 1,000 Muscogee, Yamasee, and other allied Indians, into western Florida, leading to the Apalachee massacre. The Apalachee were the last powerful Spanish-allied Indian nation in the region. Their defeat in 1704 resulted in many Apalachee being enslaved and taken from Charleston to the West Indies. Other Apalachee were relocated (some voluntarily, others not) to the Savannah River to live in semi-serfdom. Another result of the defeat of the Apalachee was the collapse of the final defence of the Indians of Florida. In the following years, Carolinian and Indian slave raiders virtually wiped out the Indian population of Florida all the way to the Florida Keys.

Moore's defeat of the Apalachee in Spanish Florida was hailed as a major victory for Carolina, which had been fighting with the Spanish for control of the region for decades. It also served to strengthen ties between various southeastern Indians and Carolina. The Creek people and the Cherokees became much more closely allied with Carolina. With these two Indian nations as strong allies, the English rose to a position of dominance over the French and Spanish in the American southeast.

Moore died in 1706 in Charleston of a tropical disease, possibly yellow fever. He was significantly in debt. His son by the same name was elected to the same office in 1719 following the overthrow of the proprietary governor.

== Personal life ==
Coat of Arms of James Moore Sr.

Moore married Margaret Berringer, daughter of Lady Margaret Yeamans (by a previous marriage). Their daughter, Mary Moore, married Job Howe, another of the "Goose Creek Men". Altogether James and Margaret had ten children, many of whom moved to the Lower Cape Fear region, where they and their descendants became known as "The Family", the most powerful family in the region. Moore was the grandfather of Continental Army Brigadier General James Moore, and great-grandfather of Continental Army Major General Robert Howe.

The Moore family imported over 4,000 slaves into the Carolinas, mostly for its own extensive plantations and farms in and around the Cape Fear area of what later became North Carolina. James Moore also had a house in Charleston and another in the Goose Creek area near Charleston.

Another Moore family descendant, Alfred Moore, became a Justice of the U.S. Supreme Court.

=== Family tree ===
Margaret Berringer	James Moore
Maurice Moore	Mary Porter	James Moore Jr.
James	John Ashe	Rebecca	Maurice	James Moore
