= Mission San Luis de Apalache =

- San Luis De Talimali (formerly San Luis de Apalache)
- U.S. National Register of Historic Places
- U.S. National Historic Landmark
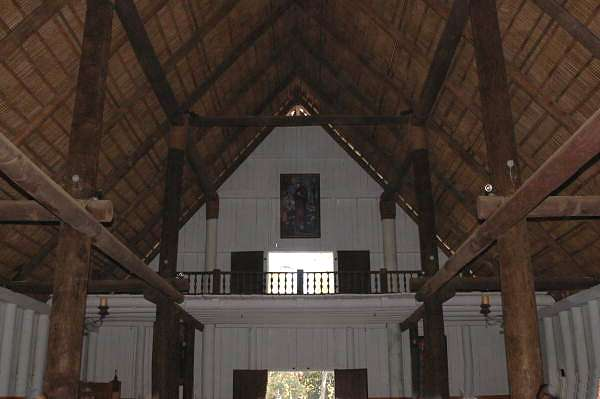

- Location within Florida Location within the United States
- Location: Leon County, Florida, USA
- Nearest city: Tallahassee, Florida
- Coordinates: 30°26′56.72″N 84°19′11.66″W
- NRHP reference No.: 66000266

Significant dates
- Added to NRHP: October 15, 1966
- Designated NHL: October 15, 1966

Mission San Luis de Apalachee (also known as San Luis de Talimali) was a Spanish Franciscan mission built in 1656 in the Florida Panhandle, two miles west of the present-day Florida Capitol Building in Tallahassee, Florida. It was located in the descendent settlement of Anhaica (also as Anhayca Apalache or Inihayca) capital of Apalachee Province. The mission was part of Spain's effort to colonize the Florida Peninsula and to convert the Timucuan and Apalachee Indians to Christianity. The mission lasted until 1704 when it was evacuated and destroyed to prevent its use by an approaching militia of Creek Indians and South Carolinians.

The site where the mission stood was designated a U.S. National Historic Landmark on October 15, 1966. The State of Florida purchased the area in 1983. Archaeological and historical research continued for the next 15 years.

In 1998, a project began to reconstruct some of the mission buildings on the site, based on archeological and historical evidence. Today, Mission San Luis operates as a living-history museum with reconstructed Apalachee and Spanish buildings.

== History ==
Apalachee Province was one of the most powerful and wealthy chiefdoms or provinces in Florida and the Apalachee were the most stratified and populous native peoples in Florida, surpassing the Timucua, Potano, Tocobaga, and Calusa. The Apalachee were part of the Mississippian culture of mound builders and had well-established administrative and religious systems.

== First contact ==
In 1528, Pánfilo de Narváez is the first recorded European presence in Apalachee setting up camp south of Anhaica near present-day St. Marks. In 1539, Hernando de Soto wintered at Anhaica (in present-day Tallahassee) celebrating the first Christmas in the North America. In 1607, some Apalachee Indians requested friars and the first ones visited in 1608. In 1612 the Apalachees made a formal request for a mission but the Spanish did not oblige. In 1625 Apalachees began to send food supplies overland to St. Augustine, the major point of Spanish control over shipping and defense of La Florida. The Spanish, however, needed the densely populated and extremely fertile Apalachee Province to provide labor and provisions for St. Augustine.

In 1633, Pedro Muñoz and Francisco Martínez launched a formal mission effort in Apalachee Province at the request of Apalachee Chiefs'. In 1638 the first of 3 or 4 soldiers came to Apalachee Province to explore for ports and purchase foodstuffs for the governor. No evidence has been discovered indicating a fort or garrison was built then.

== Spanish rule ==
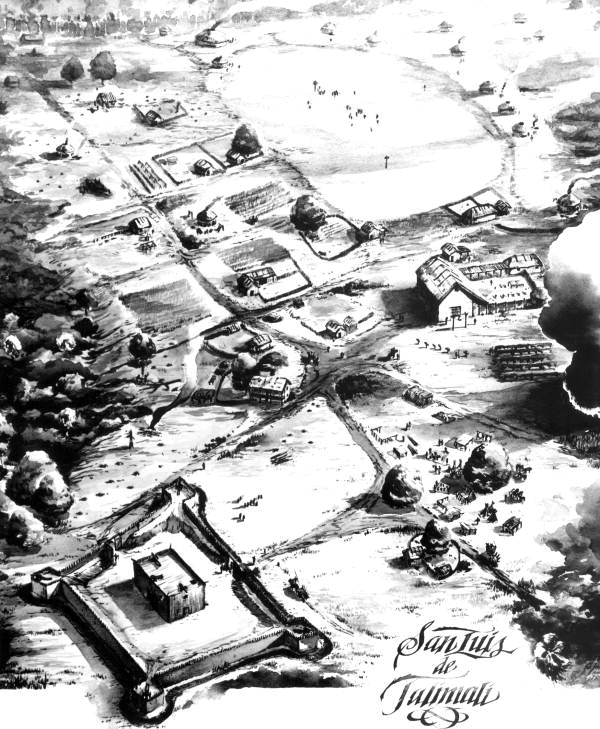
The Mission San Luis de Apalachee as it may have appeared in the 17th century.

From 1645 to 1651 soldiers lived at Asile Hacienda on Apalachee Province's eastern border. The soldiers and deputy governor were both removed late in 1651 and did not return until mid-1654 under a new governor.

In 1656, Spanish authorities decided to establish their western capital on one of the region's highest hilltops for strategic purposes. The original 1633 San Luis was described by Spanish military authorities as extending for miles and being completely indefensible. The inhabitants of San Luis moved to the present site at the request of the Spaniards in 1656. The garrison was expanded to 12 and San Luis's chief promised to build a substantial blockhouse for them. Under pressure from other Apalachee, San Luis's chief said that 6 soldiers would suffice. Although the governor planned for further expansion of the garrison and building a regular fort, Apalachee opposition to the project stalled it for well over a generation. The blockhouse at San Luis was described in 1675 as a "fortified country house." From 1656 to 1680 the size of the garrison varied between 12, 19, and 25 men.

The Apalachee men and women were excellent agriculturists and provided much of the food for San Luis as well as for export to such places as St. Augustine and Havana. The majority of any construction needs were also completed by the Apalachee, including assisting with the construction of the Castillo de San Marcos. This was part of the repartimento, a colonial labor system imposed upon indigenous groups within territory claimed by the Spanish. These tasks pulled the Apalachee away from their own farms and homes, sometimes for months at a time.

The first deputy governor, Claudio Luis de Florencia, arrived in 1645. Luis de Florencia lived with his extended family at old San Luis. Nothing is known about the nature of his residence. By 1675 more than 1,400 Apalachee and several hundred Spanish lived under the jurisdiction of San Luis. There were very few Spanish women creating a situation where the Spanish soldiers frequently married Indian women as a means to Christianize the native population and make them more "civilized." While the size of most other Apalachee missions declined sharply over the years, the population of San Luis increased.

== Buildings ==
The buildings at San Luis included Spanish and Apalachee residential areas, the Franciscan Church and Spanish fort, as well as the native Council House, which is the largest known historic Indian structure in the southeastern United States at the time holding 2,000–3,000 people.

In the early 1680s, the blockhouse was pulled down and replaced with a temporary makeshift barracks. The garrison was then expanded to 40 men, and sometimes even more for special expeditions.

In 1688, San Marcos de Apalache at St. Marks was also built from lumber cut at San Luis, but it was left to rot when the skilled laborers were diverted to construct a fort in Apalachicola Province in 1689. This fort was staffed by 20 soldiers and 20 Apalachee warriors.

From 1695 to 1697 San Luis's new blockhouse was built. In mid-April 1696, the governor reported that it was completed except for one-third of the roof. Work was then suspended because of the spring planting.

In 1698, San Luis Apalachees were seriously alienated when Spaniards commandeered some of their houses and land; Spaniards also took lumber intended for church repairs and forced Indians to build houses for them.

In October 1702, an attempt to turn the blockhouse into a proper fort began after the defeat of a Spanish-Apalachee force on the Flint River. The fort would have a palisade and parapets, as well as a dry moat. It was apparently completed in 1703 despite the impact of a severe epidemic. At the end of July 1704, following a series of raids by English colonists from the Province of Carolina and their Creek allies throughout the Apalachee Territory, the Apalachee washed their hands of the Spanish. Unwilling to fight with the Spanish any longer, the Apalachee dispersed to the west, east, and north; some willingly, while many others were enslaved by the English. When San Luis was abandoned the Apalachee and Spanish together burned the fort and the entire village to the ground.

Beginning in 1996, Renker Eich Parks Architects, of St. Petersburg, Florida, with Herchel Sheperd, FAIA, undertook designing the reconstruction of many of the buildings in the mission using archeological and historical evidence to conjecture the architecture of the buildings to how they would originally have been built. The buildings that have since been reconstructed include the Church, the Convento, the Council House, the Chief's House, the Fort and Blockhouse, and a typical Spanish House as well as many minor features around the site. Many of these buildings were built directly atop their historical location.

== Today ==
Mission San Luis is a living history museum that features an artifact gallery of items recovered from the site, many reconstructed buildings, and third-person interpreters dressed in historical wardrobe. The site covers 64-acres and includes the history of the Mission and subsequent land holders.

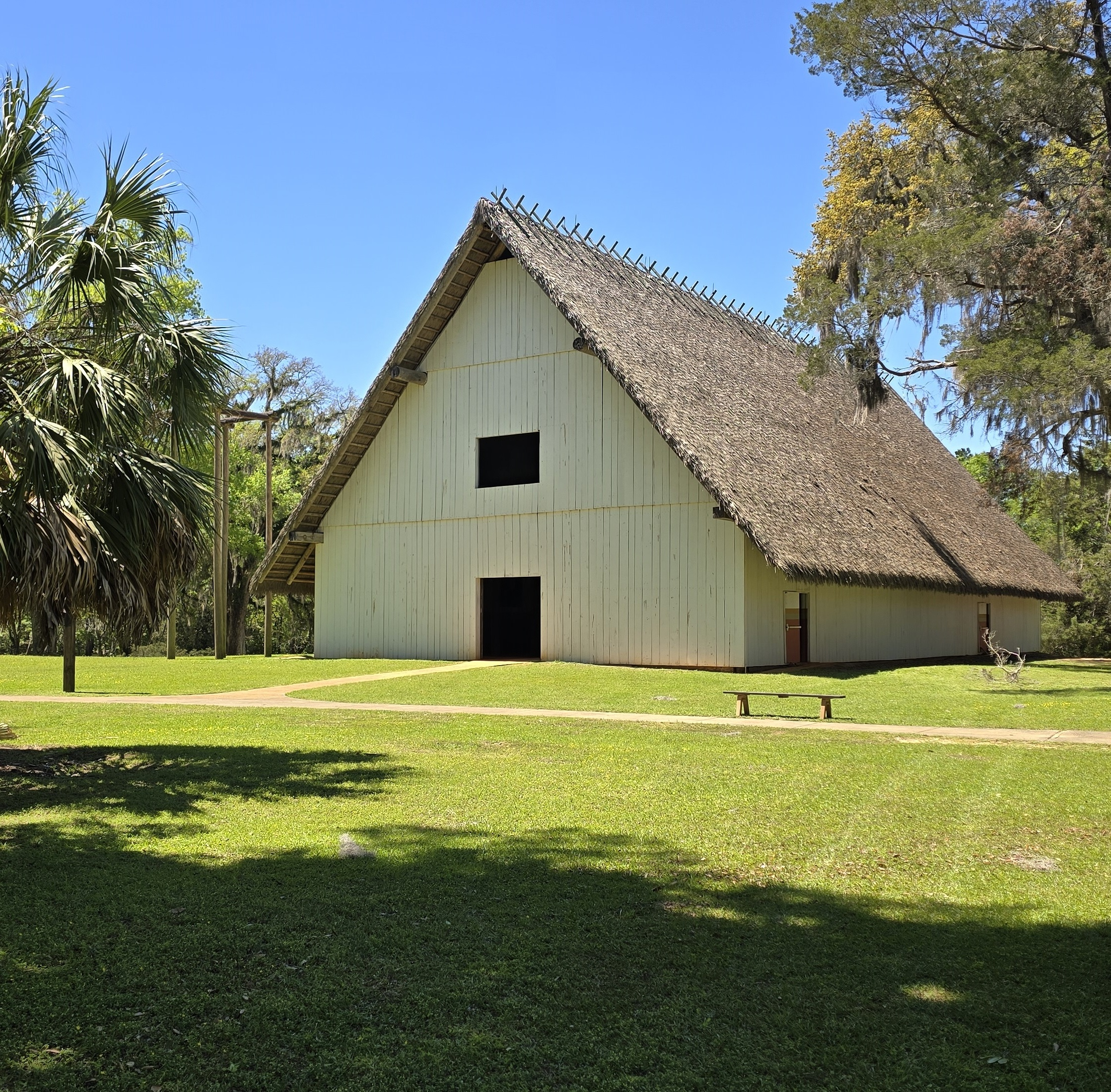
Reconstructed Franciscan Church

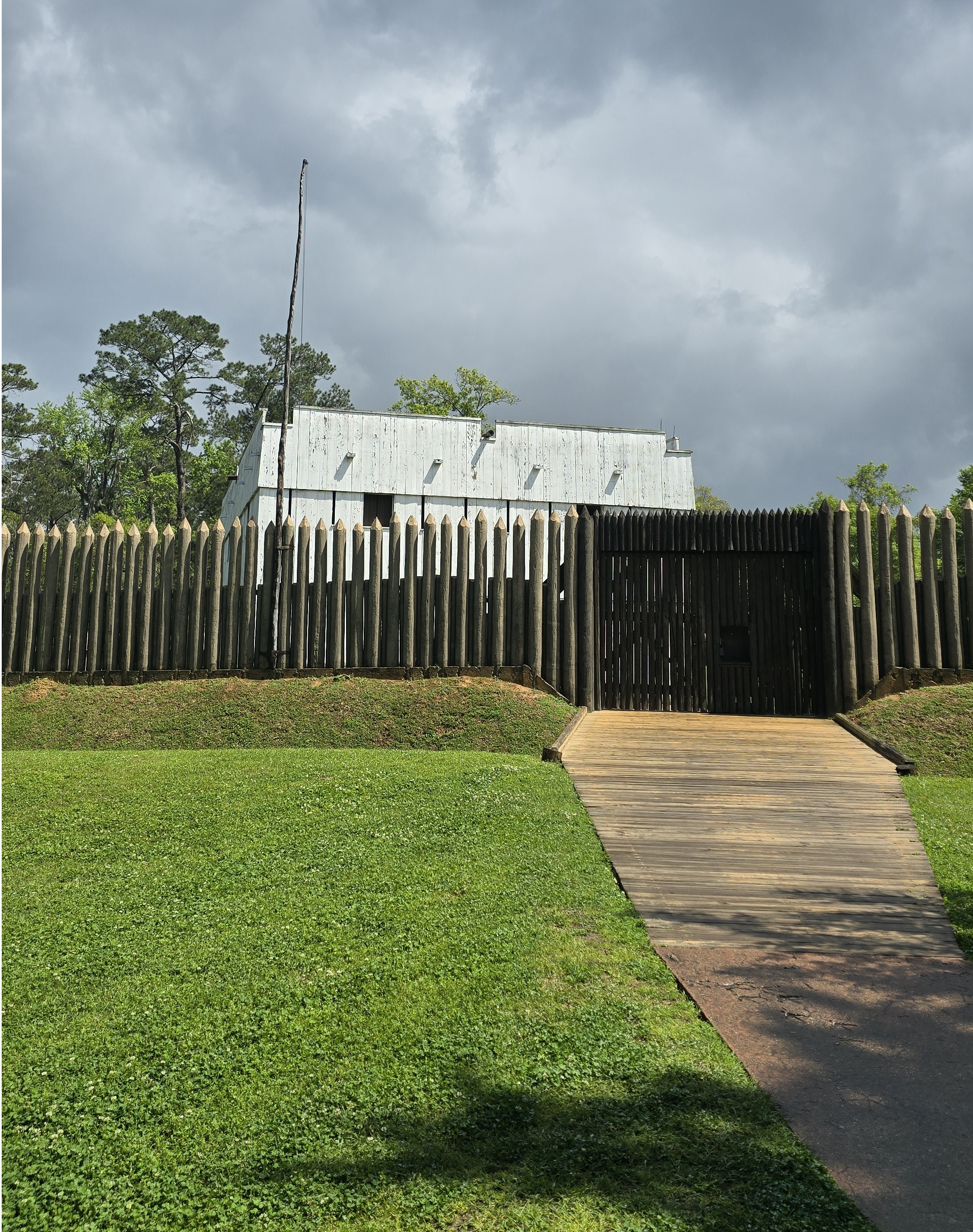
Reconstructed Spanish Fort
