= Capture of Pensacola (1719) =

1719 battle

Coordinates: 30°20′52″N 87°17′50″W

- Part of War of the Quadruple Alliance
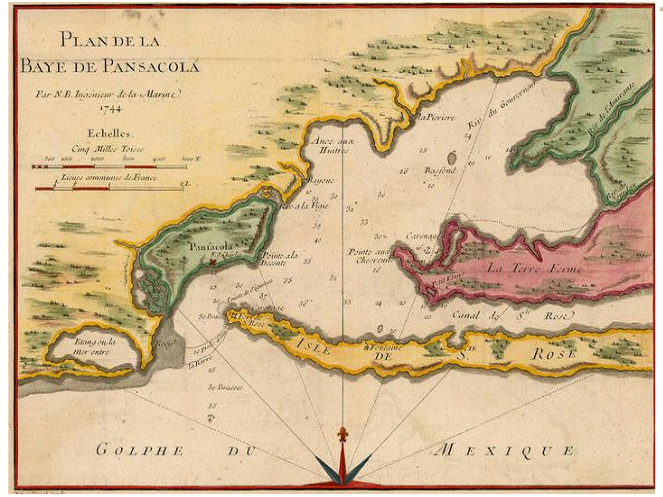
- Bay of Pensacola
Date	May 1719
Location	Pensacola
Result	French victory

Belligerents
France	Spain

Commanders and leaders
Jean-Baptiste Le Moyne de Bienville	

Strength
Unknown	Unknown

The Capture of Pensacola took place in May 1719 during the War of the Quadruple Alliance when a French force led by Jean-Baptiste Le Moyne de Bienville took and occupied the settlement of Pensacola in the Spanish colony of Florida. The French occupied Pensacola until August 1719, when a large Spanish force arrived and compelled the small French garrison to surrender. This Spanish occupation only lasted until September 1, when a French fleet arrived to reassert French control.

The war ended with the Treaty of the Hague and Pensacola was officially returned to Spanish control in exchange for French commercial benefits, though the French garrison did not withdraw until 1726.

== Bibliography ==
- Bense, Judith A. Archaeology of colonial Pensacola. University Press of Florida, 1999.
- Claiborne, John. 1880 Mississippi, as a province, territory, and state. Contains a somewhat detailed account of the affair, page 36.
- Marley, David. Wars of the Americas: a chronology of armed conflict in the New World, 1492 to the Present. ABC-Clio, 1998.
