= Thomas Nairne =

American colonialist

Thomas Nairne (died c. 17 April 1715) was a Scots trader and the first Indian agent of the Province of Carolina. He is best known for recording Native American customs and practices in the 1690s and 1700s and for articulating policies that guided colonial policy. A settler in the failed Scottish colony of Stuarts Town (near present-day Port Royal, South Carolina), he traveled throughout the southeast, ranging as far as the Mississippi River, and served in the Carolina provincial assembly. He was tortured to death by Yamasee in April 1715 during the Yamasee War.

== Early life ==
He arrived in South Carolina from Scotland in 1695. In that same year, he married his wife Elizabeth Quintyne, a widow and mother of four children. In 1698, they had a son together named Thomas.

After arriving in South Carolina, Nairne became a representative of the House of Commons Assembly for Colleton County in 1707. He opposed Governor Nathaniel Johnson. In the early 1700s, the House of Commons created the office of Indian agents through the Board of Indian Commissioners Act.

== Indian agent ==
Thomas Nairne was the first Indian agent for South Carolina. During this period, Thomas Nairne arrested Governor Nathaniel Johnson's son on charges of enslaving friendly Indians and illegally stealing deerskins. Governor Johnson charged Nairne with treason, and he was forced to return to England to defend his actions.

Nairne devised a plan to pressure the Indians who had allied with the French and use the Creek Indians to come down upon the French from the Tallapoosa River with a fleet of 80 canoes with 500 Indians coming by canoe and another 1,000 coming by land. In Nairne's memorial, he claimed that he "ventured my life and made peace with the Choctas". The French counteracted back. Neither the French nor the English amassed an Indian army, and they continued to maintain their respective allies through the end of Queen Anne's War.

== Death ==
During his second tenure as an Indian agent, Thomas Nairne and another fellow Indian agent, John Wright, were dispatched to placate issues with the Yamasee. On April 14, they had a feast with the Yamasee. After the feast, the agents went to bed. On April 15, at dawn, the Indians were killing any Europeans. Nairne was tortured for three days by the Yamasee before ultimately dying on 17 April 1715.
