= Tallapoosa people =

Muscogee Creek Native Americans

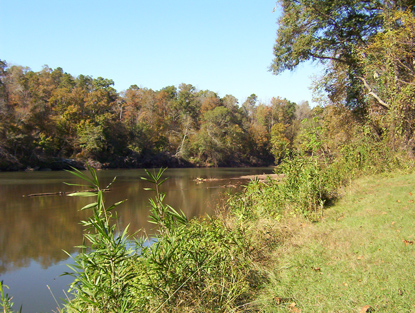
Tallapoosa River, near Horseshoe Bend, Alabama

The Tallapoosas were a division of the Upper Creeks in the Muscogee Confederacy. Prior to Removal to Indian Territory, Tallapoosa lived along the Tallapoosa River in Alabama.

They are also called the Cadapouches or Canapouches, which was mistakenly considered a synonym for the Catawba of the Carolina.

== 16th century ==
Spanish explorers described towns along the Tallapoosa as being surrounded by protective wooden palisades. In later years, the palisades were no longer built. They made ceramics using grit as a temper.

== 17th century ==
Over 30 towns along the Tallapoosa, Coosa, and Chattahoochee Rivers allied to form the Muscogee Confederacy. The Tallapoosa were among these Upper Creeks, who were more culturally and politically conservative than the Lower Creek towns.

== 18th century ==
The Tallapoosas fought in the siege of Pensacola. Although these warriors proved their effectiveness in combining native tactics and European arms, the English failed to compensate them adequately and seriously underestimated their importance as the key to the balance of power in the southeastern interior. Consequently, by 1716 the Tallapoosas and other tribes had shifted allegiance to the other side and prepared to use what they had learned against South Carolina settlements.

== 19th century ==
The Tallapoosas were a part of a "Creek traditionalist faction," the Red Sticks, that fought in the Battle of Holy Ground. In the summer of 1813, the Red Sticks built new settlements for "each component of the Upper Creek Nation (Alabamas, Tallapoosas, Abeikas). The Tallapoosas built a new settlement near the town of Autossee, and the Abeikas erected Tohopeka, a fortified encampment at the Horseshoe Bend of the Tallapoosa River. The Alabamas built Holy Ground, or Econochaca ... on the bluffs above the Alabama River, approximately 30 miles west of present-day Montgomery."

The Tallapoosa were forcibly relocated to Indian Territory with other Muscogee people in the early 19th century.

== Namesakes ==
Tallapoosa name first appears on settlers maps in Georgia.

Tallapoosa, Georgia where the Tallapoosa River begins is named after the tribe.

There is a Historical Marker named "Seven Chestnuts" where Creek tribes had council meetings under seven chestnut trees located in Tallapoosa.

Another nearby Historic Marker marks the trail Creek Indians traveled named "Sandtown Trail".

Tallapoosa County, Alabama is named after the tribe.

== See also ==
- Coosa chiefdom
