= Joseph Blake (governor) =

American politician

11th Governor of Carolina
- In office November 1694 – 17 August 1695
- Monarch: William III
- Preceded by: Thomas Smith
- Succeeded by: John Archdale
- In office 29 October 1696 – 7 September 1700
- Monarch: William III
- Preceded by: John Archdale
- Succeeded by: James Moore

Personal details
- Born: 1663 England
- Died: 7 September 1700 (aged 36–37)
- Parent: Vice Admiral Benjamin Blake

Joseph Blake (died 1700), the son of Vice Admiral Benjamin Blake and nephew of English General at Sea Robert Blake, served as the governor of Carolina in 1694 and from 1696 to his death in 1700.

== Biography ==
Joseph Blake was born in 1663, in England. He was the son of Vice Admiral Benjamin Blake and nephew of Lord Proprietor, John Archdale. To early 1680s, he emigrated to Carolina. In 1685, Joseph Blake was appointed a Deputy by his Archdale. During a time, he was member of the Executive Councils. Late, he was named as a Deputy of Peter Colleton, 2nd Baronet. On 29 October 1694, he was appointed governor of colonial South Carolina by the council, and he kept the charge until his death, on 7 September 1700.

Blake married two times: The first of them was with Deborah Morton, who was daughter of Governor Joseph Morton, marrying with him before 1685. The second was Elizabeth Axtell, who had a son, Joseph Blake Jr. He had several lands: "Plainsfield", located on the Stono River, which is where he died and was buried; Newington Plantation, located in Dorchester County; and "Pawlet" in Colleton County, South Carolina.

== See also ==
- List of colonial governors of South Carolina
