= Chacato =

Native American tribe in 17th-century Florida

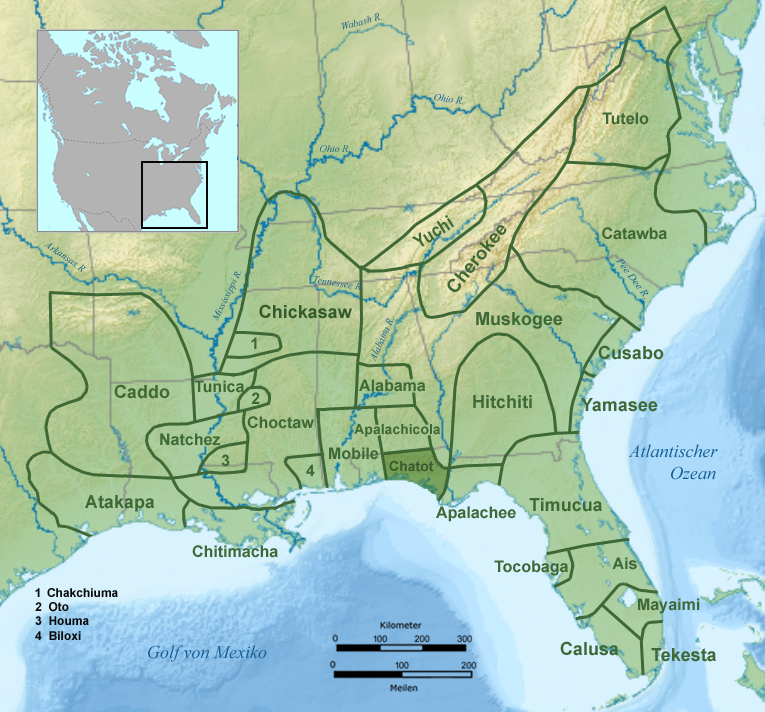
- Tribal territory of Chacato during the 16th century highlighted

Total population
- Extinct as a tribe

Regions with significant populations
- United States (Florida)

Languages
- Muskogean

Religion
- Native, Christianity

Related ethnic groups
- Apalachee, Amacano, Chine, Pensacola, and other Muskogean peoples

The Chacatos were a Native American people who lived in the upper Apalachicola River and Chipola River basins in what is now Florida in the 17th century. The Spanish established two missions in Chacato villages in 1674. As a result of attempts by the missionaries to impose full observance of Christian rites and morals on the newly converted Chacatos, many of them rebelled, trying to murder one of the missionaries. Many of the rebels fled to Tawasa, while others joined the Chiscas, who had become openly hostile to the Spanish. Other Chacatos moved to missions in or closer to Apalachee Province, abandoning their villages west of the Apalachicola River.

In the late 17th century, one village of Chacatos moved from the center of Apalachee Province to near where the Chattahoochee and Flint rivers join to form the Apalachicola River, close to a Sabacola village and mission. That village was abandoned after it was attacked by Apalachicolas and others. Other Chacatos lived in small settlements scattered across the Florida panhandle, and in Tawasa and Tiquepache villages in Alabama.

After the destruction of the Apalachee Province missions by the English of the Province of Carolina and their Native American allies in 1704, the surviving Chacatos moved west with Apalachees and other peoples of the province, settling in the vicinity of Pensacola and Mobile bays. Some of those Chacatos may have been absorbed into the Choctaw nation. When West Florida was transferred to Great Britain in 1763, other Chacatos moved west to Louisiana.

== Name ==
In the 17th and earliest 18th centuries, when they lived in the eastern panhandle of Florida, the Spanish usually called the people "Chacato", and less often, "Chacta", "Chacto", "Chata", and "Chato". "Chatot" is the name commonly used in English sources through most of the 20th century, although scholars have recently used "Chacato". (Note: "Chato" was also the name of part of the Matagalpa tribe of Honduras.) After they moved west to the area around Mobile Bay, and later to west of the Mississippi River in Louisiana, they were often also called "Chactoo", "Chacchou", "Chaetoo" and "Chattoo". Other forms of the name have included "Chacâto", "Chaqto", and "Chactot". Galloway notes that chato is Spanish for "flat" or "roman-nosed", and speculates that the Spanish called the people that because they practiced artificial cranial deformation.

Milanich notes that confusion of the names "Chatot" and "Chactato" with the Choctaw of Mississippi may have been responsible for the name of Choctawhatchee Bay. Galloway says that the Chacatos and Choctaws should not be confused, that the names are phonetically distinct, and were consistently used to refer to distinct peoples in the 18th century. Swanton states that the Choctawhatchee River in Florida and Bayou Chattique, Choctaw Point, and Choctaw Swamp near Mobile are probably named after the Chacato.

== Language ==
The Chacato spoke a Muskogean language, which may have been the same as that of several other peoples in western Florida, including the Amacano, Chine, (Note: At least one Spanish source referred to "cacique (chief) Chine" as a Chacato. Swanton took that to mean that the Chine people were Chacato.) Pacara, and Pensacola peoples. Swanton states that the language of the Chacato is "undoubtedly" a member of the southern division of the Muskogean stock. While it has been suggested that the Chacato were part of the Apalachee people, Hann notes that the Spanish used interpreters to translate from Chacato to Apalachee, and other interpreters to translate from Apalachee to Spanish. Martin states that suggestions that the Chacato language is related to Choctaw are unreliable.

== Origin ==
The Chacato may have lived along one or more rivers flowing into Choctawhatchee Bay. A map in Martin shows the Chacato occupying an area along the Gulf Coast of Florida between the Apalachicola and Choctawhatchee rivers. At the time of first contact with the Spanish, the people they called Chacato lived in the upper part of the Chipola River basin and the adjacent section of the Appalachicola River in the area of the Fort Walton culture, primarily in what is now Jackson County, Florida. (Note: Swanton states that some of the Chacato lived in southwestern Georgia.) A number of archaeological sites in the area, including the Waddells Mill Pond Site, a fortified village site with two mounds, may have been occupied by the ancestors of the historic Chacato. Pottery found in the historic Chacato settlement area is more closely related to that of Apalachee Province than to that of the peoples of the Pensacola and Mobile bays. The subsistence economy of the Chacatos also resembled that of the Apalachees, rather than the peoples to their west.

The Chacatos appear to be an exception to their neighbors in that inheritance of the chieftainship did not necessarily pass to the offspring of the previous chief's eldest sister. The Chacato, along with the Apalachees and Muscogees, applied the title usinulo (beloved son) to one of the chief's sons. The Chacatos also shared use of the leadership titles inija (second-in-command) and chacal (assistant to an inija) with the Apalachee and the Timucua peoples.

== Spanish contact and early missions ==
The first mention of the Chacato in Spanish records was in 1638, when a representative of the Spanish governor of Florida was able to stop a war between the allied Chacato, Apalachicola, and Yamassee peoples, and the Apalachees. The next governor visited the Chacato and Apalachicola Province in 1646, when both peoples requested missionaries. The Chacatos requested missionaries again in the 1660s.

There are isolated Spanish reports of people migrating into the Chacato and Apalachee provinces in the 1660s and 1670s. They were described as "warrior Indians, their faces striped, and who use firearms". The Spanish called some of the invaders "Chichimecos" (probably Westos). Hann suggests that most of the migrants were Tama and Yamasee.

Two missions were established among the Chacato in June 1674. The first mission, San Carlos Borromeo, was in the principal Chacato village of Achercatane (later listed as Yatcatane), four days journey northwest of Apalachee Province. A second mission, San Nicolás de Tolentino, was established in the village of Atanchia. (Note: A Spanish account indicates that the site of the San Nicolás mission was close to a cave, which may have been Rock Arch Cave in Florida Caverns State Park.) A third village, with a visita (Note: A visita typically was a church that did not have a resident missionary.) called San Antonio by the Spanish, may have been located in what is now Houston County, Alabama.

In the winter of 1675, Bishop Gabriel Díaz Vara y Calderón estimated San Carlos's population to be just over 100, and San Nicolas's just over 30. Later that year, acting deputy governor Andrés Pérez estimated San Carlos's population to be about 300, and that of San Nicolas, about 100. Hann suggests that the differences may be due to many of the people of the villages being on hunting or fishing trips at the time of the bishop's visit. Another report places about 80 men at San Antonio in that year.

The missionaries at the two missions claimed to have converted more than 300 Chacatos, including the chiefs of the settlements, to Christianity by late September. Three warriors complained that they were being pressured to convert, and threatened to have Chiscas (Note: The Chisca chiefdom was located in southwestern Virginia and southeastern Tennessee in the middle of the 16th century when the Hernando de Soto and Juan Pardo expeditions passed through the area. By the end of the century, Chiscas had migrated into Florida. A Chisca settlement was at the mouth of the Apalachicola River by 1661.) living in the Chacato villages and in their own nearby village make trouble for the missionaries and converts. The Spanish lieutenant-governor in Apalachee Province took some soldiers and 25 Apalachees armed with harquebuses to the Chacato missions. The three reluctant warriors were nominally converted to Christianity and the Chiscas were expelled from the Chacato villages while the Spanish-Apalachee party was there.

== Conspiracy ==
In the summer of 1675, three Chacato warriors, who may have been the same as those who threatened trouble the previous year, conspired against the missionaries. They initially claimed only to want to expel Fray Barreda, the missionary at San Carlos and the sole missionary in the Chacato lands at the time, but it was soon revealed that the plan was to kill Fray Barreda. One of the conspirators, Juan Fernández de Diocsale, was the son of a Chisca woman and had been chief of the village where San Carlos was located. He resented being forced by Barreda to attend mass and to give up three of his four wives. Another conspirator, Ubabesa, had been scolded by Barreda in Sunday mass for having an affair with a Christian woman while her husband was away. Other alleged conspirators including Chacatos and Chiscas were later named in a Spanish inquiry.

The conspiracy quickly gained support in the community. Hann notes that this may partly be because of discontent over pressure on the Chacato from the missionaries to strictly adhere to Christian standards. Another factor was threats from the conspirators to have their Chisca friends kill anyone who did not support the conspiracy. Diocsale also falsely claimed to be supported by the Apalachicola. The Spanish found little evidence, however, that any Chisca had been involved in the conspiracy. (Note: The Spanish, believing that the Chiscas were friendly, had asked them to not support the Chacatos in their dispute with the Spanish.) The conspirators planned to seek refuge at Tawasa after killing Barreda.

== Attack on a missionary ==
The conspirators spoke to Chacato leaders about expelling Barreda, but the leaders supported Barreda. When the conspirators then revealed that they intended to kill Barreda, the Chacato leaders placed guards to protect Barreda. Barreda sent a plea for help to the Spanish authorities in San Luis, the capitol of Apalachee Province. Some of the loyal Chacatos defected to the conspirators and those remaining loyal advised Barreda to flee to the mission of Santa Cruz de Sabacola, on the Apalachicola River. Barreda's guides were chosen by an official who had secretly joined the conspirators, and he told them to kill Barreda after they had left San Carlos. The attack failed, although Barreda was wounded. Barreda killed one of the attackers with his musket and escaped to Santa Cruz.

In the absence of the deputy governor for Apalachee Province, the acting deputy governor, Andrés Pérez, sent a few Spanish soldiers and Apalachees to help guard Barreda. On hearing that the number of loyalists guarding Barreda was shrinking, Pérez sent 26 archers after the first group. Later the same day word reached San Luis that Barreda had fled to Sabacola. Pérez sent 11 gunmen after the earlier party with orders to bring Barreda and Fray Juan Ocon, the missionary at Sabacola, back to San Luis. After the failed attempt on Barreda's life, many Chacato, including essentially all of San Antonio, most of the population of San Nicolás, and an unknown number of people from San Carlos, fled to Tawasa.

== Amnesty and punishment ==
The deputy governor for Apalachee, Juan Fernandez de Hita y Salazar, soon returned to San Luis, and the governor of Florida, Pablo de Hita y Salazar sent a few more soldiers to Apalachee. Before the Spanish could decide on a course of action, Fray Juan de Paiva, the missionary assigned to San Nicolás de Tolentino, persuaded Pérez to spare the lives of the conspirators who had fled to Tawasa if they returned to San Carlos. Some of the exiles returned to San Carlos, but others rejected the amnesty and remained in Tawasa.

The Spanish conducted inquiries into the revolt is late 1675 and again 1676. At the first inquiry, the Spanish honored the promise to spare the lives of the conspirators, but Diocsale and two others were taken to San Luis for further trial. Diocsale was exiled from San Carlos for life and held in house-arrest in St. Augustine while the other two were sentenced to four years of labor for the colonial government.

== The Chisca threat ==
In 1676, the Chisca moved their village from near the eastern mouth of the Apalachicola River to the Choctawhatchee River. After the move, the Chisca began openly raiding missions in Apalachee and Timucua provinces. While the Chacato conspirator Diocsale was held under house arrest in St. Augustine, he was allowed visitors. Informants told Spanish officials that he had sent messages by those visitors inciting the Chisca to attack Spanish missions. Apalachees were killed in raids on Ivitachuco, Patale, Bacuqua, Escambé, and Ayubale, although some of the raids may have been carried out by Yamassees.

In an inquiry in 1676 into recent attacks on missions, Diocsale finally admitted to inciting the Chiscas to make war on Christians, and was sentenced to exile in Mexico. Testimony was also given that the Chiscas had conducted the attacks on the missions, and were fortifying their village on the Choctawhatchee River in preparation for further warfare against the Spanish missions. In that inquiry, Miguel, chief of San Nicolás, had been accused of being one of the principal conspirators in the 1675 revolt, and of going to St. Augustine to help Diocsale escape from arrest, but was released because of lack of credible witnesses. On being released from custody. Miguel returned to his village, recruited some of his men, and joined the Chiscas. He was also accused of helping recruit some Pensacolas to join the Chiscas.

There is no record of the missionaries returning to the Chacato missions after the revolt. Chacatos were still living at San Carlos in early 1676, but the Chisca attacked the village soon after, and both San Carlos and San Nicolas were abandoned before September 1677. At least part of the Chacato people had moved into Apalachee Province, settling half a league west of the Apalachee capitol at San Luis. Chacatos were among the first people to take refuge in Apalachee Province. They were incorporated into Apalachee society as tributaries. The mission of San Carlos de los Chatacos was still located near San Luis in 1683. It was reported to have a population of 216 in 1681, apparently not including children; most of the adults were Christians. Chacatos from that settlement were drafted by the Spanish as guides for an expedition in 1677 that destroyed the Chisca settlement on the Choctawhatchee River.

== Beyond Apalachee Province ==
Sometime between 1683 and 1685, the Chacato left the site near San Luis and moved to the Apalachicola River, near a Sabacola village and mission, Santa Cruz de Sabacola. The Sabacola of that village had recently moved downriver to be closer to Apalachee Province, so that a missionary could be placed with them. The mission of San Carlos de los Chacatos was in the vicinity of the Sabacola mission, but was listed as being in Apalachee Province.

In 1686, the chief of Tawasa visited Apalachee, bringing 24 Christian Chacatos who had been in Tawasa since 1675. Other Chacatos may have returned to Apalachee from Tawasa after that. Marcos Delgado, a Spanish soldier who traveled to Tawasa that year, reported that Chacatos lived in a village called Okchai in Tiquepache Province, beyond Tawasa. Such returning Chacatos may have made up the 350 people in the mission of San Nicolás de los Chacatos that appeared around that time. Some Chacatos may also have been among the some 150 people at the Sabacola mission of San Carlos de Çabacola. The Sabacola mission was listed as Çabacola Chuba (Big Savacola) in 1690. The Sabacola mission was gone by 1693, when the Chacato village on the Apalachicola was mentioned as the "most outlying mission" in the region.

Just as Chacatos had sought refuge at Tawasa in 1675, Tawasa sought refuge with the Chacatos in the mid-1690s, and stayed until the Chacatos abandoned Apalachee Province. The Tawasa remained west of Apalachee Province, and were not converted to Christianity. They dispersed after the destruction of the Apalachee Missions.

In 1693, Laureano de Torres y Ayala, waiting to take up his post of governor of Spanish Florida, led the land portion of an expedition to assess Pensacola Bay for a new settlement. Five Chacatos and five Apalachees went to Pensacola with Torres y Ayala to care for 100 horses he bought in Apalachee Province. (Note: Chacatos had a reputation for being skillful with horses.) At Pensacola Bay, the expedition found 20 Chacatos living in two small camps, but no Pensacolas.

In 1701, the Spanish established a lookout post on St. Joseph Point on the end of the St. Joseph Peninsula, with a small settlement on the mainland opposite the point to support the lookout post, where some Chacatos lived. Two churches were established, with one named "Our Lady of Guadaloupe" serving the Chacatos. The lookout post and settlement were shortly abandoned, perhaps within months, but certainly by 1704.

== Attacks ==
Sabacolas participated with Apalachicolas and Tiquepaches in an attack on the Chacato mission in 1694, killing five Chacatos and taking 42 Chacatos to the Province of Carolina to sell as slaves. (Note: The English were buying Chacato slaves from the Shawnee by 1684. In 1681, three Indians captured by the English of the Province of Carolina and sent to the West Indies as slaves were identified as "Chattoee".) After the attack, the Chacatos retreated to Escambé in Apalachee Province. The Chacatos requested that they be allowed to return to the site near San Luis where they had lived from 1676 until after 1683. A contract with the Apalachee chief to allow that was drawn up, but there is no record that the Chacatos returned to that place. Chacatos did remain in Apalachee Province until 1704, however.

Chacatos and Apalachees worked for the Spanish on building the new settlement at Pensacola Bay in 1698. They may have also helped drive cattle from Apalachee Province to Pensacola Bay. In the winter of 1698–1699, 40 Chacatos led by a Spaniard were on a buffalo hunt when they encountered 24 men from Tasquique travelling with goods to trade at San Luis. The Chacatos attacked the Tasquiques while they slept, killing 16, and taking the trade goods. Chacatos joined a force of 800 Spaniards and Apalachees that intended to attack the former Apalachicola Province towns (the English called them the Ochise Creeks) in central Georgia in 1702. The Apalachicola towns ambused the Spanish-Apalachee force in the Battle of Flint River, killing or capturing 500 of them.

Attacks by the English from the Province of Carolina and their Indian allies in 1704 destroyed many of the Spanish missions in Apalachee Province, with the attackers killing or taking away many of the people living at those missions. Residents of other missions survived the attacks, but soon abandoned their villages. Immediately after Ayubale was attacked in 1704, Apalachicolas in the attacking group demanded that Chacatos be turned over to them in exchange for Spaniards captured in the raid, but the Spanish refused to do so. Dubcovsky says the demand by the Apalachicolas was in retaliation for the incident in which 40 Chacatos killed 16 Tasquiques five years earlier. Dudcovsky also says the raiders struck Ayubale first because that is where the Chacatos had returned after the killings.

Following the attack on the missions, the province was low on supplies. In early June 1704, Solano sent a delegation of Chacatos and Apalachees to Pensacola seeking help. Chacatos were included because they knew the land between Apalachee and Pensacola Bay and had connections in that area. Hearing about the delegation from a spy, the Alabamas sent a party to intercept them, but the delegation reached Pensacola safely. When they reached Pensacola, rather than asking for supplies for Apalachee Province, they asked for permission to continue to Mobile. The governor of Pensacola, Andrés de Arriola, refused them permission to go to Mobile, but allowed them to stay in Pensacola rather than returning to Apalachee. More of the Chacato, Tawasa, and Apalachee people who had survived the attacks on the missions soon moved to Pensacola. Some of the Apalachees and Chacatos drove cattle with them to Pensacola in July 1704.

== Refuge at Mobile and dispersal ==
Most of the Chacatos and the Apalachees from San Luis and Escambe who had fled to Pensacola continued on to the French settlement at Mobile. Between 200 and 250 Chacatos arrived in Mobile in 1704. Some of the Chacatos seeking refuge at Mobile were reported to be from St. Joseph Bay. The French placed the Chacatos on a site called "Oigonets" (Note: Oigonots was later known as "Choctaw Point".) at the mouth of the Mobile River. In 1711, the French moved their settlement from its original site at Old Mobile to Oigonets, and moved the Chacatos to Dog River on Mobile Bay. The French regarded the Chacatos as warriors and good Catholics. They understood that the Chacatos and Apalachees spoke different languages, but noted that both had adopted many Spanish words. Some Chacatos may have lived with Apalachees. Swanton repeats population estimates of 250 Chacato men when they were first settled at Mobile, but only 40 men in 1725-1726, and 30 men in 1817.

Some Chacatos and Apalachees stayed at Pensacola for another year or two, with 80 or more workers receiving rations from the Spanish presidio in 1707. That year food shortages resulted in a reduction in the ration and another 150 Chacatos and 100 Apalachees left for Mobile.

When the British took over West Florida in 1763, most of the Chacatos, along with other small tribes that had settled around Mobile, moved to Spanish Louisiana. The Chacatos, Pensacolas, Capinans, Washas, Chawashas, and Pascagoulas living near Mobile had a total of 251 men at that time. Some Chacatos may have remained near Mobile. A small tribe known as "Chatos" was reported to have lived on the Mississippi coast and been absorbed into the Six Towns division of the Choctaws. A Chacato was reportedly mentioned in a Mobile newspaper in the early 1850s. Chacatos, Biloxis, and Pascagoulas totaled about 100 men after the move to Louisiana. Chacatos were reported at Rapides in 1773, on the Red River in 1796, at Bayou Boeuf in 1803–1805, and on the Sabine River in 1817. Some groups from the tribes that had taken refuge in Louisiana settled in the Red River area and survived there into the 20th century.

== Sources ==
- Bushnell, Amy Turner (2022), "Debitage of the Shatter Zone: Indoctrination, Asylum, and the Law of Towns in the Provinces of Florida", in da Cruz, Miguel Dantas (ed.), Petitioning in the Atlantic World, c. 1500–1840: Empires, Revolutions and Social Movements, Cham: Springer International Publishing, pp. 137–155, doi:10.1007/978-3-030-98534-9_7, ISBN 978-3-030-98534-9
- Dubcovsky, Alejandra (2017). ""All of Us Will Have to Pay for These Activities": Colonial and Native Narratives of the 1704 Attack on Ayubale". Native South. 10: 1–18. doi:10.1353/nso.2017.0001. ISSN 2152-4025.
- Dubcovsky, Alejandra (April 2018). "Defying Indian Slavery: Apalachee Voice and Spanish Sources in the Eighteenth-Century Southeast". The William and Mary Quarterly. 3rd. 75 (2): 295–322. doi:10.5309/willmaryquar.75.2.0295.
- Galloway, Patricia. "Choctaw Genesis, 1500-1700". Nebraska Press.
- Goddard, Ives; Galloway, Patricia; Jeter, Marvin D.; Waselkov, Gregory A.; Worth, John E. (2004). "Small Tribes of the Western Southeast". In Fogelson, Raymond D. (ed.). Handbook of North American Indians, Volume 14 Southest. Washington, D.C.: Smithsonian Institution. pp. 174–190.
- Gregory, Hiram F. (2004). "Survival and Maintenance Among Louisiana Tribes". In Fogelson (ed.). Handbook of North American Indians Volume 14 Languages (Raymond D. ed.). Washington, D.C.: Smithsonian Institution. pp. 653–658. ISBN 978-0160723001.
- Halbert, H. S. (1902). "The Small Indian Tribes of Mississippi". Report of the Mississippi Historical Commission, Volume V.
- Hann, John H. (1992). "Political Leadership among the Natives of Spanish Florida". The Florida Historical Quarterly. 71 (2): 188–208. ISSN 0015-4113. JSTOR 30150360.
- Hann, John H. (1996). "Late Seventeenth-Century Forebears of the Lower Creeks and Seminoles". Southeastern Archaeology. 15 (1): 66–80. ISSN 0734-578X. JSTOR 40713051.
- Hann, John H. (2006). The Native American World Beyond Apalachee. University Press of Florida. ISBN 9-780-8130-2982-5.
- Johnson, Patrick Lee (2013). "Apalachee Identity on the Gulf Coast Frontier". Native South. 6: 110–141. doi:10.1353/nso.2013.0004 – via Project MUSE.
- Juricek, John T. (1964). "The Westo Indians". Ethnohistory. 11 (2): 134–173. doi:10.2307/480855. ISSN 0014-1801. JSTOR 480855.
- Lankford, George E. (2004). "Chacato, Pensacola, Tohomé, Naniaba, and Mobila". In Fogelson, Raymond D. (ed.). Handbook of North American Languages, Volume 14 Southeast. Washington, D.C.: Smithsonian Institution. pp. 664–668.
- Martin, Jack B. (2004). "Languages". In Fogelson (ed.). Handbook of North American Indians Volume 14 Languages (Raymond D. ed.). Washington, D.C.: Smithsonian Institution. pp. 68–86. ISBN 978-0160723001.
- McEwan, Bonnie G. (2004). "Apalachee and Neighboring Groups". In Fogelson (ed.). Handbook of North American Indians Volume 14 Languages (Raymond D. ed.). Washington, D.C.: Smithsonian Institution. pp. 669–676. ISBN 978-0160723001.
- Milanich, Jerald T. (1995). Florida Indians and the Invasion from Europe (paperback ed.). University Press of Florida. ISBN 978-0-8130-1636-8.
- Saccente, Julie Rogers; White, Nancy Marie (2015). "Fort San José, a Remote Spanish Outpost in Northwest Florida, 1700–1721". In Funari, Pedro Paulo A.; Senatore, Maria Ximena (eds.). Archaeology of Culture Contact and Colonialism in Spanish and Portuguese America. Cham: Springer International Publishing. pp. 297–311. doi:10.1007/978-3-319-08069-7_16. ISBN 978-3-319-08069-7.
- Swanton, John R. (1969) [1952]. The Indian Tribes of North America (Reprint ed.). Washington, D.C.: The Smithsonian Institution. ISBN 978-0-874-74179-7.
