= Chine people =

Native American people in 17th century Florida

The Chine people were a group of Native American people living in Apalachee Province in Spanish Florida from the early 1670s until the end of the 17th century. They are believed to have spoken the same language as the Chatot, Amacano, Pacara, and Pensacola people, and have been described as a band of the Chatot people. They were served by a series of Spanish missions in the last quarter of the 17th century.

== Origins ==
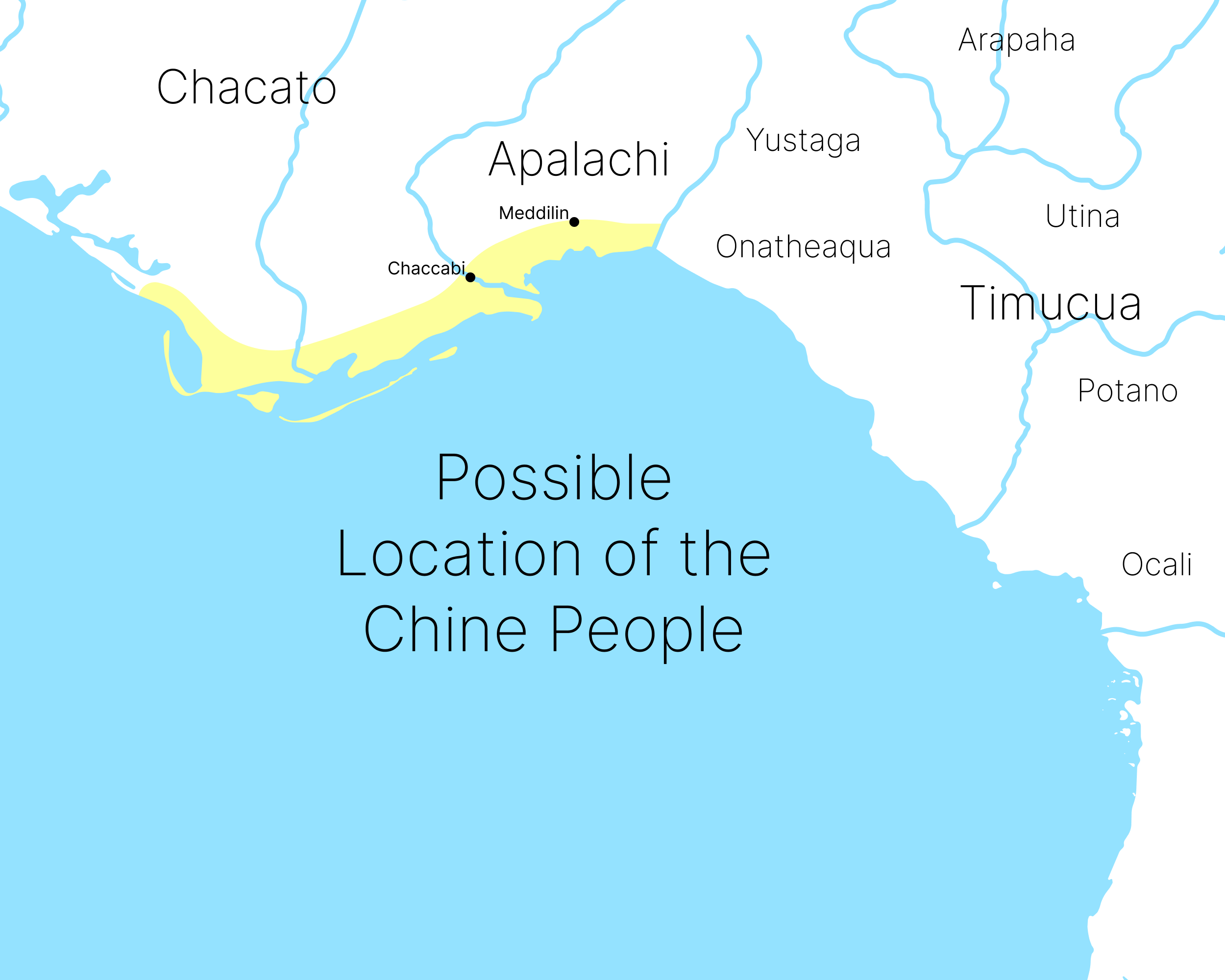
A Map of the Location of the Chine Peoples.

The Chine may have migrated into Apalachee Province in the early 1670s. All of the peoples living beyond Apalachee Province in the 17th century, except for the Chiscas, spoke the same or a closely related language, as did the Chatot, but the Spanish viewed the Chatot and Chine peoples as separate bands. All of those people (Amacano, Chatot, Chine, Pacara, and Pensacola) were likely descended from people of the Fort Walton and, possibly, the Lamar cultures.

The Chine first appeared in Spanish records in 1674, when they were recorded living in association with Amacano and Pacara people in the town of Chaccabi in the southern part of Apalachee Province near Apalachee Bay. (Note: Chaccabi was described as being on the road from San Luis, the capital of Apalachee Province, to the sea. The distance from San Luis was given as about ten or eleven leagues. John Hann argues that the uncertainty about the distance expressed in the Spanish account indicates that Chaccabi was not on the road to San Marcos, the main port for Apalachee Province. Hann also argues that Chaccabi was on the Rio Chachave that is on a 1683 Spanish map, on the western end of Apalachee Bay between the St. Marks River and the Ocklockonee River. Hann identifies Rio Chachave with Spring Creek (30.08°N 84.33°W).) The three people were described as allies, speaking the same language, but as separate "nations". The Chine were probably the most numerous of the three peoples in Chaccabi.

== Missions ==
Chaccabi had a mission founded in April, 1674, dedicated to St. Peter the Apostle (San Pedro), to serve the Chine, Amacano, and Pacara people of the town, who were gradually being converted to Christianity. The three peoples of Chaccabi had apparently moved to a new site known as "the place of the Chines" by the next year, when Gabriel Díaz Vara Calderón, bishop of Santiago de Cuba, founded the mission of Assumpcíon del Puerto on February 2, 1675 to serve them. (Note: Hann places the new mission of Assumpcíon del Puerto at just six leagues from San Luis, on the road to the coast. A map in Gannon shows the mission in the northwest part of Apalachee Province.) That mission does not appear in Spanish records after 1675. The mission, identified as "Assumpcíon de Nuestra Señora", was reported to have 300 residents in 1675, which may be an undercount.

The Chines may have moved more than once after 1675. A mission of "San Pedro de los Chines" is on a mission list from 1680, and "San Pedro de Medellin" was reported in 1681 (Medellin was close to the headwaters of the Wakulla River on a 1683 map). A mission named "San Antonio de Chines" was listed in 1694, which Hann says may be the result of a move to a location closer to San Luis. A census in 1681 counted 158 adults. A list in 1689 gave the population as 30 families. Another list in 1697 stated the "Place of the Chines" was one league from the mission La Purificación de Tama, inland from the mission San Martín de Tomole. (Note: La Purificación de Tama was one-half league to one league from San Luis in the 1670s, and one-half league from San Antonio de Chines in 1697. The 1697 list of missions places San Antonio de Chines between the Tama mission and San Luis.)

== Pilots and guides ==
The Chine were known to the Spanish for their experience in traveling along the Gulf of Mexico coast by canoe from Apalachee Bay to Pensacola Bay (the Spanish may have had contact with the Pensacola people through the Chine before 1677). The Spanish used Chines as pilots and guides for at least three expeditions west of Apalachee Province. In 1777, the Spanish and Apalachee sent 190 men to attack a Chisca town near the Choctawhatchee River in retaliation for Chisca attacks on the Apalchee and their neighbors. Chines and Chatots were drafted by the Spanish/Apalachee force to serve as guides to the Chisca town.

In 1685, the French explorer La Salle founded a settlement on the Texas coast. On receiving word of that settlement, the Viceroy of New Spain ordered a search for it. A search party, led by Juan Enríquez Barroto, left San Marcos in 1686, using Chine pilots because they were familiar with the coast as far west as Mobile Bay. In 1693, Laureano de Torres y Ayala, governor of Spanish Florida, led an expedition by boat along the coast from San Marcos to Mobile Bay. Chief Chine (who the Spanish identified as a Chatot) and his son served as pilots for the Spanish. (Note: When the governor's ship passed the mouth of the Ocklockonee River (Spanish Rio Lagna, "Yellow River") on that expedition, Chief Chine said the river was "called Claraquachine in the Apalachine tongue". It is not known what significance "-chine" has in either name.)

== Fate ==
In 1702, the Chines were listed as heathens living in Apalachee Province, along with Amacano, Savacola, Chatot, Tabasa, and Catase (Ocatase) people. Native American people allied with the English of the Province of Carolina mounted a series of attacks on the Apalachee and other peoples associated with the Spanish, culminating in 1704 in what has been called the Apalachee massacre. The fate of the Chines in that event is not clear. Some Chines (identified as Ocatoses) may have been carried off by the raiders. Some may have been with the Chatots that went west with Apalachees to the coast between Pensacola Bay and Mobile Bay (people called Ocatoses lived next to the Presidio Santa Maria de Galve on Pensacola Bay in 1707).

== Sources ==
- Gannon, Michael V. (1965). The Cross in the Sand. University Presses of Florida. ISBN 0-8130-0776-3.
- Geiger, Maynard (1940). "Biographical Dictionary of the Franciscans in Spanish Florida and Cuba (1528-1841)". Franciscan Studies. 21 (21): V–IX, XI–XII, 1–117, 119–140. JSTOR 43900081.
- Hann, John H. (April 1990). "Summary Guide to Spanish Florida Missions and Visitas with Churches in the Sixteenth and Seventeenth Centuries". The Americas. 46 (4): 417–513. doi:10.2307/1006866. JSTOR 1006866.
- Hann, John H. (2006). The Native American World Beyond Apalachee. University Press of Florida. ISBN 9-780-8130-2982-5.
- Hann, John H.; McEwan, Bonnie G. (1998). The Apalachee Indians and Mission San Luis. University Press of Florida. ISBN 0-8130-1564-2.
- Milanich, Jerald T. (1995). Florida Indians and the Invasion from Europe (paperback ed.). University Press of Florida. ISBN 978-0-8130-1636-8.
