= Chisca =

Extinct Native American tribe originating in Tennessee

Total population
- Extinct as a tribe. Descendants became Yuchis or merged into Shawnee and Muscogee

Regions with significant populations
- United States (Eastern Tennessee, Southwestern Virginia, Spanish Florida)

Languages
- Yuchi language

Religion
- Indigenous religion

The Chisca were a tribe of Native Americans living in present-day eastern Tennessee and southwestern Virginia in the 16th century. Their descendants, the Yuchi, lived in present-day Alabama, Georgia, and Florida between the 17th and early 19th centuries, and were removed to Indian Territory in the 1830s.

The Hernando de Soto expedition heard of, and may have had brief contact with, the Chisca in 1540. The Juan Pardo expeditions of 1566 and 1568 encountered the Chisca and fought them.

By early in the 17th century, Chisca people were present in several parts of Spanish Florida, engaged at various times and places in alternately friendly or hostile relations with the Spanish and the peoples of the Spanish mission system. After the capture of a fortified Chisca town by the Spanish and Apalachee in 1677, some Chisca took refuge in northern Tennessee, where they were absorbed into the Shawnee, and in Muscogee towns in Alabama. Around the turn of the 18th century, some Chisca, by then generally called Yuchi, joined the Apalachicola Province towns that resettled around Ochisi Creek in central Georgia, thus becoming part of the "Lower Towns of the Muscogee Confederacy". A few Chiscas remained in western Florida into the middle of the 18th century.

== History ==
=== 16th century ===
In 1540, the Hernando de Soto expedition entered the southern Appalachian Mountains in North Carolina. At the town of Coste at the mouth of the Little Tennessee River, de Soto was told of the "Chisca" province that was north of Coste and produced copper and "another finer but softer metal of the same color". (Note: Teresa Martin and Luisa Menéndez, Native American women who had been taken from the Appalachian Mountains by the Spanish in the 1560s, recalled in 1600 that the people of their respective towns had obtained gold ornaments from the Chiscas, and described the Chisca (in what Hann [2006] calls "mythic terms") as "white-skinned, blue-eyed, red-haired, and [wearing] clothing".) According to de Sotos's account, he sent out a small exploration party near the Nolichucky River in the vicinity of the upper Tennessee River, where they were attacked and defeated by Chisca warriors. (Note: Sampeck, et al. state that it is unlikely that the town of Chisca was located along the Nolichucky River, and calculate, given that de Soto's men were gone for 10 days in very difficult terrain, that Chisca was about 25 leagues (87 miles [140 km]) from Coste.)

The Spanish established the first capital of Spanish Florida at Santa Elena, on Parris Island, South Carolina. In late 1566, Captain Juan Pardo departed from Santa Elena to explore the interior of what is now the Southeastern United States. Pardo's expedition reached Joara (at a site about 20 miles east of Marion, North Carolina) in late January 1567, where they built Fort San Juan. Pardo left Sergeant Hernando Moyana in charge of the fort when he continued his journey of exploration before returning to Santa Elena. In March of that year, Moyana reported to Pardo that he had fought a chief named Chisca, killing 1,000 Chiscas and burning 50 houses. Shortly afterwards, Moyana was challenged by another chief (assumed to also be a Chisca by Hudson, et al.). In response, Moyana marched for four days with 19 Spanish soldiers and an unspecified number of Joaras, and captured a palisaded town, killing a claimed 1,500 inhabitants and burning the town. Moyana then marched another four days to Chiaha. Chiaha was also surrounded by a palisade, and Moyana settled for building a small fort nearby. The towns destroyed by Pardo and his soldiers are identified in Spanish sources as Maniatique and Guapere. Luisa Mendez, a Native American woman who was married to a Spanish soldier, was identified as the "cacica" (female chief) of the town of Guanaytique or Manaytique. Mendez's description of brine springs in the area has been taken as evidence that Maniatique was near Saltville, Virginia on the Holston River. On the other hand, DePratter, et al. place the Chisca towns on the upper Nolichucky River or the Watauga River, or both.

People that the Spanish called Chisca were in the western part of what is now the state of Florida by late in the 16th century. A Chacato chief, Juan de Diocsale, who had a Chisca mother, was born by 1595. (Chacato Province was roughly coterminous with the Chipola River basin in what is now Jackson County, Florida.)

=== 17th century ===
By the 1620s, Spanish records indicated that many Chiscas were living in the area. When Juan de Salinas was governor of Spanish Florida between 1618 and 1624, he sent soldiers 60 leagues to punish Chiscas and Chichimecos for robbing and killing Christian natives in Timucua and Apalachee provinces. In 1639, the Spanish unsuccessfully invited some Chiscas to settle near a Timucuan mission 10 leagues from St. Augustine, in hopes of using them to hunt fugitives from missions and defend the Florida colony. The Chisca roamed freely throughout Spanish Florida in the 1640s. In 1647, Chiscas were involved in the Apalachee Rebellion. After the Spanish suppressed the rebellion, Chiscas ambushed Spanish soldiers and Christian natives in neighboring Yustaga Province. The Spanish then ordered Chiscas, including some that had reached the St. Johns River valley, to settle in towns under Christian caciques, but the Chiscas remained "rebellious" in 1650 and 1651, killing some mission inhabitants, and kidnapping others. The Chisca had several settlements near the St. Johns River, from which they raided Timucua missions and the La Chua ranch. In 1651, the Spanish succeeded in driving the Chisca out of Timucua province.

==== Among the Chacato and Apalachee ====
Some Chisca had settled at the mouth of the Apalachicola River, near Apalachee Province, as early as 1661, and relations with the Spanish were friendly enough that they tried to recruit some Chiscas to serve as interpreters for questioning some Chichimecos held prisoner by the Spanish, and, in 1675, asked the Chiscas to not support the Chacatos in their dispute with the Spanish. In 1675, the Chisca living near Apalachee Province warned the Spanish that the English were urging the Chichimeco to attack Spanish missions and other native groups that had submitted to the Spanish king. On the other hand, that same year Pablo de Hita Salazar, governor of Florida, described the Chisca as "our enemies, rebellious people, untamed and brought up licentiously". Diaz Vara Calderon, Bishop of Cuba, described the Chisca as living "without any fixed settlements, and sustaining themselves with the hunt, nuts, and roots of trees". Calderon gave the Chisca population as more than 4,000.

In 1674, Spanish missions were established in two Chacato towns. Diocsale, a chief of the Chacato, whose mother had been a Chisca, entertained Chiscas regularly at his house. Diocsale and other Chacatos resentful of Spanish missionary attempts to force them to confine themselves to one wife, and to otherwise conform with Christian morality, threatened to have the Chisca in the village at the mouth of the Apalachicola River cause trouble for other Chacatos and the missions. The lone missionary in the province was forced to flee for his life. The Spanish sent a few soldiers and 25 Apalachees armed with harquebuses to support the missionary, and to expel Chiscas who had been living in the Chacato towns. In 1676, the Chisca moved their village from near the eastern mouth of the Apalachicola River to the Choctawhatchee River. After the move, the Chisca began raiding missions in Apalachee and Timucua provinces.

Chiscas had apparently been raiding Spanish missions for several years before 1676, when the Spanish finally realized that they were responsible for some of the raids. In 1676, Chisca were believed to have raided several missions in Apalachee Province, including Ivitachuco, Patale, Bacuqua, Escambe, and Ayubale, killing Christian Apalachees, although some of the raids may have been committed by Yamasee. By the next year, a Chacato village had moved into Apalachee Province for better protection against raids by Chiscas. A Chacato casique named Miguel testified in a hearing in St. Augustine that the Chisca were responsible for the killings in Apalachee, and that they intended to continue attacking the Apalachee. Miguel was later accused by the Spanish of recruiting Chacatos and Pansacolas to join the Chiscas in their attacks on the mission Apalachee.

==== On the Choctawhatchee River ====
By 1677, the Chisca town on the mouth of the Apalachicola was abandoned, and the Spanish learned from a Chacato informant that the Chisca had built a palisaded town on the Choctawhatchee River, two days journey west of the Apalachicola River. The palisade was described as a bit more than 16 feet (4.9 m) high, and about 300 paces long on each side. It had boards near the top of the walls for fighters to stand on, and features that may have been glacis. The town was big enough to hold 700 fighting men and their dependents. The Spanish were told that the Chisca intended to use the town as a base for attacking the Apalachee, Timucua, Apalachicola, Chacato, Sabacola, Casista, Oconee, Usichi, Ayjichito and other peoples.

The Spanish and Apalachee mounted an expedition against the town on the Choctawhatchee in 1677. They suspected that the Chisca would be watching the trail that led directly from Chacato Province to the Choctawhatchee town, so the Spanish-Apalachee force moved south to a trail that ran closer to the coast. This led to a place where Chacatos and Pansacolas had settled near the coast. Those people had established a trail to the Chisca town, and then had all moved to the Chisca town. The Spanish and Apalachees used this trail to approach the Chisca town without opposition. While the Spanish and Apalachees had only 190 men, the 30 firearms carried by the Apalachees vastly outnumbered the two firearms that the Chisca were known to have. The Apalachees fired bar shot, which battered the wooden houses and other structures inside the palisade, and also started fires. Many women and children who had taken refuge in various structures were burned to death. The town was on a bluff overlooking a river, and many Chisca fled by swimming across the river.

Surviving Chiscas sought refuge in various places. Some went to Atassi (relatives of the Tukabatchee) on the Tallapoosa River and Tawasa on the Alabama River. Others apparently went to Tennessee. In 1683 the French explorer La Salle found what his expedition recorded as a "Cisca" village between the Cumberland and Tennessee rivers in northern Tennessee. La Salle reported that the Cisca had taken refuge in Tennessee after their village had been burned by a combined force of English and "Apalalchites". Mason thinks it is likely that La Salle misinterpreted what he was told, and that the people of the village were Chiscas who had fled the destruction of their village on the Choctawhatchee. La Salle persuaded those villagers and the Shawnee north of the Cumberland to relocate to Fort St. Louis in what is now western Illinois, to live under French protection. Around this time, these Chisca seem to have joined with the Shawnee under the name Chaskepe. They followed the Shawnee's later migrations (1692–1754) through Virginia, Maryland, Pennsylvania, and Ohio. La Salle reported that the Chisca had originally lived in the Appalachians east of where he found them, until their town was burnt down by colonists from Florida. (He mistakenly called those colonists English; they were Spanish).

Chisca have been documented in Apalachicola Province by 1662, but may have been there as early as they were in Spanish Florida.

=== 18th century ===
The Chisca were at war with the Apalachicola towns in the 1680s, but had formed an alliance with them by 1702. Two Chisca were reported to be among the attackers on the San Carlos de los Chacatos mission in 1689 (the others were from Sabacola, Coweta, Apalachicola, and Tiquepache). Chiscas participated with Apalachicolas in the attacks that pushed the Spanish out of Apalachee Province. Chisca were among the force (mainly Apalachicola and some Westo) of more than 400 fighters who ambushed and defeated an Apalachee force of 800 men in the Battle of Flint River in 1702. The Apalachee were seeking to avenge earlier attacks on several missions in Apalachee Province, but lost more than half of their force killed or captured.

Four Spaniards captured near Pensacola by Native groups, and released to St. Augustine in 1709, reported Chiscas among the various peoples supporting the English in their war against the Spanish. That group of Chiscas may have been living near the Choctaws.

A village called Uchi was among the Lower Towns of the Muscogee Confederacy on the Chattahoochee River (the site of the former Apalachicola Province) by 1715. John Swanton identified the people of that village as Chiscas (Yuchis).

Chisca were living in a mission near Pensacola in 1747. Chisca were also reported to be living 20 or 30 leagues east of Pensacola "on the road to Apalachee" in 1760.

== Affiliation and survival ==
John R. Swanton equated the Chisca with the Yuchi and the Westo. Later scholars have rejected the Westo identification, and some have questioned the identification of Yuchi with Chisca, arguing that Swanton based the connections on a misinterpretation of the route de Soto took through the Appalachian Mountains, and noting that while the different groups may have lived at the same places, they did not do so at the same time. DePratter, et al. locate Chisca in the 16th century on the upper Nolichucky River or Watauga River. Beck equates the town of Chisca during the same period with Maniatique on the Holston River. Swanton considered the people called "Chichimeco" by the Spanish to be the same as the Chisca, but Hann equates the Chichimeca with the Westo. The Chisca and the Westo may have spoken related languages, although not all authorities agree. The Uchi village on the Chattahoochee River in the 18th century may have included Chichimecos as well as Chiscas. Hann states the Yuchi/Uchee were clearly descended from the Chisca. Remnants of the Westos may have been absorbed into Chiscas/Yuchis.

Hann states that the use of the name "Chisca" by the Spanish for a specific group of people in Florida suggests that the Spanish believed they were the same as the people of the Chisca chiefdom encountered in the Appalachian Mountains by the Juan Pardo expeditions. Some authors, starting with John Swanton, have regarded Chiscas, Westos and Yuchis as the same people, although Goddard argues that Chiscas spoke a language distinct from that of the Westos, and that the three groups appeared in the southeastern United States at different times; the Chiscas in 1618, the Westo in 1661, and the Yuchis just before 1707. The Spanish referred to both Chiscas and Chichimecos early in the 17th century, and used Chisca interpreters to question Chichimeco captives in 1662. The people called Chichimecos (at least, later in the 17th century) by the Spanish were probably the people called Westos by the English.

The Chisca were also known as the Ysica or Yuchi to the Spanish. Hann believes that the names Chisca, Ysica, Yuchi, Uchi, and Uchee refer to the same people, and that they were possibly related to the Westo. Hann also states that the Spanish began calling Chisca "Yuchi" (Yujiha in their language, "Euchee" in English sources) in 1715. Those people were incorporated into the Muscogee nation and survive as a separate community in Oklahoma.

Wright notes a tradition that the Yuchi had been the people of the chiefdom of Chisca encountered by de Soto, and that in 1763 they retained memories of the Chisca chiefdom and continued to speak their own language, despite domination by Muscogee speakers. They kept separate from Muscogee speakers, living with Shawnees on the Tallapoosa River and Hitchiti speakers along the Chattahoochee River. Other Yuchis lived in separate villages on the Flint River, the Savannah River, and near Tampa Bay.

== Ballgames ==
The Chiscas played a ballgame that pitted men against women. There were goals at the north and south ends of the field. The goals were made of branches that formed an arch. Both sides could kick or roll the ball, but the women could also pick up the ball and run with it or pass it to other women. The games were part of a set of rituals culminating in the Green Corn Ceremony. The Chiscas also played a stickball game with a single goal, similar to games played by Muskogee people.

== See also ==
- List of sites and peoples visited by the Hernando de Soto Expedition
- Joara
- Mississippian culture
