= Amacano people =

Indigenous people of Florida

The Amacanos were a native American people who lived in the vicinity of Apalachee Province in Spanish Florida during the 17th century. They are believed to have been related to, and spoken the same language as, the Chacato, Chine, Pacara and Pensacola peoples. The Amacano were served, together with other peoples, by a series of Spanish missions during the last quarter of the 17th century.

== Origins ==
The origins of the Amacanos are obscure. John Swanton classified the Amacanos as Yamassee, apparently based only on the resemblance of their names. John Hann states that relationship is incorrect. The Amacano language is believed to be the same as, or closely related to, the Chacato language, as are the languages of other peoples that lived in the Florida Panhandle west of Apalachee Province in the 17th century, including the Chine, Pacara, and Pensacola people. All of those peoples were likely descended from people of the Fort Walton culture who lived along the Big Bend Coast of the Gulf of Mexico, in the Apalachicola River Valley, and in points west.

== Location ==
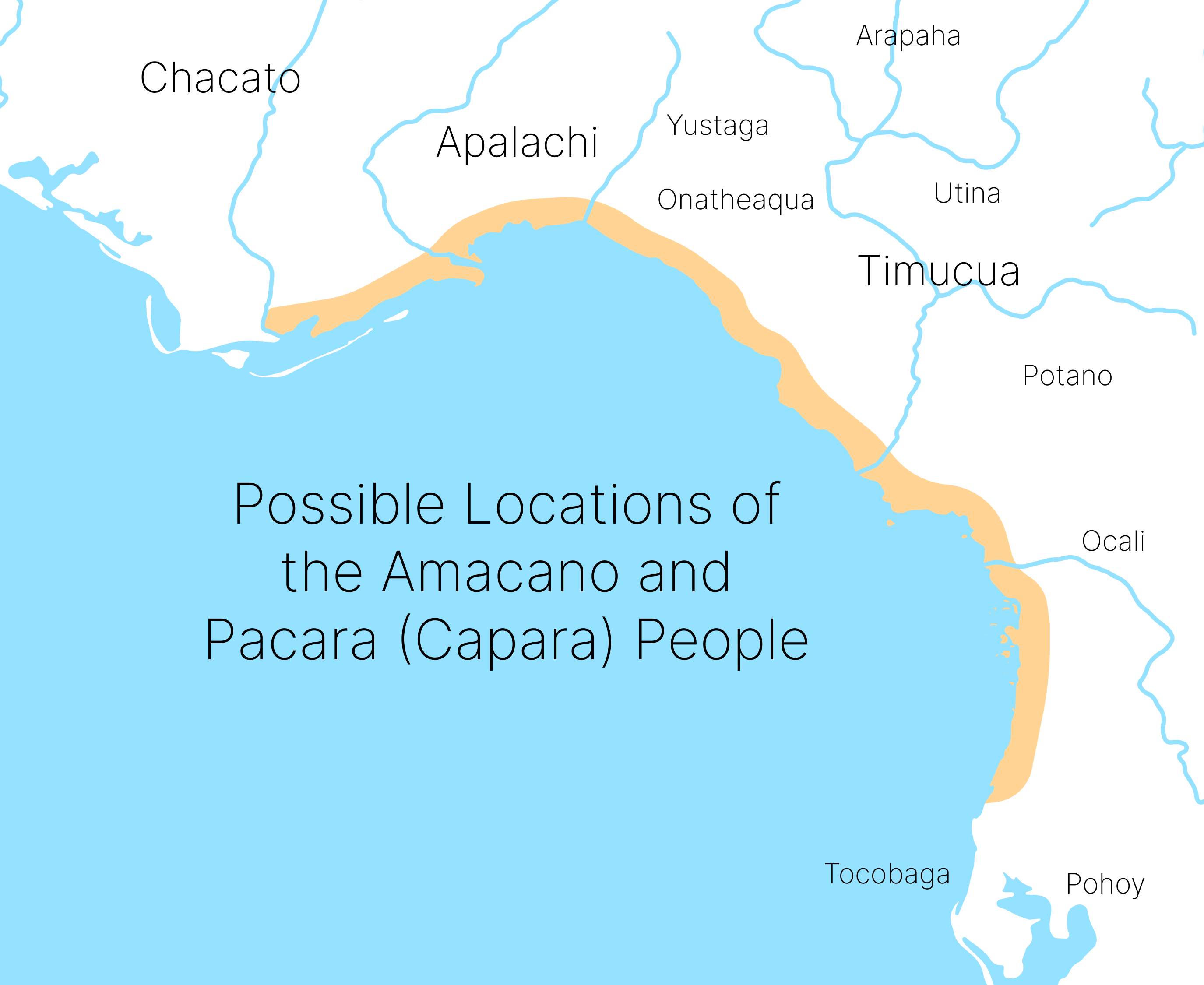
Possible locations of the Amacano people

Michael Gannon says the Amacanos lived west of Apalachee Province, as do John Hann and Bonnie McEwan (1998) and Joseph Hall. Jerald T. Milanich suggests that the Amacanos were from the lower Withlacoochee River in west central Florida north of Tampa Bay. Hann (2006) states that the Amacanos lived on the coast south and southeast of Apalachee in 1633. John Worth suggests that the Amacano lived along the Florida coast between the Aucilla river and Tampa Bay. (Note: This section of coast largely overlaps what is now known as the Big Bend Coast, extending from the Ocklockonee River to Anclote Key.) In 1628 or 1629, the Spanish in St. Augustine pressured the Pohoy of Tampa Bay to make peace with the Amacano, which suggests that the Amacano were living on the coast between the Pojoy on Tampa Bay, the Timucua in the Suwannee Valley, and Apalachee Province. The coast between Tampa Bay and Apalachee Province has been traditionally identified as inhabited by the Timucua; Milanich suggests that the boundaries of the Timucua reached Florida's west coast only at a few points.

The Amacano were said to be a small nation, and so likely occupied only a small territory, though they may have migrated or relocated in the 17th or 16th centuries.

== Early contacts ==
The Amacanos may have moved closer to Apalachee Province when Spanish missionaries first arrived to establish missions in 1633, although Hall thinks they were always close to the province. The Amacanos contacted the Spanish missionaries shortly after missions were first established in Apalachee Province. They requested a mission, but the Spanish missionaries were short-handed. The Amacanos built a church and convent (residence for a missionary) in anticipation of receiving a missionary. There is one report of a possible mission to the Amacanos in 1635, but no later mention in Spanish records of such a mission.

By 1637 the Amacano were reported to be living west of Apalachee Province, at the mouth of the Apalachicola river. That year, Amacano canoes met Spanish supply ships at the mouth of the Apalachicola River, and guided them towards Apalachee Province, but stopped before reaching Apalachee. In 1638, Damian de Vega Castro y Pardo, governor of Spanish Florida, sent Sergeant-Major Antonio de Herrerra López y Mesa to negotiate peace among the Apalachee, Apalachicola, Amacano and Chacato peoples.

The Amacano next appeared in Spanish records in 1674, when they were recorded living in association with Chine and Pacara people in the town of Chaccabi in the southern part of Apalachee Province near Apalachee Bay. (Note: Chaccabi was described as being on the road from San Luis, the capital of Apalachee Province, to the sea. The distance from San Luis was given as about ten or eleven leagues. John Hann argues that the uncertainty about the distance expressed in the Spanish account indicates that Chaccabi was not on the road to San Marcos, the main port for Apalachee Province. Hann also argues that Chaccabi was on the Rio Chachave that is on a 1683 Spanish map, on the western end of Apalachee Bay between the St. Marks River and the Ocklockonee River. Hann identifies Rio Chachave with Spring Creek (30.08°N 84.33°W).) The three people were described as allies, speaking the same language, but as separate "nations". The Chine were probably the most numerous of the three peoples in Chaccabi.

== Missions ==
A mission dedicated to St. Peter the Apostle (San Pedro) was founded in Chaccabi in April, 1674, to serve the Amacano, Chine, and Pacara people of the town, who were gradually being converted to Christianity. The three peoples of Chaccabi had apparently moved to a new site known as "the place of the Chines" by the next year, when Gabriel Díaz Vara Calderón, bishop of Santiago de Cuba, founded the mission of Assumpcíon del Puerto on February 2, 1675, to serve them. (Note: Hann places the new mission of Assumpcíon del Puerto at just six leagues from San Luis, on the road to the coast. A map in Gannon shows the mission in the northwest part of Apalachee Province.) That mission does not appear in Spanish records after 1675. The mission, identified as "Assumpcíon de Nuestra Señora", was reported to have 300 residents in 1675, which may be an undercount.

The Chines, along with the Amacanos and Pacaras, may have moved more than once after 1675. A mission of "San Pedro de los Chines" is on a mission list from 1680. A mission named "San Antonio de Chines" was listed in 1694, which Hann says may be the result of a move to a location closer to San Luis. A census in 1681 counted 158 adults. A list in 1689 gave the population as 30 families.

== Sources ==
- Gannon, Michael V. (1965). The Cross in the Sand. University Presses of Florida. ISBN 0-8130-0776-3.
- Geiger, Maynard (1940). "Biographical Dictionary of the Franciscans in Spanish Florida and Cuba (1528-1841)". Franciscan Studies. 21 (21): V–IX, XI–XII, 1–117, 119–140. JSTOR 43900081.
- Hall, Joseph (2000). "Confederacy Formation on the Fringes of Spanish Florida" (PDF). Mediterranean Studies. 9: 123–141. ISSN 1074-164X. JSTOR 41166915.
- Hann, John H. (April 1990). "Summary Guide to Spanish Florida Missions and Visitas with Churches in the Sixteenth and Seventeenth Centuries". The Americas. 46 (4): 417–513. doi:10.2307/1006866. JSTOR 1006866. S2CID 147329347.
- Hann, John H. (2006). The Native American World Beyond Apalachee. University Press of Florida. ISBN 9-780-8130-2982-5.
- Hann, John H.; McEwan, Bonnie G. (1998). The Apalachee Indians and Mission San Luis. University Press of Florida. ISBN 0-8130-1564-2.
- Milanich, Jerald T. (1995). Florida Indians and the Invasion from Europe (paperback ed.). University Press of Florida. ISBN 978-0-8130-1636-8.
- Milanich, Jerald T. (1996). Timucua. VNR AG. ISBN 978-1-55786-488-8.
- Milanich, Jerald T. (1999). Laboring in the Fields of the Lord. Smithsonian Institution Press. p. 166. ISBN 1-56098-940-8.
- Worth, John E. (1998). The Timucuan Chiefdoms of Spanish Florida: Volume II: Resistance and Destruction. University Press of Florida. doi:10.2307/j.ctv18x4j2b. ISBN 978-0-8130-1575-0. JSTOR j.ctv18x4j2b.
