= Apalachicola people =

Apalachicola people may refer to:

- Apalachicola band, an association of towns on the Apalachicola River in Florida in the early 19th century
- Apalachicola Province, an association of towns on the Chattahoochee River in Alabama and Georgia (USA) that became the Lower Towns of the Muscogee Confederacy
- Apalachicola (tribal town), the namesake town of the Apalachicola Province
