= Apalachicola (tribal town) =

Native American town in Southeast USA

Apalachicola (Hitchiti: Apalahchi ókli, meaning 'those [people] on the other side, shore or river') was a tribal town in the Apalachicola Province in the 17th century, located on the lower part of the Chattahoochee River in what is now Alabama and Georgia. The residents of the town spoke the Hitchiti language. The town of Apalachicola moved to the Savannah River in the early 1690s, when the other towns in Apalachicola Province moved to central Georgia, primarily to sites along the Ocmulgee River. In 1715, Apalachicola moved back to the Chattahoochee River along with the towns that had been on the Ocmulgee River, with the English then calling them "Lower Creeks" (Note: After most of the tribal towns that had previously been located along the Chattahoochee River moved to Ochese Creek (later renamed Ocmulgee River) in central Georgia, the English started calling them "Ochese Creek Indians". The English continued calling the people of those towns "Creek Indians" after the towns moved back to the Chattahoochee River. The tribal towns along the Chattahoochee River became known as the "Lower Creeks", while tribal towns in Alabama and Tennessee that were also members of the Muscogee Confederacy became known as the "Upper Creeks". While tribal towns whose people spoke the Muscogee language dominated the Muscogee confederacy, many member towns spoke other languages, including Hitchiti, Alabama, Koasati, Yuchi, and others. The use of the term "Creek Indians", which includes Muscogees and other peoples, is often offensive to the descendants of those people.) ("Lower Towns of the Muscogee Confederacy"), while the Spanish called them "Ochese". The town of Apalachicola continued as part of the Lower Towns through the 18th century.

== Spanish contacts ==
In the first half of the 17th century, Apalachicola was one of the towns situated along of the Chattahoochee River in Alabama and Georgia, from the south of the falls at present-day Columbus to Barbour County, Alabama. The Spanish contacted the towns on the Chattahoochee River in 1638, five years after Spanish missions were first established in Apalachee Province. The Spanish originally perceived political power to be concentrated in the southern part of the province, and recognized Apalachicola as the most important town in the province. The Spanish therefore called the association of towns on the Chattahoochee River "Apalachicola Province". (Note: Hudson et al. argue that the Spanish used provincia to designate political units rather than linguistic or ethnic groups.) People in Apalachicola Province began asking for friars to be sent to them in the 1640s, and regular trade between the Spanish in Apalachee Province and Apalachicola Province began in the 1650s.

The Spanish heard of outside people moving into Apalachicola Province in the 1670s, including the Muscogee-speaking town of Coweta. Later the same year the bishop of Cuba produced a list of potential targets for missions, which included Coweta ("Cueta" to the Spanish) in the northern part of Apalachee Province. While Coweta later claimed to be the most ancient and powerful town on the Chattahoochee River, it had only moved there in the 1660s or 1670s, into the northern end of a province consisting of at least eight Hitchiti-speaking towns. (Note: A Spanish report in 1686 described the Muscogee- and Koasati-speaking towns of Cueta (Coweta), Casista (Kasihta), Colone (Kolomi), and Tasquique (Tuskeegee) as being "from other places".)

Apalachicola Province had at least eight Hitchiti-speaking towns in the 1670s. The Spanish still regarded Apalachicola as the leading town of the province, but power in Apalachicola Province was shifting to Coweta, as evidenced by the chief of Coweta forcing Apalachicola to expel Spanish missionaries in 1679. While the Spanish recognized Coweta's rising influence, they had not yet recognized the chief of Coweta as the "grand cacique" of the province, and he was probably not yet called "emperor".

== Missionaries and soldiers ==
The people of Apalachicola Province had requested the Spanish to send missionaries to their towns, but the lack of available missionaries had caused those requests to be ignored. The visit of the English trader Henry Woodward to Coweta in the late 1670s alarmed the Spanish. Possibly in response to the English encroachment, the Spanish began courting the Apalachicolas, inviting them to move their towns closer to Apalachee Province so that missions could be established in them. At least part of the town of Sabacola moved in 1674 to a spot just south of the junction of the Chattahoochee and Flint rivers, where they established a new town that the Spanish called "Sabacola el Menor", and which became the site of the mission of La Encarnation a la Santa Cruz. Fearing attacks from the Chisca in western Florida, who were at war with the Apalachee, the residents of Sabacola el Menor moved north up the Chattahoochee River some time around 1677.

In 1679, Florida governor Pablo de Hita y Salazar ordered missionaries to convert the "pagans" of Apalachicola Province. Three days after the missionaries were welcomed in Apalachicola, men from Coweta and other towns arrived in Apalachicola and convinced the chief of Apalachicola to expel the missionaries, apparently by threatening to have Westos attack the missionaries. Coweta temporarily dominated Apalachicola in this event, but the Spanish had not yet recognized the chief of Coweta as a "grand cacique".

Missionaries accompanied by soldiers returned to Apalachicola in 1681. The killing of Christian Apalachees by Apalachicolas led to more soldiers being sent to Apalachicola, which in turn led to another expulsion from the province. Governor Juan Márquez Cabrera offered to pardon the murderers if the Apalachicola Province chiefs went to St. Augustine to "render obeisance" to the king. The chiefs of Apalachicola and four other towns did so. Those four towns were under the leadership of Apalachicola, but the chief of Apalachicola claimed to have little control over the residents of those towns. The five chiefs indicated that the chief of Coweta was in charge of the whole province. Hahn notes that this is the first time Coweta was stated to be over the province, indicating such status was recent. Governor Cabrera was convinced by the claims, and invited the chief of Coweta to St. Augustine. The chief reached St. Augustine at the beginning of 1682. He claimed a position over all of Apalachicola Province, with nine, or later the same day, eleven towns under him. The chiefs of Apalachicola and Coweta traveled to St. Augustine in 1684 and 1685 to renew ties with the Spanish. In 1685, Antonio Matheos was sent to Apalachicola Province by the governor of Spanish Florida to confront the English traders from Caroline that were staying in the northern part of Apalachicola Province. The chiefs and people of most of the towns fled. "Old Pentocolo", chief of the town of Apalachicola, was the only chief who did not flee.

In the 1680s, the town of Apalachicola was probably located in what is now Russell County, Alabama, on the west side of the Chattahoochee River, but the precise location of the town has not been idenfified.

== Savannah River ==
Between 1690 and 1692, all of the towns in Apalachicola Province moved east into what is now the state of Georgia. Most of those towns moved to what the English called Ochese Creek, and is now known as the Ocmulgee River. The town of Apalachicola moved to the north side of the Savannah River, at a location about 20 miles from the Atlantic coast, where a trade route crossed the river. The English called the town "Palachacola".

A colonial census taken in 1708 described the Apalachicola of the Savannah River as the "Naleathuckles", with 80 men settled in a town about 20 miles up the Savannah River. A more accurate census was taken by colonist John Barnwell in early 1715. It described the Savannah River Apalachicola as living in two villages and having a population of 214 people: 64 men, 71 women, 42 boys, and 37 girls. As did most of the native towns trading with the Province of Carolina, the Apalachicola sold captives to Carolinian slave traders.

An archaeological site in the James W. Webb Wildlife Center and Game Management Area in southwest Hampton County, South Carolina, at Stokes Landing, is believed to be the site of Palachacola. The site was strategically important enough that the Carolinians built a fort there after the town of Palachacola (Apalachicola) had moved back to the Chattahoochee River.

== Return to the Chattahoochee ==
Palachacola participated in the Yamassee War against South Caroliona in 1715. The Carolinians defearted the Native American attackers, and the "Ochese Creeks", that is, the towns (including Oconee and Apalachicola) which had moved from the Chattahoochee River 25 years earlier, returned to the Chattahoochee. The town of Apalachicola re-settled at, or near, the site it had occupied prior to 1690. Diego Pena was sent by the governor of Spanish Florida in 1716 to improve relations with the towns on the Chattahoochee River. He reported that the town of Apalachicola was located six leagues from Coweta (possibly at archaeological site 1Ru65) and had 173 men, more than any of the other nine towns he listed on the Chattahoochee River. Peña met with the leaders of the Chattahoochee River towns in an assembly in Apalachicola. Six towns in the province, Tasquigue, Apalachicola, Ocone, Hitchiti, Yuchi, and Sabacola, promised Peña that they would move to Apalachee province. In 1717, the Spanish referred to the towns on the Chattahoochee River as the "province of Cauetta (Coweta) or Apalachicola".

A possible satellite or daughter town of Apalachicola, under a chief named Chislacaliche or Cherokeeleechee ("Cherokee killer"), settled just above the forks of the Apalachicola River in 1716. The town was also known as Chislacaliche or Cherokeelechee and, later, as the Apalachicola Fort. Men from the town of Apalachicola continued to raid into South Carolina, including Port Royal, for many years after 1715. They kept some captives from South Carolina, including two young girls who were ransomed to the Spanish, who in turn kept and raised them. Quilate, head warrior of the town of Apalachicola, was part of a delegation of "Creeks" that met with Governor James Oglethorpe of Georgia in Savannah in 1733. Quilate was also among the "Creeks" who pledged friendship with the Spanish in a meeting with the commander of the Spanish garrison at Fort San Marcos in 1734.

== Later 18th century ==
A map produced by William Bolan in 1756 placed Palacochola (Apalachicola) immediately south of Auheege Creek (called Hitchiti Creek at its juncture with the Chattahoochee River). Apalachicola was visited in 1772 by David Taitt, and in the late 1770s by William Bartram. Both visitors related that the town had moved in 1755 to its then location from a site about 1.5 miles (2.4 km) downriver. Taitt described the old site of Apalachicola as being on a point, while Bartram said it was "on a peninsula formed by a doubling of the river," with a mound adjacent to the site. Foster argues that Old Apalachicola was likely at archaeological site 1RU65, with sites 1RU27 and 1RU66 (the Patterson site) as less likely possibilities. Foster notes that Apalachicola was likely located at site 1RU16 in the 1770s and in 1796, when Benjamin Hawkins visited it. Hawkins found Apalachicola on the west bank of the Chattahoochee River 1.5 miles (2.4 km) below Auhegee Creek, and about 15 minutes below the town of Hitchiti.

Pauchee Haujo of the town of Apalachicola signed the Treaty of Fort Jackson in 1814.

== Legacy ==
The Apalachicola River is named after the province. The Spanish included what is now called the Chattahoochee River as part of one river, calling all of it from its origins in the southern Appalachian foothills down to the Gulf of Mexico the Apalachicola. Apalachicola Bay and the city of Apalachicola, Florida are named after the river.

== Sources ==
- Bolton, Herbert Eugene (1964). Bannon, John Francis (ed.). Bolton and the Spanish Borderlands. University of Oklahoma Press. p. 138. ISBN 0-8061-0612-3.
- Braley, Chad O. (December 1995), "Historic Indian Archaeology of the Georgia Coastal Plain" (PDF), Georgia Archaeological Research Design Paper, no. 10, pp. 36, 44
- Foster, H. Thomas II (2007). Archaeology of the Lower Muskogee Creek Indians, 1715-1836. The University of Alabama Press. ISBN 978-0-8173-1239-8.
- Foster, H. Thomas II (2022). Apalachicola: Resilience and Adaptation of a Native American Community on the Chattahoochee River. Routledge. ISBN 978-1-032-20125-2.
- Gallay, Alan (2002). The Indian Slave Trade: The Rise of the English Empire in the American South 1670–1717. Yale University Press. pp. 201, 206. ISBN 0-300-10193-7 – via Internet Archive.
- Hahn, Steven C. (2004). The Invention of the Creek Nation, 1670–1763. University of Nebraska Press. ISBN 0-8032-2414-1.
- Hann, John H. (April 1990). "Summary Guide to Spanish Florida Missions and Visitas. With Churches in the Sixteenth and Seventeenth Centuries". The Americas. 46 (4): 417–513. doi:10.2307/1006866. JSTOR 1006866.
- Hann, John H. (2006). The Native American World Beyond Apalachee. University Press of Florida. ISBN 978-0-8130-2982-5.
- Hudson, Charles; Beck, Robin A. Jr.; DePratter, Chester B.; Ethridge, Robbie; Worth, John E. (Summer 2008). "On Interpreting Cofitacheque". Ethnohistory. 53 (3): 465–490. doi:10.1215/00141801-2008-005 – via academia.edu.
- Ivers, Larry E. (2016). This Torrent of Indians: War on the Southern Frontier 1715-1728 (Ebook ed.). University of South Carolina Press. ISBN 978-1-61117-607-0.
- Simpson, J. Clarence (1956). Boyd, Mark F. (ed.). Florida Place-Names of Indian Derivation. Special Publication No. 1. Tallahassee, Florida: Florida Geological Survey.
- Worth, John E. (2000). "The Lower Creeks: Origin and History" (PDF). In McEwan (ed.). Indians of the Greater Southeast: Historical Archaeology and Ethnohistory (Bonnie G. ed.). University of Florida Press. pp. 265–298. ISBN 9-780-8130-2086-0.
- Kappler, Charles J., ed. (1904). "Indian Affairs: Laws and Treaties, Volume II: Treaties - Treaty with the Creeks, 1814". Archived from the original (PDF) on April 25, 2007.
