= Tawasa language =

Extinct Native American language

Tawasa
- Teouachi
- Native to: United States
- Region: eastern Alabama
- Ethnicity: Tawasa people
- Extinct: 18th century
- Language family: Timucua: Tawasa

Language codes
- ISO 639-3: None (mis)
- Glottolog: tawa1290
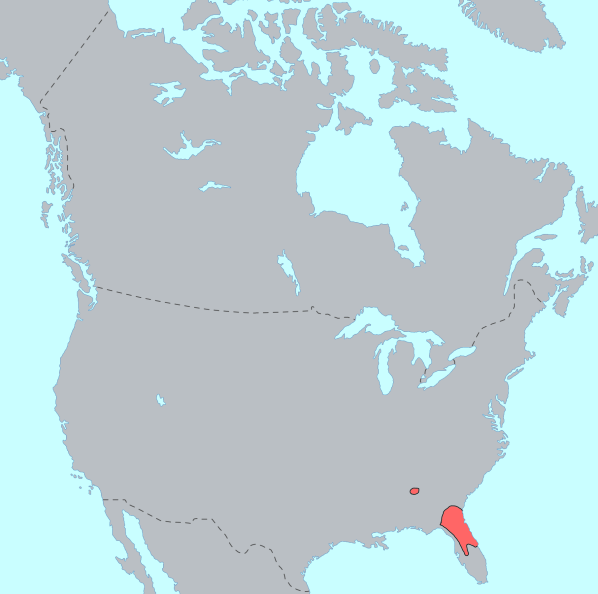
- Pre-contact distribution of the Timucua language (Florida) and Tawasa

Tawasa is an extinct Native American language, considered to be related to Timucua and possibly a dialect of it. Ostensibly the language of the Tawasa people of what is now Alabama, it is known exclusively through a word list attributed to a Tawasa man named Lamhatty, collected in 1707.

John Swanton studied the Lamhatty word list and identified the language as a Timucua dialect, suggesting it was intermediary between Timucua and Muskogean. This opinion has been the subject of significant scholarly debate, with some such as Julian Granberry considering it a dialect of Timucua, others arguing it was a distinct language in the Timucua family, and yet others such as John Hann doubting that Lamhatty was a Tawasa at all. The language shows significant Alabama influence, including the Muskogean same-subject suffix -t.

== Evidence ==
In 1707 an Indian named Lamhatty arrived in the British colony of Virginia, eventually arriving at the estate of Colonel John Walker. Taking an interest in him, Walker introduced him to colonial historian Robert Beverley. Through an interpreter, Lamhatty explained that he was from the village of Tawasa near the Gulf of Mexico. He had been captured and enslaved by the Tuscarora, who had transported him eastward and had sold him to the Savannah people. He had escaped and had traveled north to Virginia. Walker recorded the 60-word lexicon he had learned from Lamhatty on the back of a letter, while Beverley wrote an account of Lamhatty's story. According to Beverley, Walker began treating Lamhatty like a slave once he learned other Tawasa were enslaved. Lamhatty escaped and went into the woods, never to be heard from again.

There has been scholarly debate about the place of Tawasa among languages. Studying the word list in the early 20th century, John Swanton noted the similarity with the Timucua language, and suggested Tawasa was an intermediary with Muskogean. Linguist Julian Granberry identifies it as a dialect of Timucua. Others, such as John Hann, are skeptical of the accuracy of Beverley's account. He questions whether Lamhatty was a Tawasa at all.

== Vocabulary ==
Tawasa words are a bit difficult to make out, due to English respellings. For example, oo, ou corresponds to Timucua u, ough to o, eu to yu, and often e, ee to Timucua i. Tawasa w corresponds to Timucua b, which was probably pronounced [β]. Timucua c, q were [k]; qu was [kʷ]. Some of the following correspondences have a final t in Tawasa, which appears to be a Muskogean suffix. Others appear to have the Timucua copula -la. Timucua forms are from the Mocama dialect.

Tawasa	Timucua	gloss
effalàh	efa-la	dog
písso	pesolo	bread
soúa	soba	meat
pítcho-t	picho	knife
ocoò-t	ucu	drink
heă-t	hiyaraba	cat
yáukfah	yanqua	1
eúksah	yucha	2
hóp-ho	hapu	3
checúttah	cheqeta	4
márouah	marua	5
mareékah	mareca	6
pekétchah	piqicha	7
pekénnahough	piqinaho	8
peétchcuttah	peqecheqeta	9
toómah	tuma	10
tomo-eúcha	tuma-yucha	20
foóley	hue-le	hand
hewéenou	hinino	tobacco
ocut-soúa	ucuchua	door
oū	ho	I
hé	he	you
uēkqūah	ca	here
uēkheth	heqe	there
hĕmèh	hime	come
héwah	hiba	sit down
loókqŭy	(a)ruqui	boy
néăh	nia	woman
wiedōō	biro	man
colúte	colo	bow
wiéo-tt	ibi	water
wiéo-tt opù-t	ibi-api	salt water
yōwe	yayu	great
chicky, chiéky	chiri, qichi	little
sōquàh	chuca	how many

Correspondences with Muskogean and Timucua are,

Tawasa	Muskogean	Timucua	gloss
chesapà	Alabama: časi	tapola	maize
hássey	Alabama: haši	ela	sun
ássick	Alabama: nila haši	acu	moon
chénah, chénoh	Natchez: ičina	oqe	he
tútcah	Creek: tó'tka	taca	fire

Although ássick 'moon' appears to be an Alabama form, its compounds are Timucuan:

Tawasa	Timucua	gloss	notes
ássick hóomah	acu homa	full moon	homa 'finish'
ássick-toúquah	ela-toco	east	ela-toco 'sun-come out' = 'sunrise'
ássick-eachah	ela-echa	west	ela-echa 'sun-enter = 'sunset'
