= Apalachicola Province =

Association of Native American tribal towns

Apalachicola
Elecvlke (Creek)

Total population
- Merged into Muscogee (Creek) tribes

Languages
- Hitchiti, Muscogee, and others

Related ethnic groups
- other Muskogean-speaking peoples

Apalachicola Province was a group or association of towns located along the lower part of the Chattahoochee River in present-day Alabama and Georgia. The Spanish so called it because they perceived it as a political entity under the leadership of the town of Apalacicola. It is believed that before the 17th century, the residents of all the Apalachicola towns spoke the Hitchiti language, although other towns whose people spoke the Muscogee language relocated among the Apalachicolas along the Chattahoochee River in the middle- to later- 17th century. All of the Apalachicola towns moved to central Georgia at the end of the 17th century, where the English called them "Ochese Creek Indians". They moved back to the Chattahoochee River after 1715, with the English then calling them "Lower Creeks" (Creek: Elecvlke; "Lower Towns of the Muscogee Confederacy"), while the Spanish called them "Ochese".

== Origins ==
In the first half of the 17th century, a number of towns were situated along 160 kilometres (100 mi) of the Chattahoochee River in Alabama and Georgia, from the south of the falls at present-day Columbus to Barbour County, Alabama. (Note: The southernmost town, Sabacola, was probably located at the Blackmon site (1BR25) or the nearby 1BR30 site, in Barbour County, Alabama in the 1670s.) Archaeological evidence indicates that the material culture of the 17th century lower Chattahoochee region had developed in place over several centuries. The ancestors of at least some of the people in the area may have been there as early as 12,000 years ago. In the Middle and Late Woodland Period (300–750) sites such as Kolomoki were important centers of the regional culture. A variant of the Lamar regional culture, with influences from the Fort Walton culture to the south, developed in the towns along the Chattahoochee between 1300 and 1400. The cultural continuity of archaeological sites into historical times suggests that the towns along the Chattahoochee River spoke the Hichiti language in the late prehistoric period.

A chiefdom of the South Appalachian Mississippian culture had existed in the lower Chattahoochee River valley in the 16th century. A major change in ceramic types at sites along the Chattahoochee River occurred between 1550 and 1650. There is also evidence of a large drop in the population in the area. The de Soto expedition in the 1540s did not enter the Chattahoochee Valley, but appears to have severely disrupted the population of that chiefdom, causing many deaths there due to epidemics of European and African diseases introduced by the Spaniards. Some archaeologists state that only two population centers survived along the Chattahoochee in the late 16th century, situated on opposite sides of the river south of the falls at Columbus. Both sites had large platform mounds, and may have served as ceremonial centers. While some archaeologists believe that some sites along the Chattahoochee remained stable population centers, and became sites of later population expansion, other archaeologists believe that there were significant influxes of other people into the Chattahoochee Valley, changing the material culture of the area, and that similar processes occurred in the Tallahassee Hills region of Florida (the historic Apalachee Province). At least some of the people of the Chattahoochee River towns may have migrated south towards Apalachee, while Muscogee people from the Coosa and Tallapoosa areas in Alabama may have moved into the Chattahoochee valley. Folklore of the Lower Towns of the Muscogee Confederacy supports an interpretation of Muscogee-speaking immigrants joining a Hitchiti-speaking resident population, with the Chattahoochee River area including both Hitchiti- and Muscogee-speaking towns by the later 17th century. Speakers of the Koasati language, Apalachee people, and people known as Chisca or Yuchi also settled in the Chattahoochee towns in the later 17th century.

The collapse of the Mississippian culture that followed the disruption caused by the de Soto Expedition was incomplete. Both Foster and Hahn comment that Apalachicola Province had "the form, but not the substance, of a multi-community 'chiefdom'." Individual towns in Apalachicola Province were independent to a great extent. Bolton refers to the towns in Apalachicola Province in 1679 as the "Apalachicola Confederacy".

== Spanish contacts ==
The Spanish contacted the towns on the Chattahoochee River in 1638, five years after Spanish missions were first established in Apalachee Province. The Spanish called the association of towns on the Chattahoochee River "Apalachicola Province", (Note: Hudson et al. argue that the Spanish used provincia to designate political units rather than linguistic or ethnic groups.) after what they perceived as the most powerful town in the province, Apalachicola. Apalachicolas began asking for friars to be sent to them in the 1640s, and regular trade between the Spanish in Apalachee Province and the Apalachicola began in the 1650s. By the 1670s, deer skins from the Apalachicola were being shipped to Havana.

The Spanish heard of outside people moving into Apalachicola Province in the 1670s. At the same time the English adventurer Henry Woodward, who had reached the upper reaches of the Savannah River, heard reports of the "Cowatoe", the first mention of Coweta in European sources. Later the same year the bishop of Cuba produced a list of potential targets for missions, which included Coweta ("Cueta" to the Spanish) in the northern part of Apalachee Province. While Coweta later claimed to be the most ancient and powerful town on the Chattahoochee, it had only moved there in the 1660s or 1670s, into the northern end of a province consisting of at least eight Hitchiti-speaking towns. (Note: A Spanish report in 1686 described the Muscogee- and Koasati-speaking towns of Cueta (Coweta), Casista (Kasihta), Colone (Kolomi), and Tasquique (Tuskegee) as being "from other places".) The Spanish originally perceived political power to be concentrated in the southern part of the province. The Spanish recognized Apalachicola as the most important town in the province, while Sabacola, at the southern end of the province, also exercised great influence, being closest to the Spanish in Apalachee Province. The chief of Sabacola may have converted to Christianity, and was recognized by the Spanish at one point as the "grand cacique" of Apalachicola Province.

The number and names of towns on the Chattahoochee River varied in different Spanish reports. Two lists, from 1675 and 1685–1686, show many similarities, and a few differences. The towns listed by the Spanish, from south to north, were:

Towns on the Chattahoochee River in the 17th century
1675 list	1685–1686 list	Common English name	Primary language of town
Chicahûti			possibly Hitchiti
Sabacôla	Sauocola chicasa	Sawokli or Sauwoogelo	possibly Hitchiti (Note: While some sources indicate that Hitchiti was the language of Sabacola, one Spanish report stated that the people of Sabacola spoke a language that was neither Apalachee nor Hitchiti.)
Oconi	Ocóni	Oconee	Hitchiti
Apalachôcoli	Apalachicoli	Apalachicola or Palachicola	Hitchiti
Ylapi	Alapi		possibly Hitchiti or Yamassee
Tacûsi	Tacussa		possibly Hitchiti
Vsachi	Osuchi		possibly Hitchiti
Okmûlgui	Ocmulque	Okmulgee	Hitchiti
Ahachito	Achito	Echete or Hitchiti	Hitchiti
Cazitho	Casista	Kasihta, Cussita or Cusseta	Muscogee
Colômme	Colone	Kolomi	Muscogee
Cabita	Cueta	Coweta	Muscogee
Cuchiguâli			possibly Muscogee
	Tasquique	Tuskegee	possibly Koasati or Yamassee
	Ocuti		probably Yamassee

Three towns that were on or close to the route of de Soto's expedition in 1540 may have later moved to the Chattahoochee River. Alapi may have derived from a town located east of Cofitachequi, the town of Ocuti may have been a successor to the Ocute chiefdom of the Oconee River valley, and Casista (Kasihta) was on the Coosa River at the time of de Soto's visit.

== Missionaries and soldiers ==
The Apalachicolas had requested the Spanish to send missionaries to their towns, but the lack of available missionaries had caused those requests to be ignored. The visit of Henry Woodward to Coweta in the late 1670s alarmed the Spanish. Possibly in response to the English encroachment, the Spanish began courting the Apalachicolas, inviting them to move their towns closer to Apalachee Province so that missions could be established in them. At least part of the town of Sabacola moved in 1674 to a spot just south of the junction of the Chattahoochee and Flint rivers, where they established a new town of Sabacola el Menor, which became the site of the mission of La Encarnation a la Santa Cruz. Fearing attacks from the Chisca in western Florida, who were at war with the Apalachee, the residents of Sabacola el Menor moved north up the Chattahoochee River some time around 1677.

Sabacola el Grande was located on the Chattahoochee River a few leagues south of the falls at Columbus. Some residents of Sabacola had become Christians when the town was located in Florida, and requested that missionaries be sent to them. In late 1679, three missionaries, including the friar at the former mission in Sabacola el Menor, were sent to Apalachicola Province to convert the Apalachicolas as a counter to the growing English influence in the Chattahoochee valley. The Muscogee and Koasati-speaking towns were in communication with Westos, who were allied with the English in the Province of Carolina. The Christians of Sabacola had not informed the chief of Coweta of their request for Spanish missionaries. On hearing of the arrival of the missionaries, the chief traveled to Sabacola with men from Coweta and other towns who were friendly with the Westos, and forced the missionaries to leave three days later. In 1680, the Carolinians turned on the Westos, who had been their allies and slave-raiders, killing most of them. The surviving Westos sought refuge at Coweta. Now wary of the English, the chief of Coweta renewed contact with the Spanish. In the fall of 1680 the chief of Sabacola went to St. Augustine and invited the Spanish to send missionaries and soldiers to Apalachicola. Juan Márquez Cabrera, who had become governor of Spanish Florida in 1680, sent missionaries back to Sabacola in 1681, with an escort of seven (or twelve) Spanish soldiers. At about the same time, some Apalachicolas killed a couple of Christian Apalachees in Apalachee Province. The Spanish sent more soldiers to Apalachicola, and relations worsened. The missionaries baptized 36 residents of Sabacola before being forced out again a few months later. Cabrera suspected English influence in the hostility shown the missionaries. Threats from Cabrera led to at least the Christianized residents of Sabacola moving south to a point west of the Flint River just above where it joins the Chattahoochee. A mission named San Carlos de Sabacola was established in the town before 1686. The mission last appears in Spanish records in 1690. The mission town may have included Chatots from the earlier mission of San Carlos de los Chacatos in present-day Jackson County, Florida.

In the 1680s, the Spanish were using Uchise to refer to people living around Ochese Creek (now the Ocmulgee river) in central Georgia. In 1691, after the Apalachicola towns had mostly moved to the Ochese Creek area, the Spanish identified the people that had begun attacking missions that year as "Indians of Uchise, Yamasses, and Englishmen", where Uchise meant Apalachicola. Hann takes this transfer of identity as an indication that the people who lived in the vicinity of Ochese Creek in the 1680s were related to the Hitchiti-speakers of the Apalachicola Province, and may have become part of the province by 1680. There were also Yamasee from Tama Province (Note: Tama Province was the name the Spanish gave to the area in eastern Georgia west of Guale Province.) living in Apalachicola province in the 1680s. Many Apalachees disaffected with the Spanish presence in Apalachee Province moved to the Apalachicola towns in the 1680s. Qua, an Apalachee woman from a prominent family at Mission San Luis (in Anhaica, the principal town of Apalachee Province), married Emperor Brim of Coweta. One of Brim's sons also had an Apalachee wife.

== English contacts ==
In 1682, Henry Woodward and others from the Carolina colony began trading with the people of what is now western South Carolina and Georgia, reaching the Chattahoochee River in 1685. The Spanish reacted immediately. Juan Márquez Cabrera, governor of Florida, sent soldiers from St. Augustine to Apalachee Province. Antonio Matheos, deputy governor in Apalache Province, set out in September for the Apalachicola Province before the reinforcements arrived, hoping to capture the English traders. The English and many of the Apalachicolas fled. Matheos destroyed a half-built English stockade north of the falls of the Chattahoochee, and returned to Apalachee. The Carolinians quickly returned to the Apalachicola towns, and in December Matheos returned up the river, under orders from Governor Cabrera to burn the towns if they did not surrender the English traders to him. The traders and many of the Apalachicolas again fled. Matheos summoned the chiefs of the towns to meet him at Coweta. Eight chiefs attended the meeting, and were pardoned. The chiefs of Coweta, Kasihta, Tuskegee, and Koloni refused, and their towns were burned. Matheos then returned to Apalachee. Tuskegee and Koloni quickly rebuilt after their towns had been burned, and behaved in a friendly manner towards the Spanish. Coweta and Kasihta did not initially return to the former sites of their towns, and became openly hostile towards the Spanish, ceasing trade with them.

The English traders soon returned to the Chattahoochee. The Spanish sent three more expeditions to capture the English in the following three years, without success. In 1689 the Spanish built a stockade near the town of Coweta, and left 20 Spanish soldiers and 20 Apalachees to hold it. In 1690 the towns of Cueta (Coweta) and Casista (Cusseta) moved to the interior of Georgia, closer to their trading partners in Carolina. Pirates threatened St. Augustine in 1690, and the garrison in the stockade on the Chattahoochee was withdrawn to St. Augustine, destroying the stockade as they left. Other towns along the Chattahoochee left later for central Georgia, as well. Spanish records state that Apalachicola Province was completely abandoned by the spring of 1692.

== Ochese Creek ==
Most of the towns from the Chattahoochee River that moved to central Georgia settled in the area of what the English called Ochese Creek (Uchise to the Spanish), which is now known as the Ocmulgee River, a tributary of the Altamaha River. The town of Apalachicola was established on the lower Savannah River (the English called the town Palachacola), and the town of Oconee was established on another branch of the Altamaha, now called the Oconee River. English reports placed eleven (unnamed) towns in the Ochese Creek area in 1708, while ten were reported in 1715, with 600 to 730 males of fighting age ("gun men"), and a total population of 2,406 in 1715. A map drawn circa 1715 shows ten named towns around Ochese Creek, with the number of men in each town indicated. Another map, originally drawn in 1725, and redrawn in 1744, shows six towns around Ochese Creek prior to 1715, including one or two that do not appear on the 1715 map. Many of the names on the maps correspond to towns that had been on the Chattahoochee River. The Muskogee- (and Koasati-) speaking towns, Coweta, Kasihta, Tuskegee, and Koloni, were located on the north side of the cluster, near where the Towaliga River joins the Ocmulgee. Some of the Hitchiti-speaking towns, including Ocmulgee, and Hitchiti (Echeetes), were located to the southern part of the Ochese Creek cluster, where Walnut Creek joins the Ocmulgee River (the location of present-day Macon). Sabacola (Sawokli) was located close to the northern group of primarily Muscogee-speaking towns.

Other towns joined the Ochese Creek grouping between 1692 and 1715, including the Muskogee-speaking Atasi (Addasleas or Attases) and Gowalege (Kwadledji), which had previously been located along the Tallapoosa River, Chiaha, from eastern Tennessee or western North Carolina, and a Westo town. Worth states that the town spelled Ewches shown on the 1715 map in the southern cluster of towns may be a mistransciption of any of Yuchi, Hitchiti (Echeetes on the 1725/1744 map), or Uchisi. The Uchisi may have been descendants of the Ichisi people, encountered in the area 150 years earlier by the de Soto expedition, who may have still been living along Ochese Creek when the towns from Apalachicola Province moved there.

Towns near Ochese Creek around 1715 ("Ochese Creek Indians")
1715 map	Men	1725/1744 map	Common English name	Former location
Addasles	20	Attasees	Atasi	Tallapoosa River
Kwadledji	20		Gowalege	Tallapoosa River
Chehaws	20		Chiaha	western North Carolina
Collames	20	Colomies	Koloni	Apalachicola Province
Cowetas	30	Cowetas	Coweta	Apalachicola Province
		Cusitees	Cusseta or Kasihta	Apalachicola Province
		Echeetes	Hitchiti	Apalachicola Province
Ewches	30		Hitchiti, Uchisi, or Yuchi	
Ocounelias	30		Ocmulgee	Apalachicola Province
Sowagles	20		Sowakli	Apalachicola Province
Gaskegas	60	Taskegees	Tuskegee	Apalachicola Province
Westas	15		Westo	

The Ochese Creek towns entered into an extensive trade relationship with the English of Carolina. Males became increasingly involved in hunting deer for hides and raiding other Native American peoples for captives to sell to the English. They became dependent on the English for firearms and ammunition, almost completely abandoning the use of bow and arrow. While European trade goods became common in the Ochese Creek towns, ceramics showed strong continuity with those produced in the towns while they were on the Chattahoochee.

The peoples of the Lamar culture region had traditionally built both winter and summer houses in their towns. A "winter house" or "hot house" was a round house with a sunken floor and a central fireplace, with fully enclosed wattle and daub walls, used as winter lodging. Summer houses were less substantial, and generally rectangular. Towns also had a rotunda (Muscogee tcokofa) next to the public buildings on the town square. This was a large (up to 50 metres (160 ft) across) round structure with wattle and daub walls with a central fireplace, which could be used as a meeting place during cold weather. Rotundas were called "hot houses" because of their resemblance to the winter houses of households. As the people of the towns on Ochese Creek became more involved in the deerskin trade with the English early in the 18th century, adults spent much of the winter living in the woods hunting deer. The town rotundas were big enough for the children and older adults who stayed behind in the towns during the winter to sleep there. Within a few years, construction of winter houses in the Ochese Creek towns had ceased.

== Attacks on Spanish missions ==
The people of the Ochese Creek towns began attacking Spanish missions in 1691. The mission of San Juan de Guacara, where the Spanish trail connecting St. Augustine to Apalachee Province crossed the Suwannee River, and other places were attacked in August 1691. Many of the people at the Chacato missions, west of Apalachee Province, fled in fear. The mission of San Carlos de los Chacatos was attacked in the fall of 1694. Five Chacatos were killed and 42 captives were taken for sale to the English in Carolina. The attack on the Chacatos was reported to have been conducted by men from the towns of Sabacola, Apalachicola, Coweta, and Tiquepache. (Note: Tiquepache was the Spanish name for the town on the Talapoosa River in Alabama that the English called Tukabatchee. It is not clear what relation the Tiquepache involved in this incident had with the town on the Talapoosa.) In retaliation, 400 Apalachee men and seven Spaniards attacked those towns in central Georgia. The Spanish/Apalachee force surprised one town, rescuing eight Chacato captives, and capturing 50 people from the town. The other three towns had been abandoned and were burned by the Apalachees.

Hostilities died down for a few years after 1694. In the winter of 1698–1699, 24 men from Tasquique (Tuskegee) headed to Apalachee with buffalo skins, leather shirts, and bezoar stones as trade goods. A party of 40 Chacatos led by a Spaniard, who were hunting buffalo, found the sleeping Tasquique party and killed 16 of them. Nevertheless, relations between the towns around Ochese Creek and Spanish Florida remained relatively peaceful for a few more years.

In June 1702, 100 men from the Ochese Creek towns who had assembled at Achete (Hitchiti) attacked and burned the Spanish mission of Santa Fe de Toloca on the Santa Fe River. The towns on Ochese Creek decided on war against the Apalachee in the fall of 1702, and attacked the missions of San Antonio de Bacugua and San Cosme y San Damián de Cupaica north of the Apalachee capitol of San Luis (Anhaica). A force of 800 Apalachee men assembled to attack the Ochese Creek towns in retaliation. That force was met on the trail near the Flint River by just over 400 warriors, primarily from the Muscogee- and Hitchiti-speaking towns, but including Chiscas and Westos. The Ochese Creek force was better armed than the Apalachees and caught the Apalachees by surprise in the Battle of Flint River. More than half of the Apalachees were killed or captured, and most of the 300 that escaped abandoned their weapons.

The War of the Spanish Succession, known as Queen Anne's War in the English colonies in North America, had begun in 1701. The English in Carolina attacked Spanish Florida in November 1702. The peoples of what is now the southeastern United States that were allied with the English embarked on continued attacks on Spanish missions and on all the Native peoples associated with the Spanish. In early 1704, James Moore, governor of the English colony of Carolina, led a force of English and Native American fighters in a major assault on Apalachee Province. Demoralized by the defeat on the Flint River two years earlier, the province put up little resistance to the invaders. A substantial part of the Apalachee population went with Moore's force when it left the province.

Another force from the Ochese Creek towns attacked Apalachee Province in June 1704, destroying most of the remaining missions. The Spanish and remaining Apalachees then abandoned the province. Spanish holdings in the interior of Florida were quickly reduced to the Mission San Francisco de Potano near present-day Gainesville, the recently created settlement of Apalachee refugees at Abosaya near Payne's Prairie, and the mission at Salamototo, serving the ferry crossing of the St. Johns River on the trail to St. Augustine. In August and September 1705 forces from the Ochese Creek towns attacked Abosaya, Salamototo, and a village just outside of St. Augustine. The Spanish soon abandoned Potano and Salamototo, and the Ochese Creek forces raided the remaining Spanish territory repeatedly. The Spanish governor estimated that 10,000 to 12,000 Christian Native people had been captured and sold to the English as slaves, and only 300 or so remained in the vicinity of St. Augustine. In 1705, the English entered into an alliance with several of the towns in the Ochese Creek area, including Coweta, Kasihta, Okmulgee, and Kealedji, and others, such as Tukabatchi, Uchises, Oakfusees, and Alabamas.

== Later history ==
A colonial census taken in 1708 described the Apalachicola of the Savannah River as the "Naleathuckles", with 80 men settled in a town about 20 miles up the Savannah River. A more accurate census was taken by Irish colonist John Barnwell in early 1715. It described the Savannah River Apalachicola as living in two villages and having a population of 214 people: 64 men, 71 women, 42 boys, and 37 girls.

In the Yamasee War of 1715, the Apalachicola joined in the Native American attacks on South Carolina. Afterward, the survivors returned to the Apalachicola River, forming near the confluence of the Chattahoochee and Flint rivers. Some later moved north to live along the Chattahoochee River in present-day Russell County, Alabama.

== Lower towns of the Muscogee Confederacy ==
John Swanton concluded that the Muscogee Confederacy (what the English called the Creek Confederacy) was already in existence in the 16th century. Scholars now hold that the Muscogee Confederacy arose in the 18th century. The towns on the Chattahoochee River, which the Spanish called Apalachicola Province, formed a political complex, centered on Coweta. Similar political units existed on the Tallapoosa River, centered on Tuckabatchee, and the Middle Coosa River, centered on Abihka. Those three entities merged to form the Confederacy, with the towns of the old Apalachicola Province becoming known as the Lower towns of the Muscogee Confederacy.

A delegation of leaders from throughout the Muscogee Confederacy visited St. Augustine in 1717. The Spanish identified six provinces in the confederacy, including:

- Cauetta (Coweta) or Apalachicola, with 12 towns,
- Talapusas (on the Talapoosa River), with 26 towns,
- Chiscas, with 70 towns,
- Ayabanos (Alabama), with 29 towns,
- Apisca (Abihka), with 29 towns, and,
- Cuasatte (Coushatta), with 6 towns.

The Lower Towns of the Muscogee Confederacy (the Coweta or Apalachicola province) of the middle 18th century were an amalgamation of old Apalachicola and other groups (Westo, Yuchi, and others). The Lower Towns material culture, especially ceramics, was maintained, despite the absorption of other groups. In 1716, Diego Peña noted the presence of some Alafay (from the Tampa Bay area), Timucua (from interior northern Florida), and Mocama (from coastal northern Florida and southern Georgia) people living in the Chattahoochee River towns.

The town of Apalachicola moved to different locations along the Chattahoochee River in the 18th century, including in a move known to have occurred in 1755. In the 1770s, William Bartram visited both Apalachicola and Apalachicola Old Town. Foster lists a number of archaeological sites in Russell County, Alabama that may have been occupied by Apalachicola at various times.

== Legacy ==
The Apalachicola River is named after the province. The Spanish included what is now called the Chattahoochee River as part of one river, calling all of it from its origins in the southern Appalachian foothills down to the Gulf of Mexico the Apalachicola. Apalachicola Bay and the city of Apalachicola, Florida are named after the river.

== See also ==
- Apalachicola band, a 19th-century group of towns partially descended from towns in Apalachicola Province

== Sources ==
- Bolton, Herbert Eugene (1964). Bannon, John Francis (ed.). Bolton and the Spanish Borderlands. University of Oklahoma Press. p. 138. ISBN 0-8061-0612-3.
- Bushnell, Amy Turner (1991). "Thomas Menéndez Márquez: Criolla, Cattleman, and Contador/Tomás Menéndez Márquez: Criolla, Ganadero y Contador Real". In Ann L. Henderson and Gary L. Mormino (ed.). Spanish Pathways in Florida/Caminos Españoles en La Florida. Sarasota, Florida: Pineapple Press. pp. 119–140. ISBN 1-56164-003-4.
- Ethridge, Robbie (2003). Creek Country: The Creek Indians and Their World. Chapel Hill, North Carolina: The University of North Carolina Press. ISBN 0-8078-2827-0.
- Foster, H. Thomas II (2007). Archaeology of the Lower Muskogee Creek Indians, 1715-1836. The University of Alabama Press. ISBN 978-0-8173-1239-8.
- Foster, H. Thomas II (2022). Apalachicola: Resilience and Adaptation of a Native American Community on the Chattahoochee River. Routledge. ISBN 978-1-032-20125-2.
- Goddard, Ives (Spring 2005). "The Indigenous Languages of the Southeast" (PDF). Anthropological Linguistics. 47 (1): 1–60. JSTOR 25132315 – via Wikipedia Library.
- Hahn, Steven C. (2004). The Invention of the Creek Nation, 1670–1763. University of Nebraska Press. ISBN 0-8032-2414-1.
- Hann, John H. (April 1990). "Summary Guide to Spanish Florida Missions and Visitas. With Churches in the Sixteenth and Seventeenth Centuries". The Americas. 46 (4): 417–513. doi:10.2307/1006866. JSTOR 1006866. S2CID 147329347.
- Hann, John H. (2006). The Native American World Beyond Apalachee. University Press of Florida. ISBN 978-0-8130-2982-5.
- Hudson, Charles; Beck, Robin A. Jr.; DePratter, Chester B.; Ethridge, Robbie; Worth, John E. (Summer 2008). "On Interpreting Cofitacheque". Ethnohistory. 53 (3): 465–490. doi:10.1215/00141801-2008-005 – via academia.edu.
- Knight, Vernon James Jr.; Mistovich, Tim S. (August 31, 1984), Walter F. George Lake Archeological Survey of Fee Owned Lands Alabama and Georgia (Report to U.S. Army Corps of Engineers), Report of Investigations 42, Office of Archaeological Research, pp. 111–112
- Milanich, Jerald T. (1995). Florida Indians and the Invasion from Europe. Gainesville, Florida: University Press of Florida. ISBN 0-8130-1360-7.
- Simpson, J. Clarence (1956). Boyd, Mark F. (ed.). Florida Place-Names of Indian Derivation. Special Publication No. 1. Tallahassee, Florida: Florida Geological Survey.
- Worth, John E. (2000). "The Lower Creeks: Origin and History" (PDF). In McEwan (ed.). Indians of the Greater Southeast: Historical Archaeology and Ethnohistory (Bonnie G. ed.). University of Florida Press. pp. 265–298. ISBN 9-780-8130-2086-0.
