= Sabacola =

Native American town in the Southeastern US

Sabacola (Creek: Svwokle) (Note: As was common with Native American names, Europeans wrote the name of the town and people in a variety of ways. The Spanish recorded the name of the town as Sabacola, Sabocola, Sauocola, and Savacola. The English recorded it as Sawokli, Sauwoogelo, Swaglaw, Sauqoogolo, Sowoolla, and Chaoakle.) was a Native American tribal town in what is now the Southeastern United States of America during the 17th, 18th, and early 19th centuries. Usually regarded as belonging to Apalachicola Province, Sabacola had poorly understood connections to the Apalachee people. Although usually described as speaking the Hitchiti language, at least one source stated that the Sabacola spoke another, unidentified language. The town moved to several locations along the Chattahoochee River, sometimes with more than one town including Sabacola in its name at the same time. The town of Sabacola moved to the Ocmulgee River area of central Georgia for about 25 years, before returning to the Chattahoochee River. Sabacola was the only Apalachicola town to have a mission established by the Spanish. The Apalachicola towns, including Sabacola, evolved into the Lower Towns of the Muscogee Confederacy (called the Lower Creeks by the English).

== Name ==
English and French sources refer to Sabacola as Sawokli, Saowoolla, Chaouakale, Chaogouloux, and Sauwoogelo. The suffix -ukli means 'town' in Hitchiti, and appears frequently in indigenous autonyms in the region. Gatschet refers to Sáwokli, or Sá-ukli, describing it as a Lower Creek town on the west bank of the Chatahuchi river. He says the Hitchiti word sáwi means racoon, and úkli means town.

== Between Apalachee and Apalachicola ==
On first contact with the Spanish in the 17th century, Sabacola was the southernmost of the Apalachicola towns. (Note: Sabacola was probably located at the Blackmon site (1BR25) or the nearby site 1BR30, in Barbour County, Alabama in the 1670s. That site had been abandoned by 1684, as Sabacola had moved south, closer to the juncture of the Chattahoochee and Flint rivers.) The material culture of the Apalachicola towns, including Sabacola, had developed in place over several centuries. The towns on the lower Chattahoochee were likely originally Hitchiti speaking, although Sabacola may have been an exception. Population losses following the passage of the de Soto expedition, even though it did not enter the Chattahoochee Valley, resulted in Muskogee-speaking towns settling among the Apalachicola towns by the mid-16th century. At the same time, at least some of the Apalachicola people may have migrated south towards the Apalachee towns.

Sabacola may have held power rivalling that of the town of Apalachicola (the chief town of Apalachicola Province) for a while, due to its position near the southern end of the Apalachicola towns, close to Apalachee, and to its connections with the Spanish in Apalachee Province. Sabacola had poorly understood ties to the Apalachee. There was an Apalachee village named Sabacola, a satellite of the town of Ocuia in western Apalachee Province, whose residents spoke Apalachee as well as another language. One Spanish report said that the speech of Sabacola was distinct from that of the rest of Apalachicola, and that at least the leaders also spoke Apalachee. Goddard notes that Sawolki (the usual English name for the town) appears to be a Hitchiti name, but that Sabacola is not, but might be Apalachee, instead. Sabacola was the only Apalachicola town whose residents showed interest in becoming Christians, and in having close ties with the Spanish. Apalachee men named Savocola Caurenti and Savacola Adrian were recorded in 1694. Juan Ysfane was the osinudo, or "beloved son", of the town of Sabacola el Grande, and Esfane and Isfane were recorded as names of Apalachee individuals. A connection to the lower part of the Apalachicola River is suggested by reports that "Sabacola" was the name of the eastern mouth of the Apalachicola River delta.

== First mission ==
A mission called Santa Cruz was established by 1675 in the town of Sabacola el Menor, located just south of the juncture of the Chattahoochee and Flint rivers that forms the Apalachicola River. That year, Bishop Gabriel Díaz Vara Calderón of the Diocese of Santiago de Cuba dedicated the mission, renaming it La Incarnación a la Santa Cruz de Sabacola. Attendees at the dedication included the cacique mayor ("great chief") of the town of Sabocola el Grande. The mission was 14 leagues from San Luis, chief town of Apalachee Province, with the other Apalachicola towns 30 leagues to the north. There were less than 30 men at the Santa Cruz de Sabacola mission in 1675. Some Chacato (the Chacato people were centered in the Chipola River valley west of the Apalachicola River) rebelled that summer, unsuccessfully attempting to kill a missionary. Several Spanish soldiers and a number of Apalachee archers were sent to protect the missionary, who had reached Santa Cruz de Sabacola. Chief Baltazar of Santa Cruz de Sabacola told the Spanish after the Chacato rebellion that he would leave with all of his people once the Spanish soldiers left.

In 1676, the Spanish realized that Chiscas living in western Florida, west of the Apalachicola River, were responsible for a number of raids in Apalachee Province in which Christian natives had been killed. The Spanish and Apalachee mounted an expedition against the Chisca in 1677, capturing a Chisca fortification on the Choctawhatchee River. Santa Cruz de Sabacola was still occupied when the expedition against the Chisca passed through, and Chief Baltazar and six men from the town joined the expedition into Chisca territory. The people of Santa Cruz de Sabacola el Menor moved north to join the Apalachicola towns later that year, possibly in fear of retaliation from the Chisca.

== Later missions ==
The people from Santa Cruz de Sabacola el Menor settled in Sabacola el Grande on the Chattahoochee River a few leagues south of the falls at present-day Columbus, near the northern end of the towns in Apalachicola Province. (The earlier site of Sabacola el Grande, which had been at the southern end of the Apalachicola towns in Barbour County, Alabama, was reported to have been abandoned by 1685.) The Christian residents of Sabacola who had moved from Sabacola el Menor requested that missionaries be sent to them. The arrival of 23 new friars in Florida may have made feasible new missionary efforts, and in late 1679, three missionaries, including the friar who had been at Santa Cruz de Sabacola before it moved north, were sent to Apalachicola to minister to the Christian Sabacolas and to convert the Apalachicolas as a counter to the growing English influence in the Chattahoochee valley. The Christians of Sabacola had not informed the chief of Coweta, the strongest town in the Apalachicola Province, of the request. Coweta and other towns associated with it were in communication with the Westos, who were in turn allied with the English in Carolina. On hearing of the arrival of the missionaries, the chief traveled to Sabacola and forced the missionaries to leave three days later.

When the Westos were defeated by the province of Carolina and their allies, the Savannahs, in 1680, some surviving Westos sought refuge at Coweta. The towns on the Chattahoochee that had been friendly with the Westos now turned from the English and sought better relations with the Spanish. In late 1680 the chief of Sabacola went to St. Augustine to request missionaries return to the town. Juan Márquez Cabrera, who had become governor of Spanish Florida in 1680, sent two missionaries back to Sabacola in the summer of 1681, with an escort of 12 Spanish soldiers (later reduced to eight). After a report that some Apalachicolas had killed two Christian Apalachees, more Spanish soldiers were sent to Sabacola, which may have antagonized the Apalachicolas. The missionaries were forced out again a few months later. The missionaries had baptized 36 residents of Sabacola, but were not successful at converting other Apalachicolas, reportly because of errors they made, including not having gifts for the newly converted. Cabrera suspected English influence in the hostility shown the missionaries. Threats from Cabrera led to at least the Christianized residents of the town moving south to a point west of the Flint River just above where it joins the Chattahoochee. A mission named San Carlos de Sabacola was established in the town (called Sabacola Chuba) before 1686. In 1686 Marcos Delgado was sent by Governor Cabrera to discover if the French had established a colony in the vicinity of Mobile Bay. On leaving Apalachee Province he traveled to Sabacola Chuba at the juncture of the Chattahoochee and Flint rivers. A number of residents of Sabacola accompanied Delgado as porters. Sabacola had about 30 families and 30 Christians, including the chief, in 1689. The mission town may have included Chatots from the earlier mission of San Carlos de los Chacatos in present-day Jackson County, Florida.

== Relocations ==
The Spanish built a blockhouse near Coweta in 1689, manned with Spanish soldiers and Apalachee militia. The blockhouse was intended to prevent the English from passing through the area. Instead, the Chattahoochee towns were enticed by trade with the English to move closer to the English settlements in Carolina. Some of the towns moved to the Ochese Creek (later Okmulgee River) area in central Georgia in 1690, with the rest following by the end of 1691, including Sabacola Chuba, which was reported to be uninhabited by 1692. Sabacola, known as Sowagles to the English, was established on the Towaliga River near its juncture with the Ocmulgee River. The Spanish then abandoned the blockhouse on the Chattahoochee River. By 1694, Sabacolas were participating with other "Uchises" (the Spanish name for the people who had settled in the Ochese Creek area) in raids on missions in Apalachee Province.

After the Yamassee War started, the towns along the Okmulgee River, including Sabacola, moved back to the Chattahoochee River in 1716. Chislacalich (Cherokeeleechee, meaning "Cherokee killer", to the English) was the chief of a town settled near the former site of Sabacola where the Chattahoochee and Flint rivers join, while Sabacola was located a little upstream. Chislacaliche traveled to St. Augustine that July (1716) to ask the Spanish to resume friendly relations with the Chattahoochee towns. The Spanish thought he was the emperor of the Province of Coweta (i.e., Apalachicola). The Spanish governor, Pedro de Olivera y Fullana, ordered a retired lieutenant, Diego Peña, to return to the Chattahoochee with Chislacasliche, with orders to determine which chiefs wished to ally with the Spanish, to get such chiefs to travel to St. Augustine to submit themselves to the governor and to try to convince the towns to move into the old Apalachee Province.

Peña kept a journal of his journey, which describes the disposition of the towns on the Chattahoochee River. He crossed the Flint River (which the Spanish called the "Pedernales") where it joined the Apalachicola River, then traveled half a league to the village of Chislacasliche, satellite town of Sabacola. From Chislacasliche, Peña traveled for six days, crossing the Chattahoochee River into Alabama to reach Sabacola. The town of Sabacola was probably then at the McClendon site (1Ru28), south of the mouth of Hatcheechubbee Creek in Russell County, Alabama. Peña travelled two more days to reach the town of Apalachicola, where he met the chiefs and principal men of the Apalachicola towns. Peña reported there were ten towns in the province, including Sabacola, and that Sabacola had 84 warriors, with the other towns having between 28 and 173 warriors each. Peña indicated that the Apalachicola towns spoke four different languages. Mark states that Yamassee, Muscogee, and Hitchiti were spoken by various towns, while Peña stated that the Uchi and Sabacola towns spoke distinct languages.

Peña returned to the towns on the Chattahoochee River again in 1717, trying to recruit six towns to move from the Chattahoochee River to close to the Spanish outpost at San Marcos. Peña reported that while the town of Tasquique spoke Yamassee, and Euchitto (Achito), Apalachicola, and Ocone spoke Uchise (Hitchiti), Uchi and Sabacola spoke different languages. Sabacola was one of the towns Peña stated in October 1717 were expected to move to the mouth of the Wakulla River and the vicinity of San Marcos. Some residents of those towns were Christians. Christians from the town of Sabacola probably moved to the old Apalachee Province as a result of the Spanish entreaties. Some people called Sabacolas were evacuated from San Marco to Havana in 1763, when Spain ceded Florida to Britain.

Sabacola relocated more than once during the 18th century. A 1757 map shows "Ofwaggloe" (Sabacola) on the north side of "Catchefe Creek" (tentatively identified as Little Barbour Creek) where it enters the Chattahoochee River, and "O[fwaggloe]: old town" on the south side of the creek. Site 1RU28, in Russell County, Alabama on the south bank of Hatchechubbee Creek where it joins the Chattahoochee River, has been identified as "probably one of the sites of Sabacola", based on a map from around 1773. In the late 18th century a new settlement called "Big Sauocola" was located on the Alabama side of the Chattahoochee River, possibly at Welaumee Creek, while "Little Sauocola" was on the Georgia side of the river. In 1798/1799, Sabacola was at the Blackmon site (1BR25), close to the 1BR30 site, one of which was the likely site of the town a century before.

== Source ==
- Bolton, Herbert Eugene (1964). Bannon, John Francis (ed.). Bolton and the Spanish Borderlands. University of Oklahoma Press. ISBN 0-8061-0612-3.
- Boyd, Mark F. (July 1937). "The Expedition of Marcos Delgado from Apalachee to the Upper Creek Country in 1686". The Florida Historical Quarterly. 16 (1): 2–32, Map on p. 1. JSTOR 30138266.
- Boyd, Mark F. (July 1949). "Diego Pena's Expedition to Apalachee and Apalchicola in 1716: A Journal Translated and with an Introduction". The Florida Historical Quarterly. 28 (1): 1–27. JSTOR 30138729.
- Boyd, Mark F. (October 1952). "Documents Describing the Second and Third Expeditions of Lieutenant Diego Peña to Apalachee and Apalachicola in 1717 and 1718". The Florida Historical Quarterly. 31 (2): 109–139. JSTOR 30145372.
- Covington, James W. (April 1972). "Apalachee Indians, 1704–1763". The Florida Historical Quarterly. 50 (4): 366–384. JSTOR 30147307.
- Forster, H. Thomas II (2022). Apalachicola: Resilience and Adaptation of a Native American Community on the Chattahoochee River. Routledge. ISBN 978-1-032-20125-2.
- Gatschet, Albert Samuel (1884). A Migration Legend of the Creek Indians: With a Linguistic, Historic and Ethnographic Introduction. D.G. Brinton. p. 144.
- Goddard, Ives (Spring 2005). "The Indigenous Languages of the Southeast" (PDF). Anthropological Linguistics. 47 (1): 1–60. JSTOR 25132315 – via Wikipedia Library.
- Hahn, Steven C. (2004). The Invention of the Creek Nation, 1670–1763. University of Nebraska Press. ISBN 0-8032-2414-1.
- Hann, John H. (April 1990). "Summary Guide to Spanish Florida Missions and Visitas. With Churches in the Sixteenth and Seventeenth Centuries". The Americas. 46 (4): 470–471. doi:10.2307/1006866. JSTOR 1006866. S2CID 147329347.
- Hann, John H. (2006). The Native American World Beyond Apalachee. University Press of Florida. ISBN 978-0-8130-2982-5.
- Knight, Vernon James Jr.; Mistovich, Tim S. (August 31, 1984), Walter F. George Lake Archeological Survey of Fee Owned Lands Alabama and Georgia (Report to U.S. Army Corps of Engineers), Report of Investigations 42, Office of Archaeological Research, pp. 111–112
- Worth, John E. (2000). "The Lower Creeks: Origin and History". In McEwan (ed.). Indians of the Greater Southeast: Historical Archaeology and Ethnohistory (PDF) (Bonnie G. ed.). University of Florida Press. pp. 265–298. ISBN 9-780-8130-2086-0.
