= Pensacola people =

Native American people in Alabama and Florida

The Pensacola were a Native American people who lived in the western part of what is now the Florida Panhandle and southwestern Alabama for centuries before first contact with Europeans until early in the 18th century. They spoke a Muskogean language. They are the source of the name of Pensacola Bay and the city of Pensacola. They lived in the area until the mid-18th century, but were thereafter assimilated into other groups.

== Pensacola culture ==
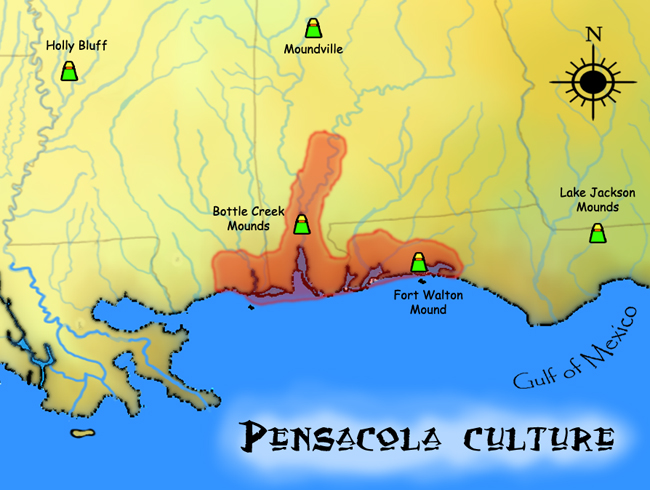
Geographic extent of Pensacola culture and some of its important sites

The historical Pensacola people lived in part of a region once occupied by a group that archaeologists call the Pensacola culture, a regional variation of the Mississippian culture that lasted from 1100 to 1700 CE. The archaeological culture covers an area stretching from a transitional Pensacola/Fort Walton culture zone at Choctawhatchee Bay in Florida to the eastern side of the Mississippi River Delta near Biloxi, Mississippi, with the majority of its sites located along Mobile Bay in the Mobile-Tensaw River Delta. Sites for the culture stretched inland, north into the southern Tombigbee and Alabama River valleys, as far as the vicinity of Selma, Alabama. (The Fort Walton culture continued to exist in the Florida Panhandle to the east of the Pensacola area into the period of European colonization.)

Perhaps the best known Pensacola culture site is the Bottle Creek Indian Mounds site, a large site located on a low swampy island north of Mobile, Alabama. This site has at least eighteen platform mounds; five of which are arranged around a central plaza. Its main occupation was from 1250 to 1550. It was a ceremonial center for the Pensacola culture peoples, and a gateway to their society. This site seems like an unlikely place to find a ceremonial center because it is surrounded by swamps and is difficult to reach on foot. However, it would have been easy access by a dugout canoe, the main mode of transportation available to the people who built the Bottle Creek site.

== Early contacts ==
The Pensacola's first contact with Europeans may have been with the Narváez expedition in 1528. Cabeza de Vaca reported that the Indians they encountered in the vicinity of what is now Pensacola Bay were of "large stature and well formed," and lived in permanent houses. The cacique wore a robe of what de Vaca called "civet-marten", "the best [skins], I think, that can be found." After initially appearing to be friendly, the Indians attacked the Spaniards without warning during the night.

In 1539 Diego Maldonado, exploring the northern coast of the Gulf of Mexico under orders from Hernando de Soto, found Pensacola Bay (which the Spanish called the Bay of Achuse, Achusi, Ochuse or Ochus). Maldonado found a village on the bay, where he seized one or two of the inhabitants, along with a "good blanket of sables." De Soto ordered Maldonado to meet him at the Bay of Achuse the next summer with supplies for his expedition. Maldonado returned three years in succession, but de Soto never appeared.

In 1559 Tristán de Luna y Arellano led an expedition to establish the Spanish colony of Ochuse on Pensacola Bay, then known as the Bay of Ichuse (also spelled Ychuse). The Spanish had planned to rely on the Indians for food supplies, but found the area almost deserted, with only a few Indians in fishing camps around the bay. The colony lost hundreds of people through storms and disease. Some tried to relocate to Santa Elena (present-day Parris Island, South Carolina), but were damaged by storms there, too. Survivors moved on to Cuba and Mexico City.

== Panzacola ==
The first record of the name "Pensacola" was as Panzacola (or Pansacola) in 1657 as the name of a village associated with the mission of San Juan De Aspalaga in the Apalachee Province (Pansacola was a common surname among the Apalachee). In 1685 the Spanish became concerned over reports that the French were trying to establish a colony on coast of the Gulf of Mexico. Over the next few years the Spanish searched for the rumored French colony, and for a good site for a Spanish colony to protect their interests in the area. The name Panzacola first was recorded in association with Pensacola Bay when Juan Jordan de Reina entered the bay in 1686; he found local Indians who called themselves and the bay Panzacola. That same year a letter reported that Panzacola could be reached by canoe by travelling west from San Marcos de Apalachee, placing it twelve leagues from the "Indians of Mobile". (Note: A date of 1606 has been attributed to the letter, but Hahn asserts that the correct date is 1686.) Panzacola is reported to have meant "long-haired people" or "hair people" in the Pensacola language. The Pensacola language was closely related to or the same as that of other peoples in western Florida, including the Amacano, Chatot, Chine, and Pacara, and was closely related to the Choctaw language (a Muskogean language).

Another expedition in 1688 found large, prosperous villages of "gentle and docile" Indians. In 1693 two expeditions, one from Vera Cruz in New Spain and another from Apalachee, found the area around Pensacola Bay nearly deserted, supposedly due to the Pensacola being wiped out in a war with the Mobile. The Spanish did find two small bands of Chacato (who were closely related to the Pensacola) in the area of Pensacola Bay that year. Swanton states that the Pensacola had not been killed, but had moved inland and to the west.

== Final years ==
A Spanish colony was established at Pensacola Bay in 1698, given the name Pensacola. The governor of Pensacola, anxious to have Indians living in the area to help provision and defend the new colony, met with a few Pensacolas and Chacatos, and urged them to move their villages closer to Pensacola. However, by 1707 the only Indians living near the Spanish fort were called Ocatazes by the Spanish. In 1725 or 1726 a village of Pensacolas and Biloxis on the Pearl River was reported to have no more than 40 men. In 1764 a village of Pensacola, Biloxi, Chacato, Capinan, Washa, Cawasha, and Pascagoula had 261 men. After 1764 most of the Pensacola are believed to have been assimilated into the Choctaw, but some may have gone to Louisiana with the Biloxi and merged into the Tunica-Biloxi, or been assimilated by Creek bands that moved into the area.

== Other "Pensacola Indians" ==
From time to time various groups of Indians moved to the vicinity of the Spanish fort at Pensacola and were sometimes recorded as "Pensacola Indians". In 1704, 800 refugees from the Apalachee massacre reached Pensacola. The governor of Pensacola tried to persuade them to stay there, but most moved on to French Mobile. Some Apalachee moved back to Pensacola, and then onward to near San Marcos de Apalachee. By 1763 there were about 40 families of Apalachee living at Pensacola. In that year, at the end of the Seven Years' War and Britain's defeat of France, the Spanish evacuated more than 200 Yemassee and Apalachee to Vera Cruz in Mexico before they turned Florida over to the British. (Note: The Apalachee and Yemassee evacuated to Vera Cruz in 1763 are sometimes called "Pensacola Indians".)
