= Choctaw Point Light =

- Location: Choctaw Point south of Mobile, Alabama
- Coordinates: 30°40′N 87°59′W

Tower
- Construction: brick
- Height: 43 feet (13 m)
- Shape: conical tower

Light
- First lit: 1831
- Deactivated: 1862
- Focal height: 63 feet (19 m)

The Choctaw Point Light was a lighthouse located just south of Mobile, Alabama on the west shore of Mobile Bay.

== History ==
Mobile Bay is quite shallow, and dredging began in 1826 using a machine developed by John Grant, a sea captain in the area. The channel opened the city up to greater traffic and in 1831 a brick tower was constructed on Choctaw Point, which projected from the west shore somewhat south of town. It was considered poorly sited by pilots due to its lack of alignment with the channels.

The beacon was extinguished at the outset of the Civil War and was never relit. The site was used for a buoy depot and railroad wharves; today it is occupied by a container shipping terminal, and no trace of the light remains.
