= Waddells Mill Pond Site =

Archaeological site in Florida, United States

- U.S. National Register of Historic Places
- Location within Florida Location within the United States
- Location: Jackson County, Florida
- Nearest city: Marianna
- Coordinates: 30°52′22″N 85°19′39″W
- NRHP reference No.: 72000327
- Added to NRHP: December 15, 1972

The Waddells Mill Pond Site is an archaeological site located seven miles (11 km) northwest of Marianna, Florida. On December 15, 1972, it was added to the U.S. National Register of Historic Places.

This was the site of an important late prehistoric mound and village complex. Archaeological excavations at the site during the 1960s and 1970s revealed two mounds and the remains of a circular fortification. The site is believed to have been abandoned prior to the arrival of the Spanish in the region in 1674.

== See also ==
- Fort Walton Culture
- Mississippian culture
