= Cusseta (tribal town) =

Coordinates: 32°21′58″N 84°58′09″W

Cusseta (Creek: Kvsehtv), also known as Kasihta, was a Peace Town of the Lower Towns, a division of the Muscogee Confederacy. It was located in what the Spanish called Apalachicola Province on the Chattahoochee River, then in what is now the state of Georgia near the Ocmulgee River, and finally again on the Chattahoochee River. It was one of the two major towns of the Lower Creek, with a population of 1,918 in 1832.

== Origins ==
According to Muscogee oral history, early Creek from Ocmulgee settled Cusseta and Coweta, approximately around 900–1000 CE.

== 18th–19th centuries ==
After the Yamasee War, the people of Cusseta moved from the Chattahoochee River and rebuilt their town on the Ocmulgee River. Until the 1830s forced removal of the Creek Indians from Georgia and Alabama, Cusseta was one of the oldest and most significant Creek towns. The census of 1832–33 recorded 1,918 residents living in Cusseta.

At the town on 24 March 1832, representatives of the Creek Nation signed the Treaty of Cusseta, ceding all the Nation's lands east of the Mississippi River to the United States as part of Indian Removal. They were to receive territory in exchange west of the Mississippi, in what was then called Indian Territory, and annuities for their land.

== Today ==
Lawson Army Airfield in Fort Benning, Georgia was developed on the former site of Cusseta. The modern-day municipality of Cusseta, Georgia is named after the Muscogee Creek town and located closest to the historic site. Cusseta, Alabama is also named after the historic town.
