= San Pedro y San Pablo de Patale =

- U.S. National Register of Historic Places
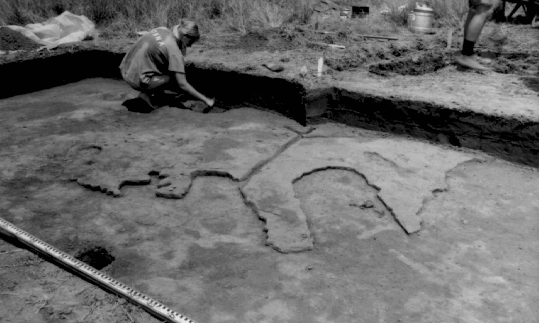

- Location within Florida Location within the United States
- Location: Leon County, Florida
- Nearest city: Tallahassee
- Coordinates: 30°28′2″N 84°9′0.8″W
- NRHP reference No.: 72000336
- Added to NRHP: June 26, 1972

San Pedro y San Pablo de Patale was a Spanish Franciscan mission built in the early 17th century in the Florida Panhandle, six miles east of Tallahassee, Florida. It was part of Spain's effort to colonize the region, and convert the Timucuan and Apalachee Indians to Christianity. The mission lasted until 1704, when it was captured by a militia of Creek Indians and South Carolinians.

The site where the mission stood was added to the U.S. National Register of Historic Places on June 26, 1972.

== See also ==
- Spanish missions in Florida
