= Mark Frederick Boyd =

American public health physician and writer

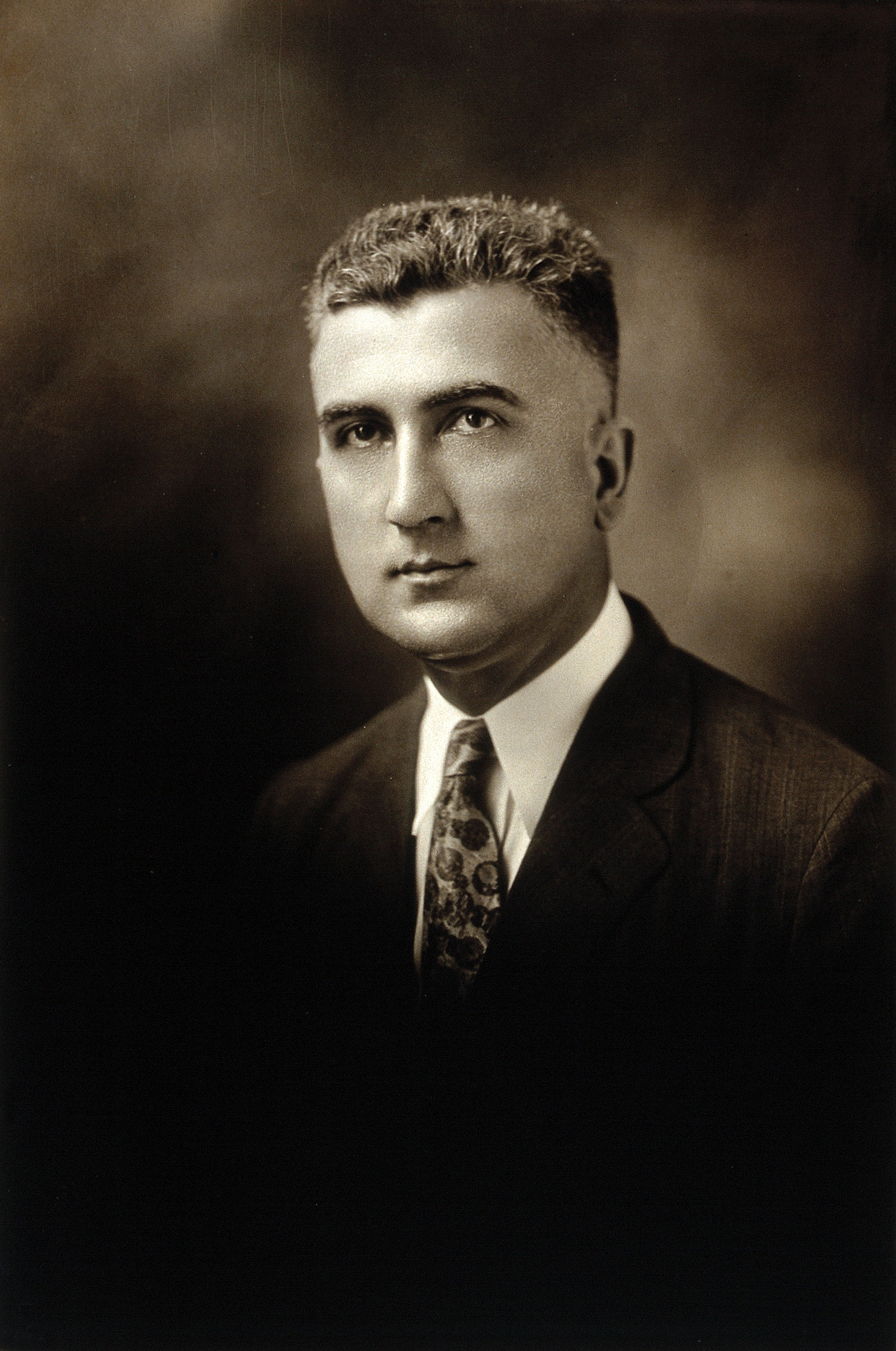
- Mark Frederick Boyd
- Born: May 21, 1889; St. Paul, Minnesota
- Died: May 31, 1968 (aged 79); Tallahassee, Florida
- Occupation: Malaria specialist
- Spouse: Ruth Harris Boyd
- Children: Three daughters

Mark Frederick Boyd (1889–1968) was an American physician and writer. He taught and performed research in public health. He went to work for the Rockefeller Foundation in 1921, and thereafter specialized in the study of malaria. He also wrote about the history of Florida.

== Education and early career ==
Boyd received a Doctor of Medicine degree from the State University of Iowa in 1911, and a Master of Science degree from there in 1913. He worked as a public health officer in Iowa, an instructor in pathology and bacteriology and later as an associate professor of preventive medicine at the State University of Iowa. He was a teaching fellow in hygiene at Harvard Medical School and an associate professor of bacteriology and hygiene at the University of Nevada. He was the first head of the Department of Bacteriology and Preventive Medicine at the University of Texas Medical Branch. He was a member of the Nevada State Board of Health, epidemiologist for the Iowa State Board of Health, and served two years as a reserve officer in the United States Public Health Service, in charge of the service's plague laboratory in Galveston, Texas, which was established to fight the 1920 epidemic of bubonic plague in that city.

Boyd became a staff member of the International Health Board of the Rockefeller Foundation in 1921, remaining with that institution until his retirement in 1947. He directed the International Health Board study of the epidemiology of malaria in the state of Rio de Janeiro, Brazil from 1922 to 1925. Returning to the United States, he served as director of the Rockefeller Foundations's malaria field study stations in Leesburg, Georgia and Edenton, North Carolina. He was director of the foundation's malaria field study station in Jamaica in 1928. Returning again to the United States, he served as director of the Division of Malaria Control of the Mississippi State Board of Health.

== Later career ==
The Rockefeller Foundation sent Boyd to Tallahassee, Florida in 1931 to establish a research laboratory at the Florida State College for Women, where he had full faculty privileges. He then began studying the use of malariotherapy at the Florida State Hospital. Malariotherapy, a type of pyrotherapy, was an attempt to treat syphilis by introducing malaria parasites into syphilis patients. The fevers induced by malaria killed the bacteria (Treponema pallidum) that causes syphilis. The treatment was widely studied and employed in the first half of the 20th century. While the study of malariotherapy was usually focused on the syphilis infections, Boyd concentrated his studies on malaria.

Boyd was an advisor and consultant on malaria to the Tennessee Valley Authority, the Pan American Sanitary Bureau, the League of Nations, and the United States Army. He attended international conferences as a delegate for the United States, and served on national boards related to tropical diseases. He was president of the American Society of Tropical Medicine in 1938, and president of the American Academy of Tropical Medicine in 1945. He was secretary of the National Malaria Society for 15 years and was elected president in 1946. He was editor of the American Journal of Tropical Medicine in 1947.

In 1950, he was awarded an honorary Doctor of Science degree by Florida State University.

Boyd also studied and wrote about the history of Florida, in particular about Spanish Florida and Native American groups. He was president of the Florida Historical Society from 1946 until 1949.

== Works ==
Boyd published several books in medicine and history, including:

- (1925) Preventive Medicine
- (1926) Studies of the Epidemiology of Malaria in the Coastal Lowlands of Brazil, Made Before and After the Execution of Control Measures
- (1930) An Introduction to Malariology
- (1939) Conferencias Sobre Malaria Ofrecidas En El Instituto Finlay (in Spanish)
- (1949) Malariology: A Comprehensive Survey of All Aspects of this Group of Diseases from a Global Standpoint (editor, two volumes)
- (1951) Here They Once Stood: The Tragic End of the Apalachee Missions (with Hale G. Smith and John W. Griffin)
- (1951) Historic Sites in and around the Jim Woodruff Reservoir Area, Florida-Georgia

He also published approximately 140 articles on health and medical topics, and more than 20 articles in history journals.
