= Tawasa people =

Native American tribe in Alabama

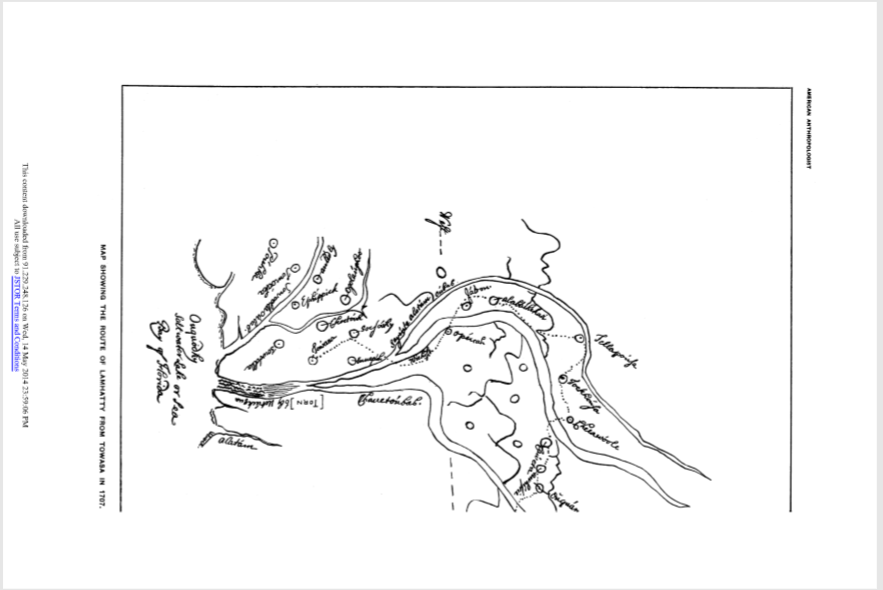
Partition of the Map of Lamhatty

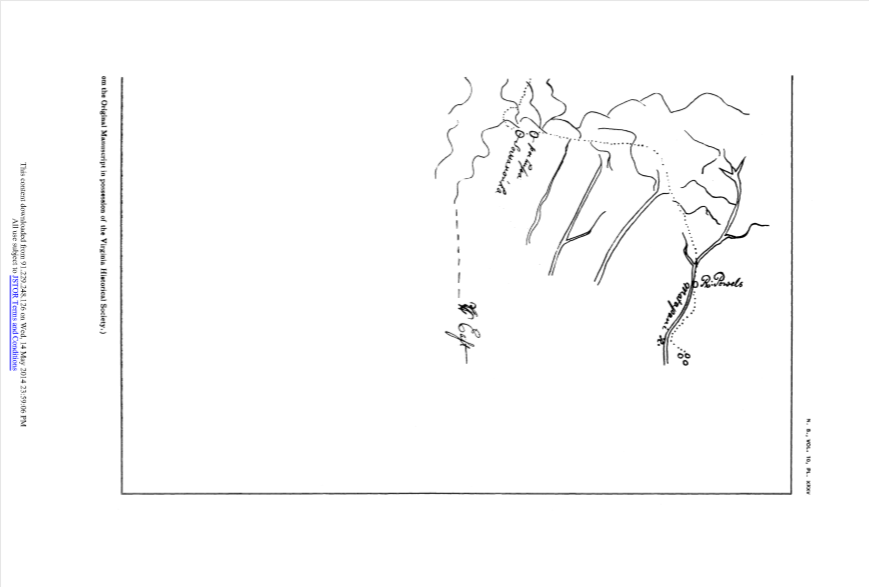
Partition of the Map of Lamhatty

The Tawasa Indian Tribe, also known as the Alibamu Indian Tribe, was located near the Alabama River, in Autauga County, Alabama. The population of the tribe was known to be around 330 members, all living in or near what were known as the Tawasa and Autauga Towns. The tribe existed around the late 1600s, early 1700s, however somewhat disappeared in the early 1700s, due to violence and fleeing. The tribe was split, with around 60 members joining the Alabama tribe, at Fort Toulouse. Some time later, the tribe at Fort Toulouse migrated south joining various tribes in Florida. For the remaining count, there is little evidence to show where they all went, however there is evidence to show that some ended up in Oklahoma, along with some Creeks who migrated there.

== History ==
In the early 1500s, the nomadic Tawasa tribe was found by Hernando De Soto, near central Alabama. Almost two centuries later, the Tawasa were ambushed by other tribes, who enslaved and relocated some of them. As for those who were able to get away, many accepted the help of the French and sought freedom in southern Alabama, near Mobile. Around a decade later, the tribe relocated again, near their original location of settlement, in central Alabama. The Tawasa remained where they were for around a century that is, until the Treaty of Fort Jackson, in 1814. After the signing of the treaty, the tribe relocated again, this time northeast of their old establishment, near Wetumpka. The tribe broke apart at that point, with some members joining the Creeks, some joining the Seminoles, and others unaccounted for.

== Language ==
The Indians had their own language known as the Tawasa language, however there have been accounts of other tribes noticing only small differences between the Tawasa language and theirs. The Tawasa people were known to have spoken a very similar language to the Alabama tribe, however linguistic evidence has been shown that the Tawasa showed some of the same words and dialect choices resembled more of the Hitchiti tribe.

== The Account of Lamhatty ==
The Account of Lamhatty refers to a document that lists remembrances from a Tawasan Indian known as Lamhatty, who was captured and enslaved by Creek Natives. The document was interpreted by historian Robert Beverly, who sat down with Lamhatty to learn about and document his travels and experiences with other tribes. The article includes descriptions of tribes encountered, and mappings of how and where the tribes made settlements. Lamhatty was originally a part of the Tawasa Tribe, however when he was captured he was sold to another tribe known as the Shawnee Indians. Lamhatty stayed with the Shawnee tribe, until he escaped to find refuge with the English, in Virginia. At this time, Lamhatty met Beverly, who then began to break down Lamhatty's travels.

== Similar tribes ==
- Pawokti
- Alabama
