= Apalachee Province =

Area in present-day Florida

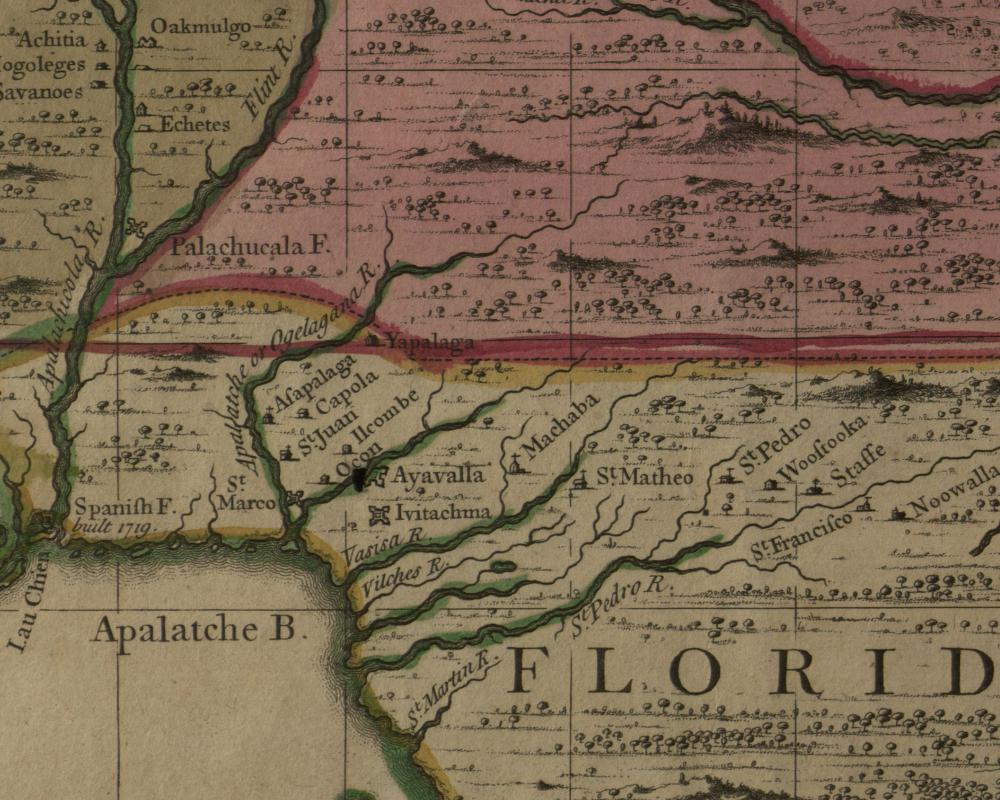
Map detail showing northwestern Florida, including the region of the Spanish Apalachee Province. This area was the scene of the 1704 Apalachee massacre, but does not accurately represent the location of all of the missions affected.

Apalachee Province was a polity in the Panhandle of the present-day U.S. state of Florida governed by an Indigenous tribe called the Apalachee by Europeans. Their material remains are part of the southernmost extent of the Mississippian period. The Apalachee governed what is now Leon County, Wakulla County and Jefferson County. The name was in use during the early period of European exploration. During Spanish colonization, the Apalachee Province became one of the four major provinces in the Spanish mission system, the others being the Timucua Province, (between the St. Johns and Suwanee Rivers), the Mocama Province (along the Atlantic coast of what is now northern Florida and southern Georgia) and the Guale Province (along the Georgia coast north of the Altamaha River).

== History ==
Since 12,000 years ago, groups of Native Americas inhabited the hilltops and lake shores of what are now Leon County and Jefferson County. They lived by hunting, fishing and gathering. Eventually they became permanently sedentary, making stone tools, pottery, and then domesticating plants. By 1000 A.D., they developed agriculture and cultivated numerous plants, particularly varieties of maize, as the main staple food. Native Americans lived in many towns and farmsteads, gradually growing agricultural surpluses that supported larger populations.

Apalachee Province was closely linked by trading and cultural exchange to other Native American nations throughout the interior Southeast, including the later Southeastern Ceremonial Complex (SECC). As many as 60,000 people lived in 40 towns in Apalachee Province. Growth of maize aided in the construction of towns and more complex material cultures. Leaders organized workers to construct complex earthworks such as mounds, for religious, political and ceremonial purposes.

The Apalachee occupied what archaeologists call the Velda Mound site from about 1450 CE-1625 CE, although they mostly abandoned the site soon after the beginning of the Spanish Mission Period, c. 1565. After the Spanish began colonization and brought in missions, they called this area the Apalachee Province.

The Apalachee Province was heavily depopulated because of Carolina Governor James Moore's raids into the area during Queen Anne's War. Most of the Spanish missions in the province were destroyed during the Apalachee massacre.

== Towns ==
- Anhaica was the capital of Apalachee Province, located near Myers Park in Tallahassee.
- Lake Jackson Mound site is located on the southern shore of Lake Jackson.
- Oconi or Ocone was a town in the eastern part of the province. In 1657 the mission San Francisco de Ocone was recorded in the town. That year the town had one satellite village. A mission church may have been built in Oconi as early as 1612. The residents of Oconi claimed in 1657 that it was the first place in Apalachee in which Christianity had been established. The Scott Miller site (8JE2) in Jefferson County near Waukeenah may be that of San Francisco de Oconi, although it has also been said to be the site of Ayubale.
- Velda Mound was the center of an older town located north of Tallahassee. It is now within the Killearn Estates neighborhood.

== See also ==
- Mission San Luis de Apalachee
