= Gov. John W. Martin House =

Historic house in Florida, United States

- U.S. National Register of Historic Places

- Location within Florida Location within the United States
- Location: 1001 Governor's Drive, Tallahassee, Florida
- Coordinates: 30°26′08.71″N 84°16′07.81″W
- Area: 6.21 acres (2.51 ha)
- Built: c. 1933
- Architectural style: Georgian Revival
- NRHP reference No.: 86000024
- Added to NRHP: January 6, 1986

The Gov. John W. Martin House (also known as Apalachee) is a historic house in Tallahassee, Florida. After serving as governor of Florida from 1925 to 1929 and then running a few unsuccessful campaigns, John W. Martin built this Georgian Revival-style home around 1933 within the borders of DeSoto Site Historic State Park. However, he only resided in this house until 1941 and lived the rest of his life in Jacksonville, before dying in St. Augustine in 1958. On January 6, 1986, it was added to the U.S. National Register of Historic Places. About a year after this designation, an archaeologist affiliated with Florida's Bureau of Archaeological Research concluded that Martin's property was a winter camp for Hernando de Soto and his group of explorers. There, they celebrated Christmas in 1539, one of the earliest known instances of that holiday being observed in what became the United States.

== History and description ==
The namesake of the house is John W. Martin, a Florida politician who served as mayor of Jacksonville from 1917 to 1923 and governor from 1925 to 1929. During his tenure as governor, Martin County was established and also named after him. Because the Florida Constitution at the time forbade a governor from succeeding themselves, Martin ran for United States Senate in 1928 but lost. He then ran for a second, non-consecutive term for governor in 1932 but was again defeated.

Shortly before the end of Martin's term as governor, he purchased approximately 27.5 acres (11.1 ha) of land in Tallahassee less than 1 mile (1.6 km) east of the Florida State Capitol building. It is not precisely known when the Gov. John W. Martin House, also known as Apalachee, was not constructed or the name of the architect who designed the residence. Martin's niece, Mrs. Granville E. Batey, recalled visiting the home between 1933 and 1937, when she attended Florida State College for Women (now known as Florida State University). W. Carl Shiver noted in the National Register of Historic Places (NRHP) registration form that "no record survives naming the architect who designed Apalachee. It is likely that there was one, however, as the formal character of the Georgian Revival structure suggests a well-schooled academic architectural background." Shiver also suggested that Malachi Leo Elliott of Tampa may have done so due to being in Tallahassee in May 1933, the same time as Martin.

However, Martin and his family only lived at this home for seven or eight years, selling his property to developers in 1941 and moving to Jacksonville, where he lived the remainder of his life until dying in St. Augustine in 1958. Since the development of most of his 27.5 acres (11.1 ha) from 1941 onward, the Gov. John W. Martin House site has covered 6.21 acres (2.51 ha). Within the house, which is one-story in height, are five bathrooms, three bedrooms, and two dining rooms and a den, foyer, kitchen, laundry room, and screen-enclosed back porch.

Florida Historical Marker #426

On January 6, 1986, the Gov. John W. Martin House was listed on the NRHP. Arguing for its importance, Shiver noted that "it is significant because of its association with one of Florida's youngest and most progressive governor's, its association with 'country estates' constructed in the vicinity of Tallahassee prior to World War II, and for being a good, although not extraordinary, example of a Georgian Revival style house adapted to a 'rural' setting." About one year later, a construction company began working on the land to restore the home and construct two office buildings discovered artifacts. B. Calvin Jones of Florida's Bureau of Archaeological Research concluded that the land was previously used as a winter camp for Hernando de Soto and his group of explorers between 1539 and 1540. There, they celebrated Christmas in 1539, believed at the time (in 1987) to be the earliest known observation of that holiday in what became the United States. However, evidence suggests that Pánfilo de Narváez and his entourage did so along the coast of Texas in 1528. Also uncovered at Martin's former property were artifacts supporting the existence of Anhaica, the principal town of the Apalachee tribe. Thus, the Gov. John W. Martin House is now part of the DeSoto Site Historic State Park.

== See also ==
- History of Tallahassee, Florida
- National Register of Historic Places listings in Leon County, Florida
- List of sites and peoples visited by the Hernando de Soto Expedition
