= Lake Jackson Mounds Archaeological State Park =

State park in Florida, United States

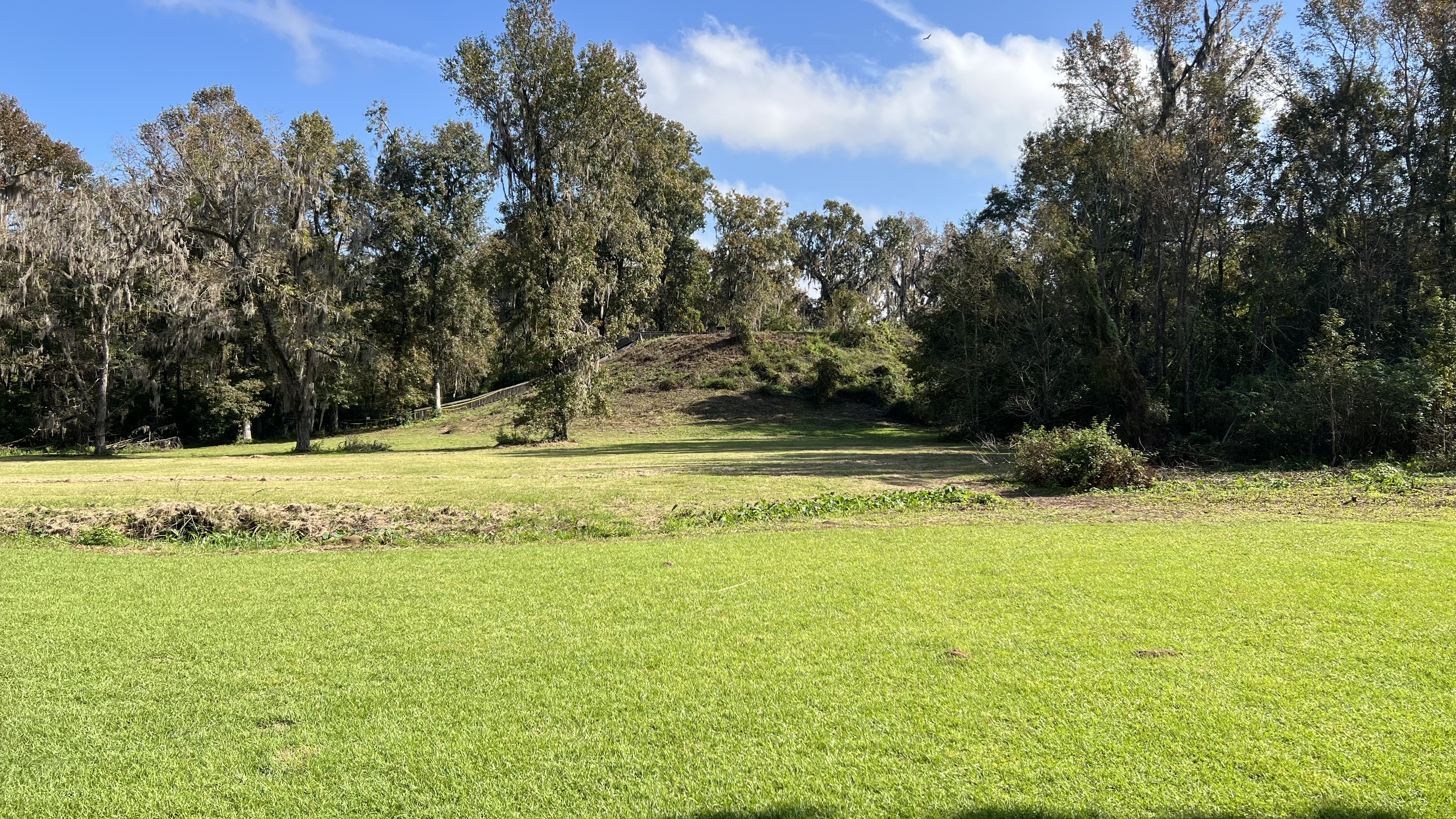
- Mound 2, the largest surviving earthwork at the site

- Location within Florida Location within the United States
- Interactive map of Lake Jackson Mounds Archaeological State Park
- Location: Leon County, Florida, USA
- Nearest city: Tallahassee, Florida
- Coordinates: 30°30′00″N 84°18′49″W
- Area: 199.81 acres (80.86 ha)
- Established: May 26, 1966; 60 years ago
- Governing body: Florida Department of Environmental Protection
- Lake Jackson Mounds
- U.S. National Register of Historic Places
- NRHP reference No.: 71000241
- Added to NRHP: 6 May 1971

Lake Jackson Mounds Archaeological State Park is a 199.81-acre (80.86 ha) (Note: The park's 2004 and 2016 unit management plans give its size as 204.94 acres; the current figure is from the Division of Recreation and Parks' 2026 jurisdiction report, which is based on GIS mapping.) Florida state park in Leon County, Florida, about 5 miles (8.0 km) north of downtown Tallahassee. It preserves the Lake Jackson Mounds (8LE1), (Note: 8LE1 is the site's number in the Florida Master Site File, the state's inventory of archaeological and historical sites.) the capital of a chiefdom of the Fort Walton culture that occupied the region between about 1050 and 1500 and one of the largest Mississippian mound centers in the lower Southeast.

At its height the complex comprised seven earthen mounds, six of them platform mounds, set around one or more plazas, together with village residences and surrounding farmland. The largest, Mound 2, rose about 36 ft (11 m) and probably carried the residence of the paramount chief. Nearby Mound 3 served as a mortuary temple; the burials excavated from it yielded repoussé copper plates, engraved shell gorgets, and other elite objects in the Southeastern Ceremonial Complex style, many of them reflecting a long exchange relationship with the Etowah chiefdom in Georgia. Mound 3 lay on private land and was leveled for fill dirt in 1975–1976, prompting a salvage excavation that recorded its contents.

After the site was abandoned around 1500, the chiefdom's seat moved to Anhaica, whose inhabitants the de Soto expedition met in 1539 as the Apalachee. Surveyors recorded the mounds as early as 1852, and archaeologists including Gordon Willey, John Griffin, B. Calvin Jones, and Claudine Payne investigated the site from 1940 onward. Florida began acquiring the property and established the park in 1966, and the site was listed on the National Register of Historic Places in 1971. It is administered by the Florida Park Service.

Today the park protects upland hardwood forest, bottomland forest, and a steephead ravine system draining to Lake Jackson, and offers hiking trails and interpretive exhibits. It forms part of the Florida Greenways and Trails System and lies within the Florida Wildlife Corridor.

== History ==
=== Early inhabitants ===
The site was built and occupied between 1050 and 1500 by people of the Fort Walton culture, the southernmost regional expression of the Mississippian culture. The scale of the site and the number and size of the mounds indicate that this was the site of a regional chiefdom, and was thus a political and religious center. After the abandonment of the Lake Jackson site the chiefdom seat was moved to Anhaica (rediscovered in 1987 by B. Calvin Jones and located within DeSoto Site Historic State Park), where in 1539 it was visited by the Hernando de Soto entrada, who knew the residents as the historic Muskogean-speaking Apalachee people. Whether the Fort Walton people who built Lake Jackson were the direct ancestors of the historic Apalachee is widely assumed but not firmly established; because less than one percent of the site has been professionally excavated, some researchers hold that the population's cultural affiliation remains an open question. Other related Fort Walton sites are located at Velda Mound, Cayson Mound and Village Site and Yon Mound and Village Site.

Although the mounds were built and used during the Fort Walton period, the earliest occupation evidence at the site may date to the Early Archaic; the complex is nonetheless known primarily for its Fort Walton materials. Archaeological sites around the wider Lake Jackson basin record human presence from the Early to Middle Archaic period onward.

=== Territorial period ===
Following the abandonment of the mound complex, the surrounding land was eventually incorporated into a larger estate owned by Colonel Robert Butler during Florida's Territorial period (1820–1860); a water-powered grist mill known as Butler Mill operated on the property in the 19th century, and its ruins survive within the park.

=== State acquisition ===
In May 1966, a T-shaped tract containing 11.5 acres (4.7 ha) was purchased by the State of Florida and designated the Lake Jackson Mounds State Archaeological Site. (Note: The 2016 management plan gives the initial purchase, made on May 26, 1966, as about 10 acres (4.0 ha).) In August 1966 the state leased the property to the Florida Board of Parks and Historic Memorials, a predecessor of the present Division of Recreation and Parks. At the time of this purchase, three-quarters of Mound 2 was in the park, all of Mound 4 was included in the park, and about half of Mound 5, with the remaining mounds still privately owned. Additional tracts were purchased in subsequent decades, and Mound 1 remains the only mound outside the park boundary. The site was added to the National Register of Historic Places on May 6, 1971.

== Archaeology ==
=== Research history ===
The mounds first entered the documentary record through land surveys. James and John Donelson surveyed the township in 1825 without noting the earthworks, but in 1852 a General Land Office surveyor, A. M. Randolph, mapped "three indian mounds" near the lake and recorded that the land was then owned by Colonel Robert Butler. The first published notice came in 1918, when Nels C. Nelson of the American Museum of Natural History reported having visited, the previous year, "a group of artificial sandmounds on the shore of Lake Jackson near Tallahassee." In 1939 the historian Mark F. Boyd described the site in a study of 17th-century Spanish missions, believing it might correspond to the mission of San Damián de Escambé.

The first archaeological fieldwork was carried out in June 1940 by Gordon Willey and Richard Woodbury, two Columbia University graduate students who were surveying the Florida Gulf coast for the National Park Service. Their work was limited to two 9.8-by-9.8-foot (3 by 3 m) test units placed north and south of Mound 2; the northern unit produced Fort Walton sherds to a depth of about 20 inches (50 cm), while the southern unit was nearly sterile. In 1947 John Griffin excavated a large block between Mounds 2 and 4, exposing dense occupation debris and features that led him to identify a cleared plaza. Mound 1 was tested in the mid-1950s by Charles H. Fairbanks and Hale G. Smith of Florida State University. Ahead of park construction projects, Daniel Penton excavated test pits north and east of Mound 2 in 1968, and in December 1969 Frank Fryman opened 300 square feet (28 m^{2}) at a proposed building site north of Mound 4. The most consequential fieldwork came in the winter of 1975–1976, when B. Calvin Jones conducted a salvage excavation of Mound 3 ahead of its destruction, recovering the copper-plate burials for which the site is best known. Claudine Payne synthesized the accumulated work in a 1994 dissertation that established the site's ceramic chronology, and later research has applied ground-penetrating radar and off-mound survey to map the settlement beyond the mound precinct.

=== Mound complex ===
When the site was abandoned, its mound precinct covered 47 acres (19.0 ha) and held seven mounds: six in a main group on both sides of Butler Mill Creek, and a seventh (Mound 1) about 1,300 ft (400 m) to the north. Six were flat-topped platform mounds; the form of the seventh, a low rounded mound, cannot be determined. The mounds were built up over many years through the organized labor of a large workforce. The ceremonial plaza was a broad area, deliberately constructed and leveled, where ritual games and gatherings took place. Around the mounds and plaza were several areas of dense village habitation with individual residences, where artisans and workers lived. Maize was cultivated in communal fields in the surrounding countryside, sustaining the site's large population. Mound 3 has been the most fully excavated of the seven mounds; the others have seen only limited testing.

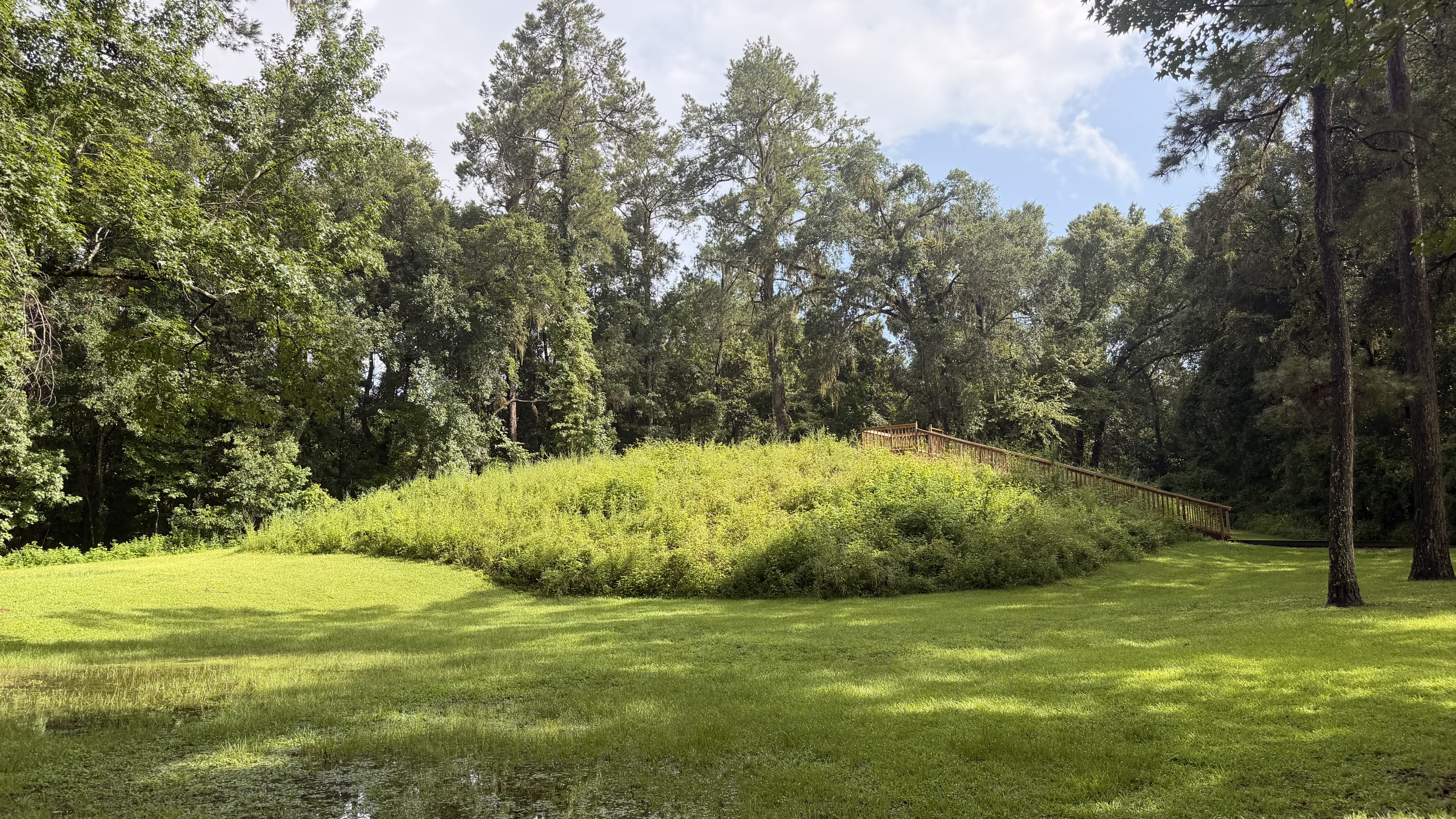
Lake Jackson Mound 4

The arrangement of the mounds in the central part of the site suggests that there may have been two plazas. Mounds 2, 3, 4, and 5 form a large rectangular shape that was mostly free of debris. Mounds 2, 3, 6, and 7 also form a rectangular shape that suggests it too was a plaza. Both plazas would have had Butler Mill Creek (a small stream that once bisected these areas, but whose course was altered in historic times) running through them. Excavations have shown that a clean area between Mounds 2 and 4 was a plaza, but not enough work has been done elsewhere at the site to confirm the larger area implied by the first arrangement, or the existence of a plaza in the second.

The site itself is oriented on an east–west axis, perpendicular to the north–south axis of the Meginnis Arm, a nearby extension of Lake Jackson. All of the mounds are laid out to reflect this alignment, although it is unclear if this is symbolic or merely the result of the lake arm's orientation.

=== Chronology ===
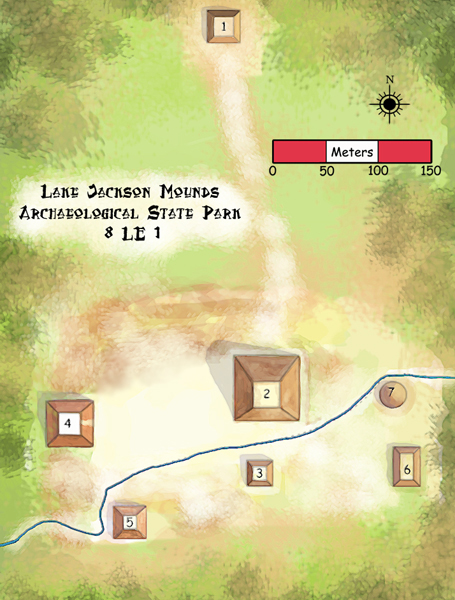
Site plan of the seven mounds; Mound 7 is the low, rounded mound

During the Lake Jackson I phase, the site was small, and Mounds 3, 4, 5, and 6 had not yet been built; Mound 2 may have been started, though that is inferred only from its great size.

Settlement expanded considerably in the Early Lake Jackson II phase. People lived on the ground where Mounds 3 and 4 would later rise and to the northeast of Mound 4, and the area north of Mound 4 and the space between Mounds 2 and 4 held dense midden with postholes, clay floors, and pits. A small occupation continued around Mound 5, which was begun in this subphase, and Mound 2 was almost certainly under way; Mounds 3, 4, and 6 had probably not been started, and no occupation has been found near Mound 6.

By the Late Lake Jackson II phase, work was under way on every platform mound in the main group. Mound 5 was probably complete and Mound 6 was started and perhaps completed, while Mounds 2, 3, and 4 were in use but had not yet received their final stages. Around Mound 4, activity concentrated to the south and west; the space between Mounds 2 and 4 remained inhabited, perhaps less intensively than before; and a thick midden built up north of Mound 2.

In the Lake Jackson III phase, settlement was most intensive in the central part of the site, especially north of Mound 2, where it spread northward. Mounds 4, 5, and 6 were probably finished by the start of the phase, and Mounds 2 and 3 probably reached their final form during it. After about 1500 the site was essentially abandoned. Scattered finds, including a 17th-century glass bead and Spanish majolica sherds, point to occasional, small-scale visits during the succeeding Velda phase (1500–1633).

Archaeologists use changes in ceramic styles to determine timelines for sites and entire regions. The ceramics found at Lake Jackson have been reconstructed into the following sequences using these ceramic markers.

Ceramic chronology of the Lake Jackson site
Site phase	Dates	Ceramic markers
Lake Jackson I	1050–1150	Wakulla Check Stamped, Fort Walton Incised, engraved decoration, and mica inclusions; few of the Mississippian vessel forms, motifs, or appendages of later phases
Early Lake Jackson II	1150–1250	Fort Walton Incised increases; Cool Branch Incised, Marsh Island Incised, and Lake Jackson Incised appear, with red-filmed pottery; Wakulla Check Stamped (in reduced proportions), Carrabelle Punctated var. Meginnis, and cob-marked pottery present; unaltered or folded rims; loop and strap handles; collared jars, carinated bowls, bottles, and beakers
Late Lake Jackson II	1250–1400	Fort Walton Incised, Cool Branch Incised, Marsh Island Incised, Lake Jackson Incised, and red-filmed pottery; rims often notched, ticked, or scalloped; Wakulla Check Stamped, Carrabelle Punctated, and cob-marked pottery absent; strap handles more frequent, and lugs first appear
Lake Jackson III	1400–1500	Fort Walton Incised (except varieties Cayson and Englewood), Lake Jackson Incised, and red-filmed pottery continue, with fluted rims becoming characteristic; Cool Branch Incised, mica inclusions, and carinated bowls no longer present

=== Mounds ===
The forms, sizes, and histories of the seven mounds are summarized below. Mounds 2 and 3 are the only mounds with significant literature and have their own respective sections.

The seven mounds at Lake Jackson
Mound	Form and function	Dimensions	Main construction	Condition and notes
1	Platform mound	Not recorded	Undetermined	The only mound outside the park, standing on private land north of the main group; records of its 1950s excavation are largely lost.
2phase	Truncated-pyramidal platform; probable chief's residence	36 ft (11 m) high; 272 by 312 ft (83 by 95 m) at base	Possibly begun in the Lake Jackson I phase	Largest and best-preserved mound at the site.
3	Truncated-pyramidal platform; mortuary temple	16 ft (5 m) high; 144 by 157 ft (44 by 48 m) at base	c. 1190–1475, in twelve stages	Leveled for fill dirt in 1975–1976 and salvage-excavated; source of the copper-plate burials.
4	Platform mound	Not recorded	1250–1400	Built up from a thin light-colored sandy clay base in basket-loaded stages; possible summit postholes suggest a former structure.
5	Platform mound	Smallest at the site	Begun in the Early Lake Jackson II phase	Built over an earlier village area, without a light-colored sand layer; possibly out of use by the late Lake Jackson II phase.
6	Platform mound	Not recorded	1250–1400 (Late Lake Jackson II)	Raised over an earlier habitation area that had first been covered with light-colored sand; several possible living floors but no burials.
7	Uncertain; possibly a platform mound	Not recorded	Undetermined	A low, rounded mound about which almost nothing is known; its original form cannot be determined.

==== Mound 2 ====
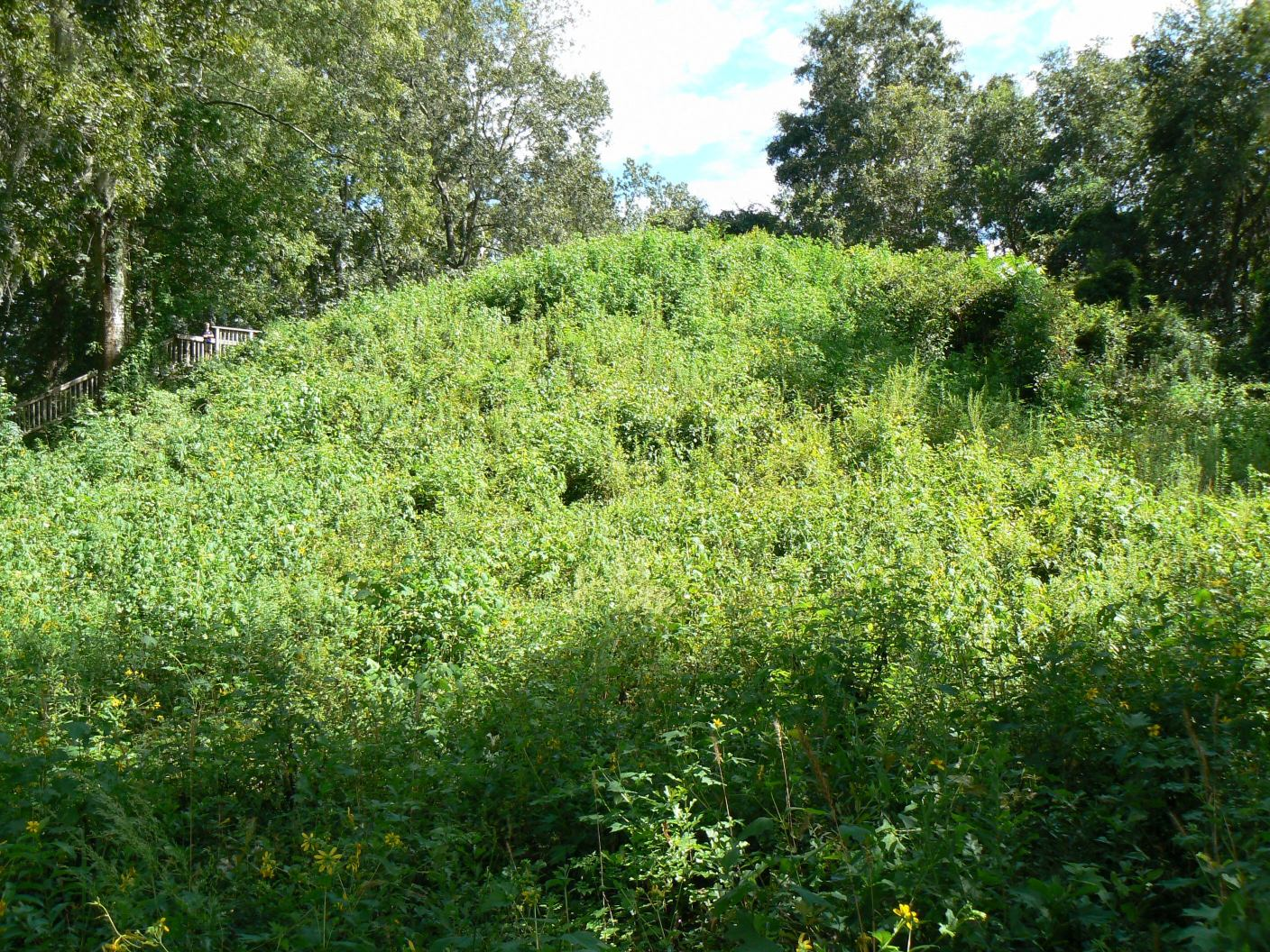
Mound 2 at Lake Jackson Mounds Archaeological State Park

In the center of the complex is Mound 2, the largest and best-preserved mound at the site. It measures 36 ft (11 m) high and 272 by 312 ft (83 by 95 m) at the base. Like all of the mounds at the site where an original shape can be determined, it is a simple truncated-pyramidal platform mound. Very little excavation has taken place at this mound, so not much is known about the construction sequence or what structures may have been built upon it. There was limited work done on the mound in 1947 by John Griffin, in a salvage cleanup effort of a looter's trench. He found a series of fill layers of black muck, various soil types, and caps of red clay, but as the cut was not through the entire mound or located near any structures he could not learn much about its construction sequence or definitive purpose. It was most likely the first mound started at the site, early in the site's history. If it is similar to mounds at other sites, then it was the house platform of the ruler of the site, who was also possibly a paramount chief over many other sites.

==== Mound 3 ====
A photo of Mound 3 taken in 1975 amid its destruction

Located 160 ft (50 m) across a plaza to the south of Mound 2 is Mound 3, the third-largest and third-tallest mound at the site. Mound 3 was used as a mortuary mound by its builders. At the end of its construction, it was 16 ft (5 m) tall, with a base measuring 144 by 157 ft (44 by 48 m). Based on radiocarbon dating done during excavations, the mound is known to have been constructed between 760 years and 475 years Before Present (based on 1950 as present), or approximately between 1190 and 1475. Below ground level of Mound 3, a village midden shows residential occupation at this spot before mound construction began. The first activity other than village occupation was a leveling of the location and a pit dug and filled with 35 stone projectile points and burned organic material. This was covered over with a layer of clay, and a structure erected. This building may have been used for feasting rituals. After a period of time the structure was burned and the first 1.57 ft (48 cm) of mound fill was laid over it. The first burial is included in this layer. The mound was built up in intervals, with new levels being added in stages. Above this, twelve successive floors were separated by episodes of fill made up of lenses of different soils. White sand from the lake shore was used as a first layer in each new episode, followed by mound fill and then a red clay from nearby hills was put on in a thin layer as a final cap. The pattern of deposits of fill demonstrated that the earth was intentionally brought to the site, in baskets as individual basket loads could be detected during excavations.

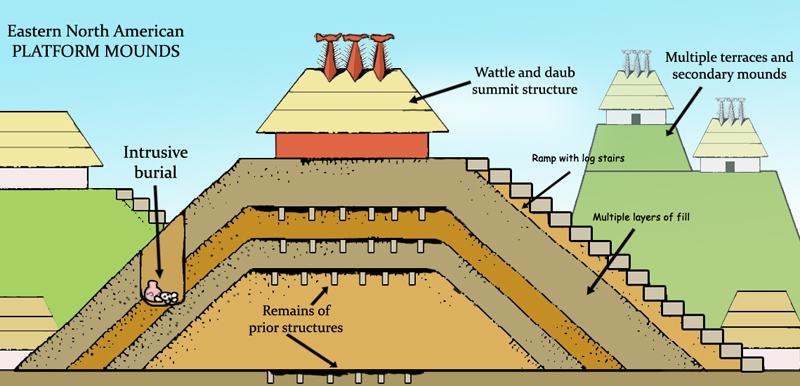
A diagram showing the various components of mound construction

Postholes found on the mound summit indicated that buildings with encircling palisades were erected on the flat top. The last structure erected on the summit measured 24 by 31 ft (7.3 by 9.3 m) and was aligned in a north–south axis just like the mound itself. This rectangular structure is unusual for Apalachee architecture, as most of their structures were round in shape. Archaeologists theorize this may be because of outside influences from other Mississippian centers where rectangular structures are common. The period burning, new fill layer, cap, and structure cycle was repeated twelve times in the 250-year lifespan of the mound. Based on studies at Cahokia (a very large mound center in Illinois) and other Mississippian culture sites, scholars believe that structures were destroyed and the mounds "renewed" with new higher layers of fill and new colored clay caps. The time span in between renewals at many sites suggests the average lifespan of a ruler and their death and replacement by a successor.

Because Mound 3 stood on private land outside the park, it was unprotected, and in the winter of 1975–1976 it was leveled for fill dirt. The salvage excavation carried out ahead of its destruction recovered 24 burials, with others lost in the leveling. Seven of the twelve levels that had been the top of the mound had graves dug into them. Graves dug into the other levels may have been lost as the mound was destroyed. The burials were in deep pits, some lined with split logs, but each grave was kept track of as none were dug down into previous graves. Before burial the bodies were wrapped in cloth and an embossed copper plate placed on their chest. They were then wrapped in leather and cane matting and placed into the prepared pit graves and split logs placed over them. This entire procedure of wrapping the body is reminiscent of "bundling", a practice used for sacred objects which has a long history among Native North Americans. A selection of other grave goods have been found wrapped in the bundles. In the sequence from lower to higher levels (oldest to more recent), the grave goods became more elaborate. In the upper levels, the grave goods included many objects made of copper, beads made of shell and pearl, and pipes associated with ritual use of tobacco. Although most of the burials were of elite men, the graves included one woman (buried with the most elaborate falcon dancer copper plate) and a child of about eleven years of age, probably of the elite class. One of the bodies had been cremated. The bones of a dog were found on top of one of the clay levels that was an earlier top surface of the mound.

=== Artifacts and the Southeastern Ceremonial Complex ===
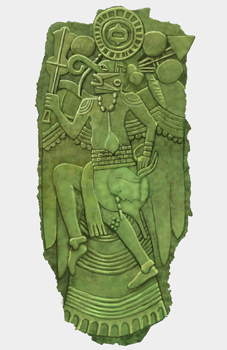
S.E.C.C. falcon dancer copper plate found in Mound 3

Artifacts found at the Lake Jackson site include plain and repoussé copper plates, copper headdress badges, engraved shell gorgets, pearl beads, copper axes, and stone and ceramic pipes. Many of these pieces had motifs representative of the Southeastern Ceremonial Complex or SECC. Similar artifacts have been found at the Spiro site in Oklahoma, the Moundville site in Alabama and Etowah Mounds in northwestern Georgia. Stylistic analysis has shown that of the three, Lake Jackson had the closest ties with Etowah.

The burials found in Mound 3 were ranked into three levels: the elite who were buried with the most-elaborate copper items, pearl beads and shark-teeth-adorned clothing, the middle rank who were interred with stone axes or shell/bead necklaces, and the low-ranked who did not have any high-status grave goods. The iconography of the items also slowly changes with time, growing more complex and numerous and thought by archaeologists to be evidence of influences from other elite polities and the development of a full-fledged local warrior class. At least ten of the burials unearthed at the mound were of "elite war leaders".

The most elaborate embossed copper plate found in Mound 3 greatly resembles the two Rogan plates found in Mound C at the Etowah Site. The three plates are in the Classic Braden style associated with Cahokia, and it is generally thought that the plates were manufactured there before ending up at sites in the Southeast.

The Lake Jackson plate depicts a winged dancing figure holding a ceremonial mace in one hand and a severed head in the other. The figure wears an elaborate headdress with an ogee symbol and a bi-lobed arrow motif. Actual copper ogee plates used as headdress were found in burials at Etowah. These motifs are also found on sculptures and shell engravings from the Spiro site, such as the ogee headdress-wearing "Resting Warrior or Big Boy statue".

The ogee is usually associated with underworld figures. The figure also appears to be wearing a long-nosed god maskette (an object thought to be associated with ritual adoption and also worn as ear-rings by the Resting Warrior) and clothing which are all motifs associated with the falcon dancer/warrior/chunkey player including the columella pendant, large shell beads, bellows apron (scalp motif), and the long-waist sash.

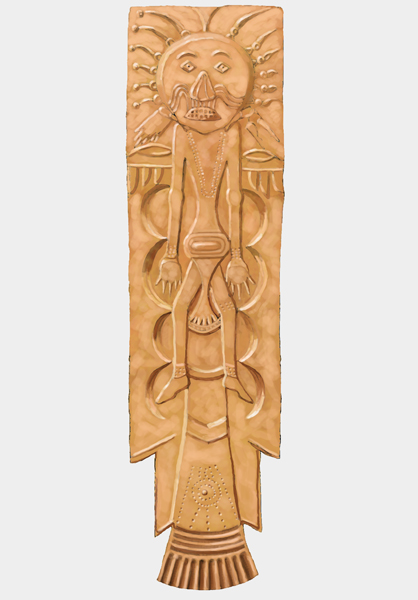
The "Elder Birdman" plate found in Mound 3

This plate was one of 14 recovered from the mound, along with 11 copper axes, many copper headdress ornaments, a few polished-stone celts, marine-shell drinking cups of the type historically used for the black drink ritual, and pottery vessels and a few non-local materials such as mica, graphite pigment, red ocher and stone discoidals. All of the copper pieces came to Lake Jackson by way of the Etowah site, showing that the two sites had a long-running relationship, trading their specific local prestige products to each other.

The Etowahans prized the whelk shells from the Gulf Coast for the making of shell gorgets and ritual drinking cups, and the Lake Jackson elites valued the prestigious Etowah plates and other copper objects. The Etowah shell-trade relationship lasted until the fall of that chiefdom in about AD 1375, after which the elite status goods used in burials in Mound 3 come from other locations, mostly the northern Georgia and eastern Tennessee area. Many of the objects excavated from Mound 3 are exhibited at the Museum of Florida History in Tallahassee.

== Geology and climate ==
Lake Jackson Mounds Archaeological State Park lies at the southern margin of the Tallahassee Hills, a section of Florida's Northern Highlands physiographic province whose ridges are erosional remnants shaped by surface drainage over thousands of years. The park spans a pronounced transition: from bluff crests it descends through a steep ravine system and broad slopes to the flat Lake Jackson Lowlands, one of several shallow lake-filled depressions set among the rolling hills, and on to the shore of Lake Jackson. Elevation ranges from more than 200 ft (61 m) on the uplands to about 90 ft (27 m) at the lake surface.

The oldest bedrock beneath the park is the Suwannee Limestone, which underlies all of Leon County and formed during the Oligocene epoch, roughly 34 to 23 million years ago; porous and permeable, it is the region's principal aquifer. It is overlain by the St. Marks Formation, an early Miocene silty-to-sandy limestone that is almost entirely subsurface, and in turn by the Hawthorn Formation, a later Miocene sequence of sandy, clayey, and phosphoritic sediments.

The park's soils are dominated by the Orangeburg and Plummer series. Orangeburg fine sandy loam mantles the bluffs and ravine slopes across the western two-thirds of the park, on grades of 2 to 12 percent where erosion is a significant risk; it drains rapidly and has a deep water table. The Wagram and Lucy series occupy gentler slopes of 5 to 8 percent, with similar drainage but low natural fertility.

Because the underlying limestone is soluble, the area is prone to karst features, and Lake Jackson occupies a closed karst basin with no permanent surface outlet. On occasion the lake drains through sinkholes into subterranean caverns, its water passing through the Emerald cave system and resurfacing at Wakulla Springs; the lake's Native American name, Okeeheepkee, means "disappearing water." Lake Jackson has emptied at least seven times in recorded history, including after the 1886 Charleston earthquake and, most recently, in September 1999, when it drained into Porter Hole Sink over several weeks and allowed geologists to examine the exposed karst. The basin refills through rainfall, sometimes only after several years.

=== Hydrology ===
Lake Jackson, an Outstanding Florida Water, lies along the park's northeastern boundary. The ravine system is drained by seepage streams that originate at steepheads and feed Butler Mill Creek, which is itself classified as a seepage stream. In the mid-19th century, earthen berms were built to channel these flows through a single point to turn the water wheel of Butler Mill; the berms remain visible along the loop trail. Butler Mill Creek originally ran between the mounds, with three mounds along either bank, but it was rerouted in the mid-20th century toward the lake's Meginnis Arm. In 1995, rainfall from Hurricane Opal drove high flows that deposited sediment across the eastern bottomland forest.

=== Climate ===
Lake Jackson Mounds Archaeological State Park has a humid subtropical climate (Köppen Cfa), with hot, humid summers and mild winters. The nearest long-term weather station, at Tallahassee International Airport approximately 10 miles (16 km) to the south, records roughly 59 in (1,500 mm) of annual precipitation, most of which falls in summer thunderstorms between June and September.

Climate data for Tallahassee International Airport, the nearest weather station (1991–2020 normals, extremes 1892–present)
Month	Jan	Feb	Mar	Apr	May	Jun	Jul	Aug	Sep	Oct	Nov	Dec	Year
Record high °F (°C)	84 (29)	89 (32)	91 (33)	95 (35)	102 (39)	105 (41)	104 (40)	103 (39)	102 (39)	97 (36)	89 (32)	84 (29)	105 (41)
Mean daily maximum °F (°C)	63.9 (17.7)	67.8 (19.9)	74.2 (23.4)	80.2 (26.8)	87.4 (30.8)	90.8 (32.7)	92.1 (33.4)	91.5 (33.1)	88.6 (31.4)	81.7 (27.6)	72.5 (22.5)	65.9 (18.8)	79.7 (26.5)
Daily mean °F (°C)	52.2 (11.2)	55.6 (13.1)	61.4 (16.3)	67.3 (19.6)	75.2 (24.0)	80.8 (27.1)	82.5 (28.1)	82.4 (28.0)	79.1 (26.2)	70.3 (21.3)	60.2 (15.7)	54.4 (12.4)	68.5 (20.3)
Mean daily minimum °F (°C)	40.5 (4.7)	43.5 (6.4)	48.6 (9.2)	54.4 (12.4)	63.0 (17.2)	70.8 (21.6)	73.0 (22.8)	73.2 (22.9)	69.6 (20.9)	58.8 (14.9)	48.0 (8.9)	42.9 (6.1)	57.2 (14.0)
Record low °F (°C)	6 (−14)	−2 (−19)	20 (−7)	29 (−2)	34 (1)	46 (8)	57 (14)	57 (14)	40 (4)	29 (−2)	13 (−11)	10 (−12)	−2 (−19)
Average precipitation inches (mm)	4.41 (112)	4.28 (109)	5.24 (133)	3.53 (90)	3.36 (85)	7.76 (197)	7.14 (181)	7.60 (193)	4.91 (125)	3.24 (82)	3.10 (79)	4.24 (108)	58.81 (1,494)
Average precipitation days (≥ 0.01 in)	8.9	8.1	8.0	6.7	7.5	14.3	16.4	14.8	9.0	5.9	6.3	8.3	114.2
Source: NOAA

== Ecology ==
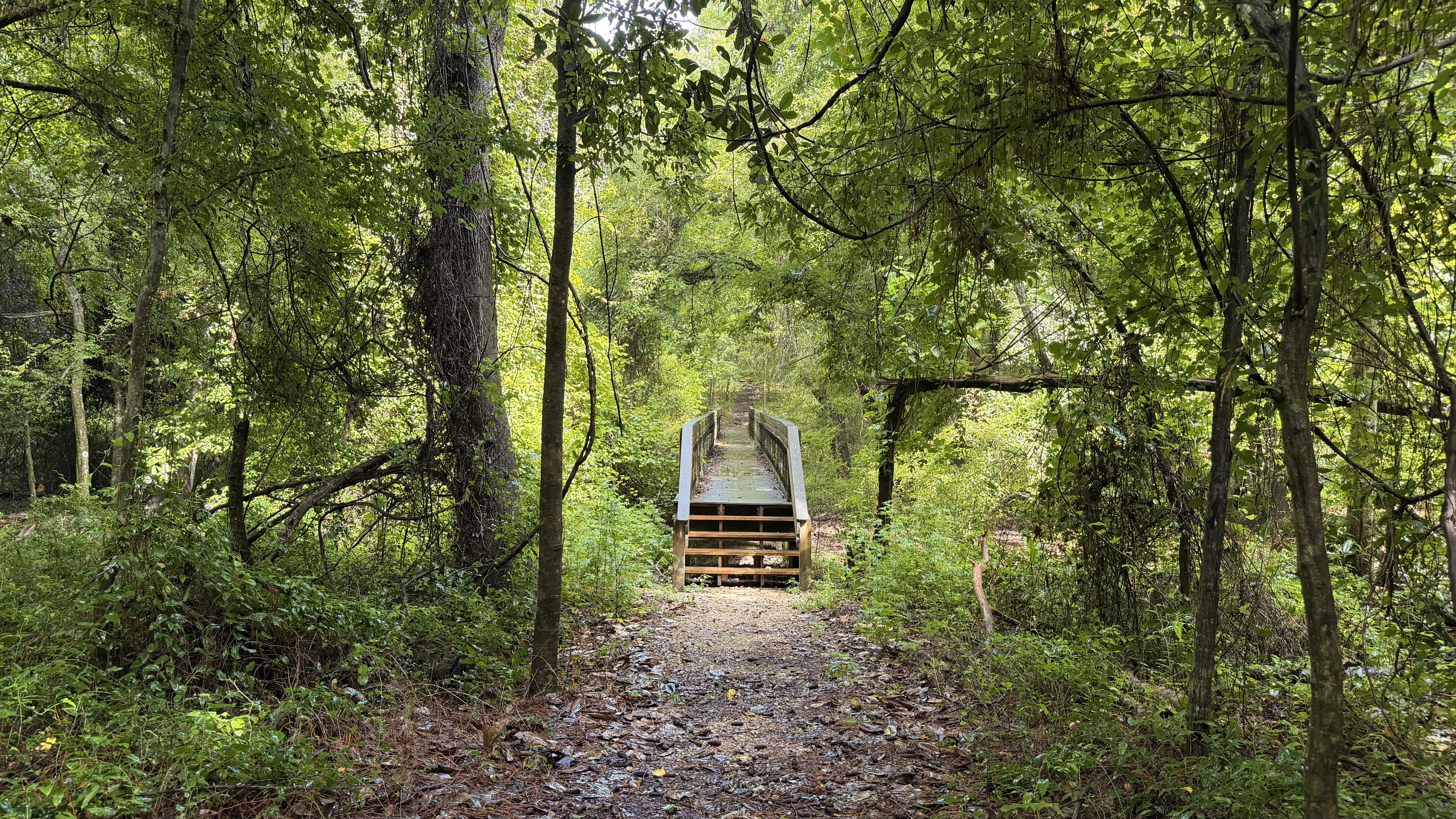
Bridge at Lake Jackson Mounds Archaeological State Park

The land has been shaped by human use and development for more than a millennium, all of the park's wooded areas are in varied states of secondary growth. The Florida Natural Areas Inventory (FNAI) recognizes three natural communities within the park, upland hardwood forest, bottomland forest, and seepage stream, alongside altered land covers such as pine plantation, clearing, and developed areas. Upland hardwood forest is by far the most extensive, covering about 162 acres (66 ha) of the roughly 205 acres (83 ha) park.

The park is a component of the Florida Greenways and Trails System, administered by the Florida Department of Environmental Protection's Office of Greenways and Trails. It also lies within the Florida Wildlife Corridor, the statewide network of connected conservation lands and working landscapes established under the Florida Wildlife Corridor Act of 2021.

=== Flora ===
The upland hardwood forest canopy includes southern magnolia (Magnolia grandiflora), sweetgum (Liquidambar styraciflua), live oak (Quercus virginiana), laurel oak (Quercus laurifolia), Florida maple, white oak (Quercus alba), and swamp chestnut oak (Quercus michauxii), over an understory of American holly (Ilex opaca), flowering dogwood (Cornus florida), eastern redbud (Cercis canadensis), and American beautyberry (Callicarpa americana). On the walls of the ravine system, some hardwoods are more than a century old and grow to great size. A noteworthy component of the ravine groundcover is the spotted wakerobin (Trillium maculatum), which can carpet the slopes with thousands of flowering plants in early spring. Anecdotal accounts have suggested that the state-threatened lanceleaf wakerobin (Trillium lancifolium) also grows in the ravines, but botanical surveys expect that species only in the ravines of Gadsden, Liberty, and Jackson counties.

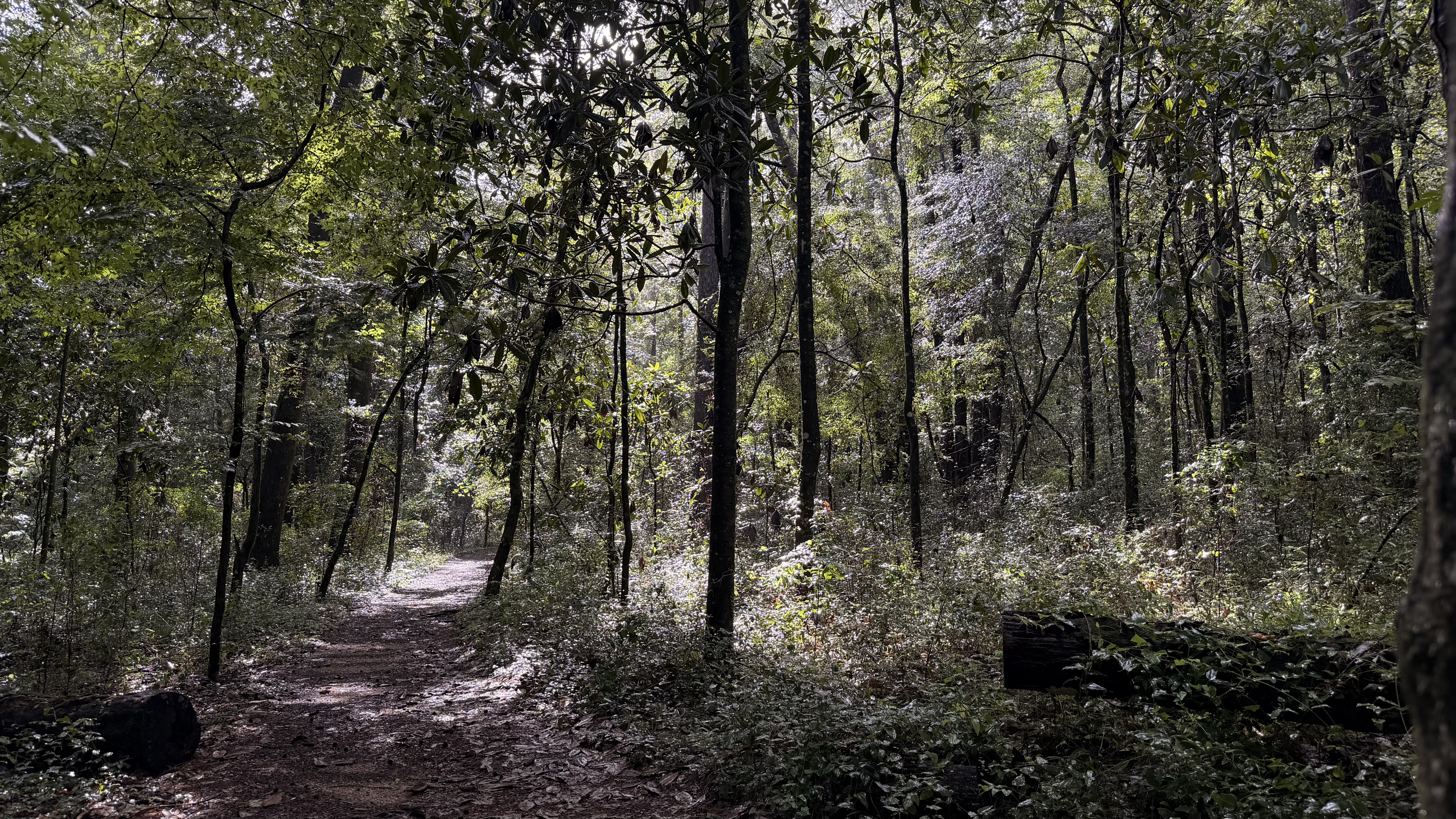
The trail to Butler Mill at Lake Jackson Mounds Archaeological State Park

Areas cleared in the past for pasture, a loblolly pine plantation, or a mobile home park that stood until the 1970s now support earlier successional growth, including laurel oak (Quercus hemisphaerica), water oak (Quercus nigra), loblolly pine (Pinus taeda), black cherry (Prunus serotina), southern red cedar, and yaupon (Ilex vomitoria), with vines such as muscadine (Vitis rotundifolia), crossvine (Bignonia capreolata), Carolina jessamine (Gelsemium sempervirens), and poison ivy (Toxicodendron radicans).

=== Fauna ===
The park adjoins Lake Jackson, which its management plan describes as important local bird habitat, and its birdlife is well documented: about 150 species have been recorded at the park through the eBird citizen-science database. Among the woodland birds recorded are the red-shouldered hawk (Buteo lineatus), Mississippi kite (Ictinia mississippiensis), red-bellied woodpecker (Melanerpes carolinus), great crested flycatcher (Myiarchus crinitus), Carolina wren (Thryothorus ludovicianus), and northern cardinal (Cardinalis cardinalis). State-listed wading birds such as the little blue heron (Egretta caerulea), snowy egret (Egretta thula), and tricolored heron (Egretta tricolor) frequent the lakeshore.

The gopher tortoise (Gopherus polyphemus), a state-threatened reptile, maintains several burrows in the park's uplands and is the focus of its imperiled-species monitoring; managers work to restore open upland habitat for it. Bobcats are seen occasionally, and American alligators, raccoons, and venomous snakes also occur, while the non-native nine-banded armadillo (Dasypus novemcinctus) is removed by park staff when encountered.

=== Invasive species ===
Because the park lies within the Tallahassee metropolitan area, which has the most severe invasive plant infestations in the Florida Park Service's District 1, exotic plants are abundant in many areas. Species recorded include coral ardisia (Ardisia crenata), Chinese privet (Ligustrum sinense), glossy privet (Ligustrum lucidum), Japanese climbing fern (Lygodium japonicum), Chinese wisteria (Wisteria sinensis), air potato (Dioscorea bulbifera), nandina (Nandina domestica), English ivy (Hedera helix), Japanese honeysuckle (Lonicera japonica), and Chinese tallow (Triadica sebifera). Coral ardisia is especially common in the ravines, while the privets and Chinese wisteria dominate near the former mobile home park. Invasive plant control is the park's most significant natural resource management need.

== Recreation ==
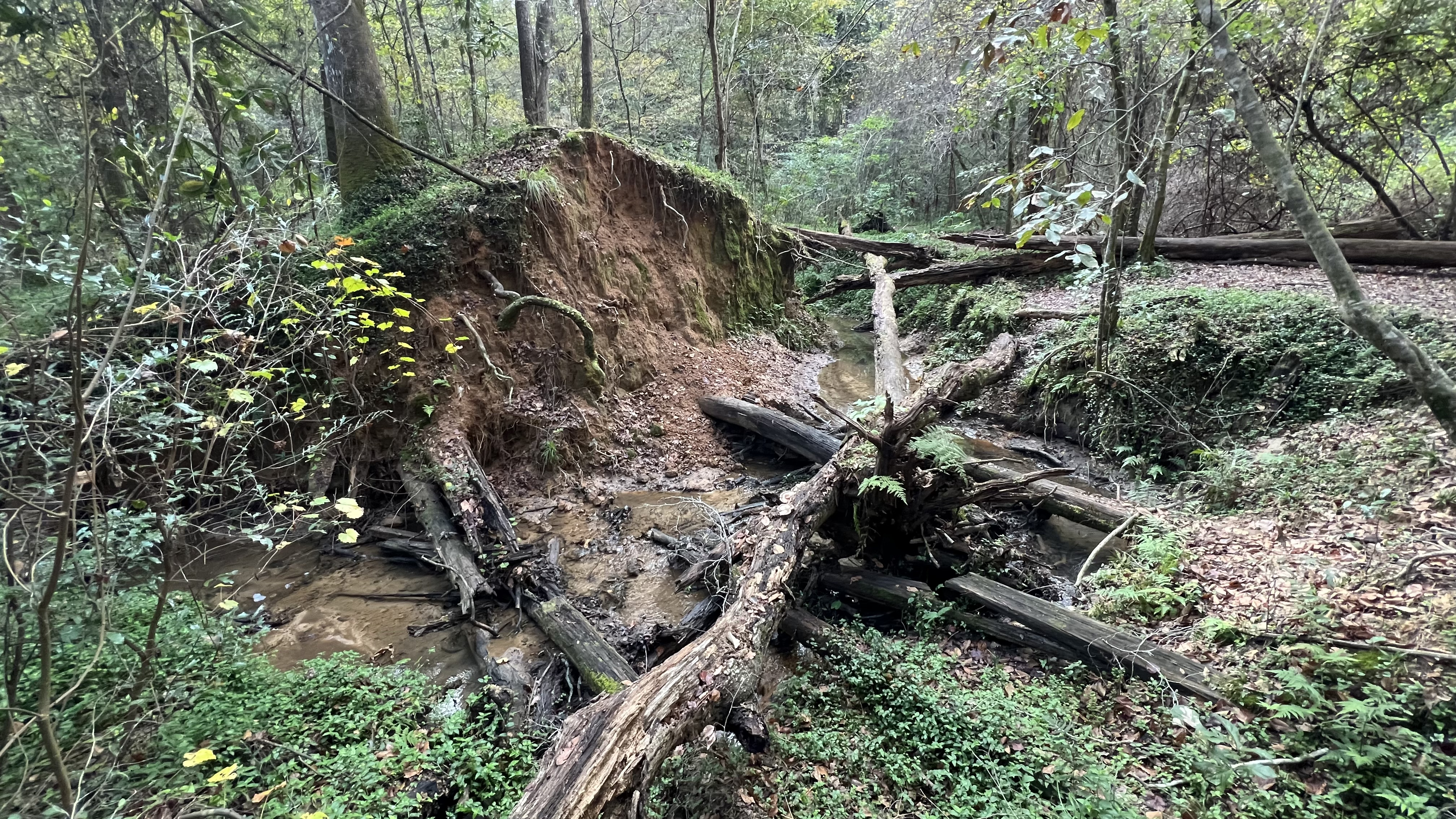
Ruins of Butler Mill at the end of Butler Mill Trail

The park has trails for hiking and wooden tables for picnicking. It is recognized as part of the Native American Heritage Trail administered by the Florida Division of Historical Resources. Two trails are available for hiking: a .75 mi (1.21 km) interpretive trail on the site's 19th-century history that passes the ruins of Butler Mill, and a 2.2 mi (3.5 km) nature trail that winds through the park's native plant communities. The park encompasses six of the seven known mounds, with two of the largest visible to visitors who use the picnic tables. An interpretive exhibit sharing knowledge about the Native Americans who once occupied the site is located in the pavilion with the picnic tables.

=== Visitor information ===
The park is open daily. Activities include birding, hiking, picnicking, and wildlife viewing. Guided tours must be booked two weeks in advance for groups of up to 50. Parking and restroom facilities are available onsite, and pets are allowed on a leash.
