= B. Calvin Jones =

American archaeologist (1938–1998)

- Born: October 31, 1938 (age 87)
- Died: February 15, 1998 (aged 59)
- Known for: Discovering historic sites in Florida

B. Calvin Jones (31 October 1938 – 15 February 1998) was an American archaeologist and discoverer of historic sites in Florida. He is listed as a Great Floridian.

San Miguel de Asile was first discovered and investigated by Jones between 1968 and 1972. Jones concluded that the site was that of San Miguel de Asile. More recent archaeological work and research by Alissa Slade casts doubt on Jones's theory and indicates the site was not San Miguel de Asile, a Timucuan mission, but rather an Apalachee mission, possibly San Lorenzo de Ivitachuco.

Anhaica was rediscovered in 1988 by Jones on the grounds of the Gov. John W. Martin House in Tallahassee.

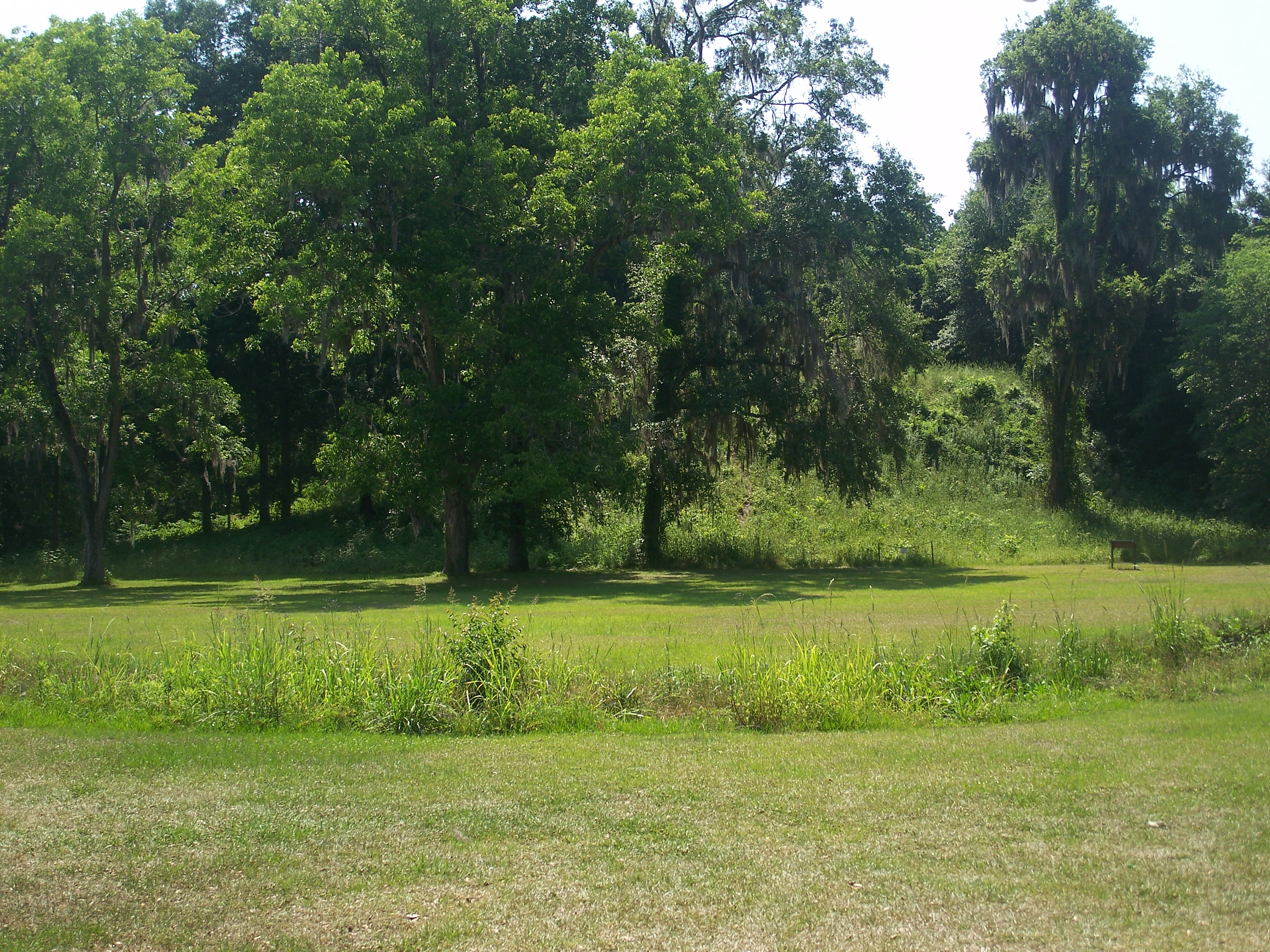
Lake Jackson Mounds Archaeological State Park

Lake Jackson Mounds Archaeological State Park (8LE1) was rediscovered in 1987 by B. Calvin Jones. It is located 7.3 miles north of Tallahassee. After the abandonment of the Lake Jackson site, the chiefdom seat was moved to Anhaica, where in 1539 it was visited by the Hernando de Soto entrada, who knew the residents as the historic Muskogean-speaking Apalachee people. The mounds location on private property outside the state owned park meant it was not protected as the mounds inside the park are and it was leveled for use as fill dirt in the winter of 1975–1976. Before it was dug away by Jones, an archaeologist with the State of Florida Bureau of Historic Sites and Properties, conducted a salvage operation. He recovered 24 burials from Mound 3, with others known to have been lost in the destruction of the mound. Seven of the twelve levels that had been the top of the mound had graves dug into them. Graves dug into the other levels may have been lost as the mound was destroyed. The burials were in deep pits, some lined with split logs, but each grave was kept track of as none were dug down into previous graves. Before burial the bodies were wrapped in cloth and an embossed copper plate placed on their chest. They were then wrapped in leather and cane matting and placed into the prepared pit graves and split logs placed over them. This entire procedure of wrapping the body is reminiscent of "bundling", a practice used for sacred objects which has a long history among Native North Americans. A selection of other grave goods have been found wrapped in the bundles. In the sequence from lower to higher levels (oldest to more recent), the grave goods became more elaborate. In the upper levels, the grave goods included many objects made of copper, beads made of shell and pearl, and pipes associated with ritual use of tobacco. Although most of the burials were of elite men, the graves included one woman (buried with the most elaborate falcon dancer copper plate) and a child of about eleven years of age, probably of the elite class. One of the bodies had been cremated. The bones of a dog were found on top of one of the clay levels that was an earlier top surface of the mound.

A display of B. Calvin Jones Caddo Collection was on display in Longview, Texas at the Gregg County Historical Museum located at 214 N. Fredonia St., Longview, Texas 75601. which has been relocated into the Caddo Nation's custody.
