= San Joseph de Escambe =

Spanish mission in Florida

San Joseph de Escambe was an Apalachee mission community established in 1741 at the present-day community of Molino, Florida along the Escambia River north of Pensacola, lending its name both to the river and later to Escambia County, Florida. Taking its name from an earlier Apalachee mission community named San Cosme y San Damián de Escambe located far to the east in Leon County, Florida, this later Escambe mission was inhabited by refugee Apalachee Indians, including chief Juan Marcos Isfani (also rendered as Juan Marcos Fant), who had previously settled near the mouth of the river in 1718, having gathered a group of Apalachee refugees who had lived among the Creek Indians since the 1704 English-Creek raids that destroyed the Apalachee Province. After twenty years along the northern Spanish frontier, the mission was burned in a Creek Indian raid on April 9, 1761, and its inhabitants resettled with the Yamasee Indian residents of San Antonio de Punta Rasa (also burned that spring) adjacent to modern Pensacola before relocating to Veracruz, Mexico along with the Spanish residents of Pensacola in 1763. The Apalachee and Yamasee were assisted in forming a new town north of Veracruz called San Carlos de Chachalacas along the river of the same name, and this town still exists today, though there is no documentation to demonstrate whether any of the Florida Indians who started the town still have any living descendants there.

The archaeological site of San Joseph de Escambe was located in 2009 by a University of West Florida archaeological field school, and has been the site of several subsequent field schools which have uncovered evidence for the material culture of the Apalachee residents of the site, the Spanish infantry and cavalry soldiers garrisoned there between 1750 and 1761, along with a series of Franciscan friars assigned there.

== See also ==
- Spanish missions in Florida
- Apalachee
