= Anhaica =

Historical settlement of the Apalachee people

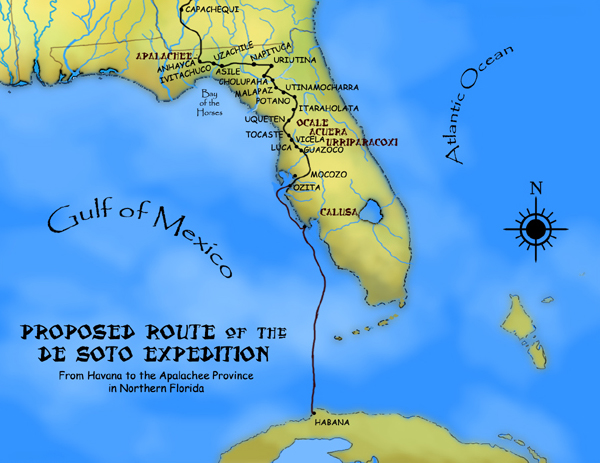
A proposed route for the first leg of the de Soto Expedition, based on Charles M. Hudson map of 1997

Anhaica (also known as Iviahica, Yniahico, and pueblo of Apalache) was the principal town of the Apalachee people, located in what is now Tallahassee, Florida. In the early period of Spanish colonization, it was the capital of the Apalachee Province. The site, now known as Martin Archaeological Site, was rediscovered in 1988.

== History ==
In the late pre-invasion era the site became the capital of the Apalachee after the abandonment of the former capital, the Lake Jackson Mounds Site, in approximately 1500. The fact that no platform mounds are found at Anhaica may indicate a political change. Either Anhaica was not occupied long enough for the construction of mounds to begin, or mounds were no longer being built. Also, disease could have been introduced from the Pánfilo de Narváez expedition through Apalachee in 1528 reducing population, changing village location and/or mound-building activities.

Anhaica had 250 buildings when Hernando de Soto set up camp there on October 6, 1539, forcing the Apalachee to abandon the village. De Soto left the town in March 1540. About 1633, the Franciscan Order's Mission La Purificacion de Tama established a mission at the site of Anhaica.

=== Rediscovery ===
Anhaica was rediscovered in 1988 by Florida State University archaeologist B. Calvin Jones on the grounds of the Gov. John W. Martin House in Tallahassee. Now known as the Martin Archaeological Site (8LE853B), the site has produced examples of early sixteenth-century Spanish coins, olive jars, chain mail, and crossbow quarrels and is considered to have the best claim to be the winter encampment of the de Soto expedition. It is now part of the DeSoto Site Historic State Park.

== See also ==
- Fort Walton culture
- List of sites and peoples visited by the Hernando de Soto Expedition
