= De Soto Winter Encampment Site =

Park in Tallahassee, Florida

DE SOTO WINTER ENCAMPMENT SITE 1539-1540
- Florida Historical Marker #420

- Location within Florida Location within the United States
- Location: Leon County, Florida, US
- Nearest city: Tallahassee, FL
- Coordinates: 30°26′07″N 84°16′08″W
- Area: 5 acres (2.0 ha)

The Hernando de Soto Winter Encampment is an archaeological site located in Tallahassee, Florida. It consists of 5 acres (20,000 m^{2}) of land near Apalachee Parkway, including the residence of former Governor John W. Martin. The site is intended to initiate research and education on nearly four centuries of recorded history beginning with Hernando de Soto's use of the site as a winter encampment in 1539. There is an exhibit of items found at the site in the Governor Martin House.

A 1998 historical marker at the site reads:

In 1539, a Spanish expeditionary force led by Hernando de Soto landed in the Tampa Bay area. Nearly 600 heavily armed adventurers traveled more than 4000 miles from Florida to Mexico intending to explore and control the Southeast of North America. The route of de Soto has always been uncertain, including the location of the village of Anhaica, the first winter encampment. The place was thought to be in the vicinity of present day Tallahassee, but no physical evidence had ever been found. Calvin Jones’ chance discovery of 16th century Spanish artifacts in 1987 settled the argument. Jones, a state archaeologist, led a team of amateurs and professionals in an excavation which recovered more than 40,000 artifacts. The evidence includes links of chain mail armor, copper coins, the iron tip of a crossbow bolt, Spanish olive jar sherds, and glass trade beads. The team also found the jaw bone of a pig. Pigs were not native to the New World and historical documents confirm that the expedition brought swine. These finds provided the physical evidence of the 1539-40 winter encampment, the first confirmed de Soto site in North America. From this location, the de Soto expedition traveled northward and westward making the first European contact with many native societies. Within two centuries, most of the southeastern native cultures were greatly diminished.

Christmas Infographic

This is the site of the First Christmas celebrated in what would be the United States at the Hernando de Soto Winter encampment in 1539.

== See also ==
- Anhaica
- Florida State Parks
