= Apalachee =

Historical Native American tribe from Florida and Georgia, US

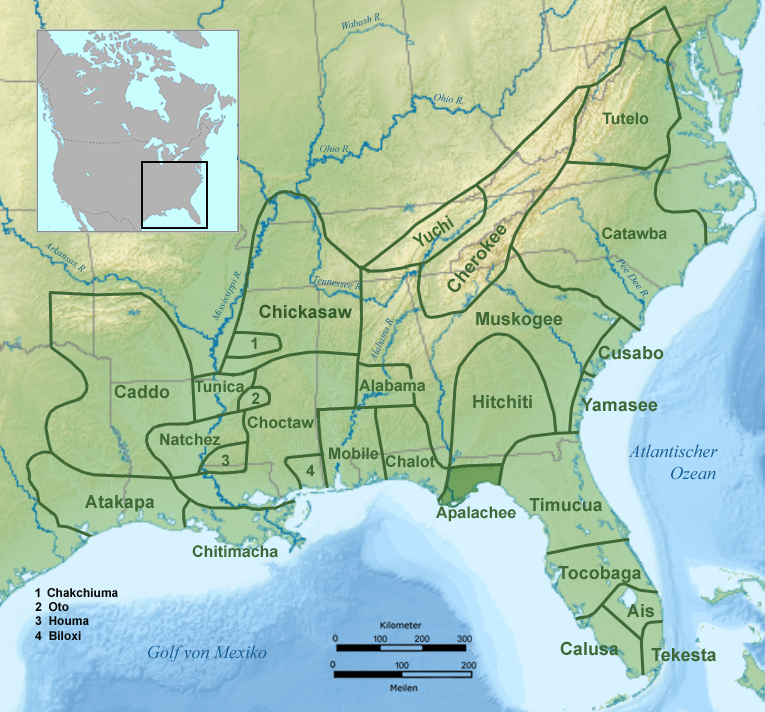
- Apalachee territory in the Florida Panhandle

Total population
- extinct as a tribe

Regions with significant populations
- United States Florida, southwestern Georgia

Languages
- Apalachee

Related ethnic groups
- other Muskogean peoples

The Apalachee were an Indigenous people of the Southeastern Woodlands, specifically an Indigenous people of Florida, who lived in the Florida Panhandle until the early 18th century. They lived between the Aucilla River and Ochlockonee River, at the head of Apalachee Bay, an area known as the Apalachee Province. They spoke a Muskogean language called Apalachee, which is now extinct.

The Apalachee occupied the site of Velda Mound starting about 1450 CE, but they had mostly abandoned it when Spanish started settlements in the 17th century. They first encountered Spanish explorers in 1528, when the Narváez expedition arrived. Their tribal enemies, European diseases, and European encroachment severely reduced their population.

Warfare from 1701 to 1704 devastated the Apalachee, and they abandoned their homelands by 1704, fleeing north to the Carolinas, Georgia, and Alabama.

== Language ==
The Apalachee language was a Muskogean language, about which little more is known. It went extinct in the late 18th century. The only surviving Apalachee document is a 1688 letter written by Apalachee chiefs to the Spanish king. However, it has been partially reconstructed through Spanish mission records and comparative linguistics. It featured a distinct vowel and consonant inventory, which scholars have documented based on 17th-century orthographic conventions. These reconstructions help linguists understand how the Apalachee may have sounded, despite the language now being extinct.

== Name ==
Ethnographer John Reed Swanton wrote that Apalachee may have come from the Hitchiti language term for "people on the other side" or the Choctaw language word apelachi meaning "a helper." It has sometimes been spelled Abalache, Abalachi, or Abolachi.

== Culture ==
The Apalachee are thought to be part of Fort Walton Culture, a Florida culture influenced by the Mississippian culture.

The Apalachee were horticulturalists with stratified chiefdoms and sedentary towns and villages. Like many other Southeastern tribes, they have an alternating dual governmental system with a war chief and a peace chief. Leadership was hereditary and matrilinear. The Apalachee operated under a centralized political structure led by hereditary chiefs, with each town maintaining its own council and ceremonial center. Their society was matrilineal, and leaders often inherited power through the maternal line. Religious life revolved around large temple mounds, where elites conducted rituals tied to agriculture, warfare, and celestial events.

At the time of Hernando de Soto's visit in 1539 and 1540, the Apalachee capital was Anhaica (present-day Tallahassee, Florida). The Apalachee lived in villages of various sizes, or on individual farmsteads of .5 acres (0.20 ha) or so. Smaller settlements might have a single earthwork mound and a few houses. Larger towns (50 to 100 houses) were chiefdoms. They were organized around earthwork mounds built over decades for ceremonial, religious and burial purposes.

Villages and towns were often situated by lakes, as the Native people hunted fish and used the water for domestic needs and transport. The largest Apalachee community was at Lake Jackson, just north of present-day Tallahassee. This regional center had several mounds and 200 or more houses. Some of the surviving mounds are protected in Lake Jackson Mounds Archaeological State Park.

The Apalachee cultivated maize, beans, and squash, as well as amaranth and sunflowers. They also harvested wild plants including persimmons, maypops, acorns, walnuts, hickory nuts, sassafras, yaupon holly, cabbage palm (Sabal palmetto), and saw palmetto (Serenoa). They hunted deer, black bears, rabbits, opossums, squirrels, geese, wild turkeys, and mountain lions.

The Apalachee were part of an expansive trade network that extended from the Gulf Coast to the Great Lakes, and westward to what is now Oklahoma. The Apalachee acquired copper artifacts, sheets of mica, greenstone, and galena from distant locations through this trade. The Apalachee probably paid for such imports with shells, pearls, shark teeth, preserved fish and sea turtle meat, salt, and cassina leaves and twigs (used to make the black drink).

The Apalachee made tools from stone, bone and shell. They made pottery, wove cloth and cured buckskin. They built houses covered with palm leaves or the bark of cypress or poplar trees. They stored food in pits in the ground lined with matting, and smoked or dried food on racks over fires. (When Hernando de Soto seized the Apalachee town of Anhaico in 1539, he found enough stored food to feed his 600 men and 220 horses for five months.)

The Apalachee men wore a deerskin loincloth. The women wore a skirt made of Spanish moss or other plant fibers. The men painted their bodies with red ochre and placed feathers in their hair when they prepared for battle. The men smoked tobacco in ceremonial rituals, including ones for healing.

The Apalachee scalped opponents whom they killed, exhibiting the scalps as signs of warrior ability. Taking a scalp was a means of entering the warrior class, and was celebrated with a scalp dance. The warriors wore headdresses made of bird beaks and animal fur. The village or clan of a slain warrior was expected to avenge his death.

=== Ball game ===
The Apalachee played a ball game, sometimes known as the "Apalachee ball game", described in detail by Spaniards in the 17th century. The fullest description, however, was written as part of a campaign by Father Juan de Paiva, a priest at the mission of San Luis de Talimali, to have the game banned, and some of the practices described may have been exaggerated. The game was embedded in ritual practices that Father Paiva regarded as heathen superstitions. He was also concerned about the effect of community involvement in the games on the welfare of the villages and Spanish missions. In particular, he worried about towns being left defenseless against raiders when inhabitants left for a game, and that fieldwork was being neglected during game season. Other missionaries (and the visiting Bishop of Cuba) had complained about the game, but most of the Spanish (including, initially, Father Pavia) liked it (and, most likely, the associated gambling). At least, they defended it as a custom that should not be disturbed, and that helped keep the Apalachee happy and willing to work in the fields. The Apalachee themselves said that the game was "as ancient as memory", and that they had "no other entertainment ... or relief from ... misery".

No indigenous name for the game has been preserved. The Spanish referred to it as el juego de la pelota, "the ballgame." The game involved kicking a small, hard ball against a single goalpost. The same game was also played by the western Timucua, and was as significant among them as it was among the Apalachee. A related but distinct game was played by the eastern Timucua; René Goulaine de Laudonnière recorded seeing this played by the Saturiwa of what is now Jacksonville, Florida in 1564. Goalposts similar to those used by the Apalachee were also seen in the Coosa chiefdom of present-day in Alabama during the 16th century, suggesting that similar ball games were played across much of the region.

A village would challenge another village to a game, and the two villages would then negotiate a day and place for the match. After the Spanish missions were established, the games usually took place on a Sunday afternoon, from about noon until dark. The two teams kicked a small ball (not much bigger than a musket ball), made by wrapping buckskin around dried mud, trying to hit the goalpost. The single goalpost was triangular, flat, and taller than it was wide, on a long post (Bushnell described it, based on a drawing in a Spanish manuscript, as "like a tall, flat Christmas tree with a long trunk"). There were snail shells, a nest and a stuffed eagle on top of the goalpost. Benches, and sometimes arbors to shade them, were placed at the edges of the field for the two teams. Spectators gambled heavily on the games. As the Apalachee did not normally use money, their bets were made with personal goods.

Each team consisted of 40 to 50 men. The best players were highly prized, and villages gave them houses, planted their fields for them, and overlooked their misdeeds in an effort to keep such players on their teams. Players scored one point if they hit the goalpost with the ball, and two points if the ball landed in the nest. Eleven points won the game. Play was rough. They would try to hide the ball in their mouths; other players would choke them or kick them in the stomach to force the ball out. There were occasional deaths. According to Father Paiva, five games in a row had ended in riots.

The game's origin story was elaborate. Challenging a team to a game, erecting goalposts and players' benches, and other aspects were governed by strict ceremonial protocols. Christian elements became part of the game. Players began asking priests to make the sign of the cross over pileups during a game.

== History ==
The densely populated Apalachee had a complex, highly stratified society of regional chiefdoms. They were one of the Mississippian cultures and part of an expansive trade network reaching to the Great Lakes. Their reputation was such that when tribes in southern Florida first encountered the Pánfilo de Narváez expedition, they said the riches which the Spanish sought could be found in Apalachee country.

The "Appalachian" place name is derived from the Narváez Expedition's encounter in 1528 with the Tocobaga, who spoke of a country named Apalachen far to the north. Several weeks later the expedition entered the territory of Apalachee north of the Aucilla River. Eleven years later the Hernando de Soto expedition reached the main Apalachee town of Anhaica, somewhere in the area of present-day Tallahassee, Florida, probably near Lake Miccosukee. The Spanish subsequently adapted the Native American name as Apalachee and applied it to the coastal region bordering Apalachee Bay, as well as to the tribe which lived in it. Narváez's expedition first entered Apalachee territory on June 15, 1528. "Appalachian" is the fourth-oldest surviving European place name in the United States.

Archaeological evidence shows that the Apalachee region was home to earlier indigenous cultures such as Norwood, Swift Creek, Weeden Island, and Fort Walton, each contributing to the region's ceramic styles, burial traditions, and social organization. These cultures laid the groundwork for later Mississippian-influenced Apalachee society, especially in terms of mound-building and complex settlement systems.

=== Spanish encounters ===
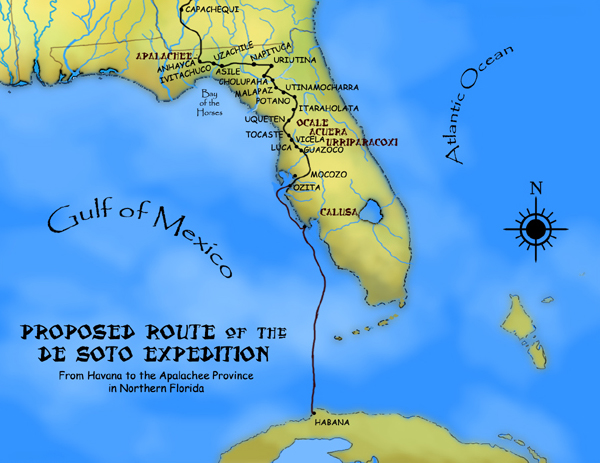
A proposed route for the first leg of the de Soto Expedition, based on Charles M. Hudson map of 1997

Two Spanish expeditions encountered the Apalachee in the first half of the 16th century. The expedition of Pánfilo de Narváez entered the Apalachee domain in 1528, and arrived at a village, which Narváez believed was the main settlement in Apalachee. Apalachee resisted attacks by the Spanish, and the Narváez expedition fled to Apalachee Bay, where they built five boats and attempted to sail to Mexico. Only four men survived their ordeal.

In 1539, Hernando de Soto landed on the west coast of the peninsula of Florida with a large contingent of men and horses to search for gold. The Native Americans told him that gold could be found in "Apalachee." Historians have not determined if the Native people meant the mountains of northern Georgia, an actual source of gold, or valuable copper artifacts which the Apalachee acquired through trade. Either way, de Soto and his men went north to Apalachee territory in pursuit of the precious metal.

Because of their prior experience with the Narváez expedition and reports of fighting between the de Soto expedition and tribes along the way, the Apalachee feared and hated the Spanish. When the de Soto expedition entered the Apalachee domain, the Spanish soldiers were described as "lancing every Indian encountered on both sides of the road." De Soto and his men seized the Apalachee town of Anhaica, where they spent the winter of 1539 and 1540.

Apalachee fought back with quick raiding parties and ambushes. Their arrows could penetrate two layers of chain mail. They targeted Spaniards' horses, which otherwise gave the Spanish an advantage against the unmounted Apalachee. The Apalachee were described as "being more pleased in killing one of these animals than they were in killing four Christians." In the spring of 1540, de Soto and his men left the Apalachee domain and headed north into what is now the state of Georgia.

=== Spanish missions and 18th-century warfare ===
About 1600, the Spanish Franciscan priests founded a successful mission among the Apalachee, adding several settlements over the next century. Apalachee acceptance of the priests may have related to social stresses, as they had lost population to infectious diseases brought by the Europeans. Many Apalachee converted to Catholicism, in the process creating a syncretic fashioning of their traditions and Christianity. In February 1647, the Apalachee revolted against the Spanish near a mission named San Antonio de Bacuqua in present-day Leon County, Florida. The revolt changed the relationship between Spanish authorities and the Apalachee. Following the revolt, Apalachee men were forced to work on public projects in St. Augustine or on Spanish-owned ranches.

San Luis de Talimali, the western capital of Spanish Florida from 1656 to 1704, is a National Historic Landmark in Tallahassee, Florida. The historic site is being operated as a living history museum by the Florida Department of Archeology. Including an Indigenous council house, it re-creates one of the Spanish missions and Apalachee culture, showing the closely related lives of Apalachee and Spanish in these settlements. The historic site received the "Preserve America" Presidential Award in 2006.

In the 1670s, tribes north and west of the Apalachee (including Chiscas, Apalachicolas, Yamasees and other groups within the Muscogee Confederacy) raided Apalachee missions and seized captives. They traded the captives to the British colony of Carolina, where they were sold as slaves to Carolinian colonists. That being said, the Apalachee were not passive victims through this endeavor. Spanish sources document Apalachee individuals fleeing into the interior, forging alliances, and actively resisting capture through negotiation and subversion. Seeing that the Spanish could not fully protect them, some Apalachees joined their enemies. Apalachee reprisal raids, made in part to try to capture English traders, pushed the base camps of the raiders eastward, from which they continued to raid Apalachee missions as well as missions in Timucua Province. Efforts were also made to establish missions along the Apalachicola River to create a buffer zone. In particular, several missions were established among the Chacato tribe. In 1702, the Apalachicolas ambushed nearly 800 Apalachee, Chacato, and Timucuan warriors with a few Spanish soldiers, after several Apalachee and Timucuan missions had been raided. Only 300 warriors escaped the ambush.

When Queen Anne's War (the North American theater of the War of Spanish Succession) started in 1702, England and Spain were officially at war, and raids by English colonists and their Indian allies against the Spanish and the Mission Indians in Florida and southeastern Georgia accelerated. In early 1704, Carolina Militia Colonel James Moore led 50 colonists and 1,000 Apalachicolas and other Creeks in a series of raids on Spanish missions in Florida. Some villages surrendered without a fight, while others were destroyed. Moore returned to Carolina with 1,300 Apalachees who had surrendered and another 1,000 taken as slaves. In mid-1704 another large Creek raid captured more missions and large numbers of Apalachees. In both raids missionaries and Christian Indians were tortured and murdered, sometimes by skinning them alive. These raids became known as the Apalachee massacre. When rumors of a third raid reached the Spanish in San Luis de Talimali, they decided to abandon the province. About 600 Apalachee survivors of Moore's raids were settled near New Windsor, South Carolina. Following the Yamasee War the New Windsor band joined the Lower Creek, and many returned to Florida.

When the Spanish abandoned Apalachee province in 1704, some 800 surviving Indigenous Americans, including Apalachees, Chacatos, and Yamasee, fled west to Pensacola, along with many of the Spanish in the province. Unhappy with conditions in Pensacola, most of the Apalachees moved further west to French-controlled Mobile. They encountered a yellow-fever epidemic in the town and lost more people.

Later, some Apalachees moved on to the Red River in present-day Louisiana, while others returned to the Pensacola area, to a village called Nuestra Señora de la Soledad y San Luís. A few Apalachees from the Pensacola area returned to Apalachee province around 1718, settling near a recently built Spanish fort at St. Marks, Florida. Many Apalachees from the village of Ivitachuco moved to a site called Abosaya near a fortified Spanish ranch in what is today Alachua County, Florida. In late 1705, the remaining missions and ranches in the area were attacked, and Abosaya was under siege for 20 days. The Apalachees of Abosaya moved south of St. Augustine, but most of them were killed in raids within a year.

The Red River band in Louisiana integrated with other Indian groups, and many eventually went west with the Muscogee.

When Florida was transferred to Britain in 1763, several Apalachee families from mission San Joseph de Escambe, then living adjacent to the Spanish presidio of Pensacola in a community consisting of 120 Apalachee and Yamasee Indians, were moved to Veracruz, Mexico. Eighty-seven Indians living near St. Augustine, some of whom may have been descended from Apalachees, were taken to Guanabacoa, Cuba.

In the late 18th century, some remnant Apalachees who had converted to Christianity merged with the Lower Creeks and neighboring tribes into the Seminoles.

== Cultural heritage groups ==
Several organizations claim to represent descendants of the Apalachee people today. None of these are federally recognized tribes or state-recognized tribes. These unrecognized tribes include:

- Talimali Band of Apalachee Indians of Pineville, Louisiana
- Apalachee Indian Tribe of Alexandria, Louisiana
- Apalachee Indians Talimali Band of Stonewall, Louisiana.

== See also ==
- Anhaica
- Evacuation of Spanish Florida (1763)
- Leon-Jefferson culture
- List of Native American peoples in the United States
- List of sites and peoples visited by the Hernando de Soto Expedition
- List of organizations that self-identify as Native American tribes
- Mississippian shatter zone
- Muskogean languages
- Queen Anne's War
