= Francisco de Córcoles y Martínez =

Spanish military officer

32nd Governor of La Florida
- In office April 9, 1706 – July 13, 1716
- Preceded by: José de Zúñiga y la Cerda
- Succeeded by: Pedro de Olivera y Fullana

Personal details
- Born: Unknown
- Died: Unknown
- Profession: Soldier and Administrator

Francisco de Córcoles y Martínez was a Spanish military officer who served as governor of Spanish Florida, an office he occupied from 1706 to 1716.

== Career ==
=== Early years ===
Córcoles y Martínez joined the Spanish Royal Army as a youth, rose from Cadet to the rank of Sergeant-Major, and eventually was appointed a Captain. In 1685, Córcoles y Martínez was sent to the Gulf Coast, where he had an important role in the search by the Spanish for Cavelier de La Salle's colony. Córcoles participated for more than twelve years in the military campaigns of Catalonia, Ceuta, Palermos, Gibraltar and Milan, and was a prisoner of war in France.

=== Governor of Florida ===
Córcoles y Martínez was appointed governor and Captain General of Spanish Florida on April 9, 1706. In 1707, the Spanish settlement at Pensacola was burned when Fort San Carlos de Austria was besieged by a large force of Indians.

As governor of Florida, Córcoles defended the province against several incursions by English raiding parties from the Province of Carolina. In 1706 he furnished six smaller ships, thirty infantry soldiers and fifty Christianized Indian volunteers for a Franco-Spanish expedition to Charles Town led by the French privateer Capt. Jacques Lefebvre. from the Timucua, Apalachee, and Tequesta tribes.

During Córcoles's administration, several joint Creek and English raiding parties invaded Florida. In August 1705, Creek raiders began a twenty-day siege of Abosaya, the new town built by refugees from Ivitachuco. A relief detachment of troops sent by Governor Córcoles from St. Augustine was diverted to fend off an attack by raiders on the St. Johns River crossing at Salamototo. . Córcoles built a defensive line of palisades to protect St. Augustine and bolster the fort's defenses, which protected the inhabitants of the presidio including settlers, his relatives and Christianized Indians. The Treaty of Utrecht of 1713 ended the war with Great Britain, but Córcoles had other troubles. He had faced the second-in-command of the Florida presidio (and later governor) Juan de Ayala y Escobar, because he captured English ships in South Carolina and was selling their cargoes of foodstuffs at a high price to a hungry population. The confrontation occurred at the public square of St. Augustine, with Córcoles y Martínez trying to arrest Ayala, but the whole garrison threatened to mutiny and he not imprison him. (Ayala would who replace him as governor in 1716).

In 1715, Córcoles y Martínez proposed sending two hundred Galician families from Spain to Florida to farm the fertile lands near Apalachee, and supply the garrison at St. Augustine with foodstuffs formerly purchased from New Spain or Cuba; and allowed its long-delayed payroll to be disbursed.

The plan was embraced by all parties concerned, except the Galicians, who rejected the crown's offer of free passage with money, seeds, and farming implements provided. The Galicians protested to the Captain General in Galicia, saying that they would starve whether they stayed in Spain or emigrated to Florida, but that if they were going to starve, they preferred to die in Spain. The plan was not carried out, but between 1757 and 1761, during the administration of Governor Alonso Fernandez de Heredia, over seven hundred Canarians immigrated to Florida to help develop agriculture in the province.

Córcoles y Martínez's term of office as governor of La Florida ended on July 13, 1716; he was replaced by Juan de Ayala y Escobar.
