= Antonio de Benavides =

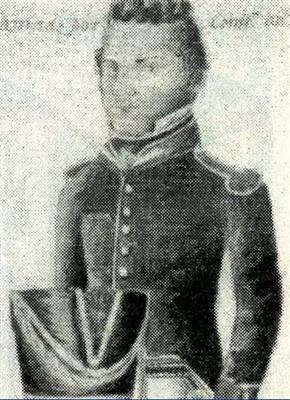

34th Royal Governor of La Florida
- In office 3 August 1718 – 21 May 1734
- Preceded by: Juan de Ayala y Escobar
- Succeeded by: Francisco del Moral y Sánchez

Governor of Veracruz
- In office 1734–1745

Governor of Yucatán
- In office 1745–1750
- Preceded by: Manuel Salcedo
- Succeeded by: Juan José de Clou

Personal details
- Born: 8 December 1678 La Matanza de Acentejo, Tenerife, Canary Islands, Spain
- Died: 9 January 1762 (aged 83) Tenerife, Canary Islands, Spain
- Profession: General and Administrator (governor of Florida, Veracruz and Yucatán)

Antonio Benavides Bazán y Molina (8 December 1678 – 9 January 1762) was a Lieutenant General in the Spanish Army who held administrative positions in the Americas as Royal Governor of Spanish Florida (1718–1734), Governor of Veracruz (1734–1745), Governor and Captain General of Yucatán province (1745 – 1750), as well as Governor of Manila in the Philippines (September 1750 – ?). Before his successive appointments to these various positions, he served with distinction in several campaigns of the War of the Spanish Succession in 1710, and perhaps saved the life of Philip V, the first Bourbon King of Spain, at Guadalajara.

During his term of office in Florida, Benavides jailed Juan de Ayala y Escobar, the previous governor, for dealing in contraband, and repelled several attempts by the English to invade Florida by land and sea. He secured the friendship of the neighboring Indian groups who had previously been inimical to the Spaniards, a state of affairs that continued without interruption while he governed the province. He defended the rights of the indigenous people and established the first black militia unit in Florida to defend St. Augustine, the capital of the province, from British attacks. Over the course of his various administrative appointments, Benavides apparently donated most of his income to the poor people of Florida, Yucatan, Veracruz and Santa Cruz de Tenerife in the Canary Islands.

== Early years ==
Antonio de Benavides was born at La Matanza de Acentejo, Tenerife, in the Canary Islands (part of Spain) on 8 December 1678, into a family of farmers. The son of Andrés Benavides, a captain in the provincial militia, and his wife María, he was the third of 8 siblings. In late 1698 a captain of the Bandera de la Habana (Flag of Havana) stayed at the Benavides family home while touring the island to recruit young men into the Spanish army for service in the New World colonies. According to Bernardo Cólogan Fallón, writer of the first biography of Benavides (1798), the officer saw military potential in the young Benavides, and asked his parents to allow his enlistment as a cadet. In 1699, at age 19, Benavides entered the Spanish army and joined ninety-nine other recruits in a regiment assigned to the garrison of Havana. He spent three years in the Cuban city, where he was promoted to second lieutenant in 1701.

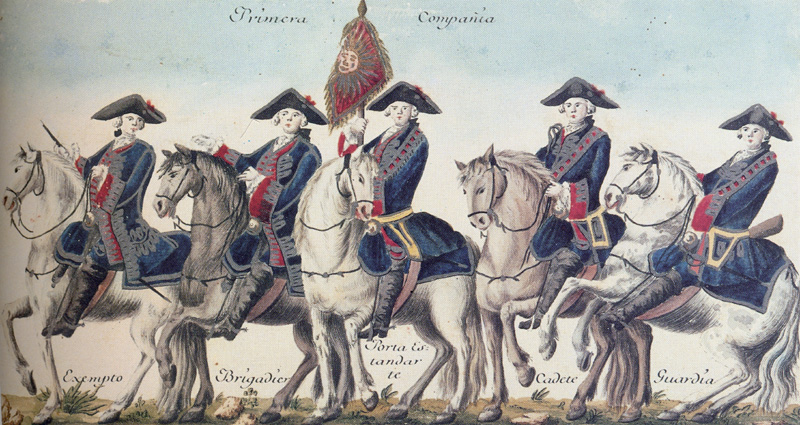
Cavalry of the 1st Company of the Spanish Royal Guard Corps

After the outbreak of the War of the Spanish Succession (1701–1714), Benavides went to Madrid as a member of one of the dragoon infantry regiments sent there as reinforcements for Philip V's troops. When Philip V's advisors told the king of the Canarian soldier who had gained fame as a sharpshooter in Havana, he ordered Benavides to accompany him on one of his hunting trips, after which the two hunted together frequently and became friends. Philip customarily hunted on the grounds of the royal hunting estate, the Casa de Campo, accompanied by the best marksmen in the Royal Guard Corps (Reales Guardias de Corps), which provided his personal security. Due to Benavides' exceptional skill as a marksman and the friendship that had developed between them, the king ordered him to be enrolled in the Corps – an unusual circumstance, since normally only the children of the nobility could join. Benavides was admitted to the second company of the unit, the most elite branch of the Royal Army, and joined the king in numerous other royal hunting parties. He distinguished himself in battle at Flanders and, most famously, at the Battle of Saragossa. He also participated in various actions at Salcedillo, Villareal and Iniesta, as well as the Battle of Balaguer at Barcelona and Tortosa, and Almahara and Peñalba.

== War of the Spanish Succession ==
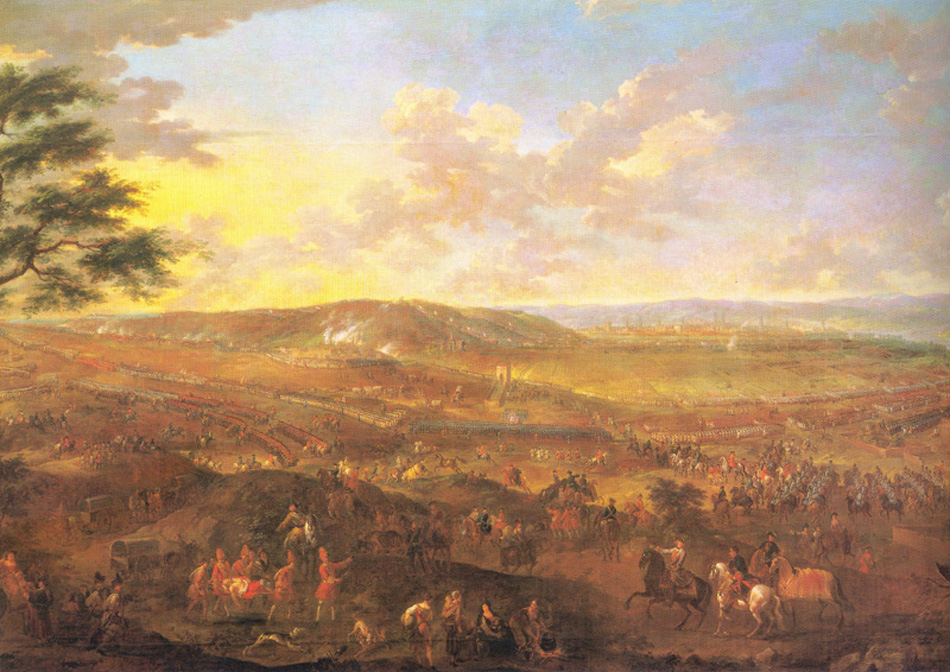
Benavides fought on the Bourbon side in the War of the Spanish Succession. Pictorial representation of the Battle of Saragossa, one of the battles in which he participated

In 1710, Benavides fought in several battles of the War of the Spanish Succession (1701–1714). On 20 August 1710, he commanded a Guards of Corps cavalry squadron of the Bourbon Spanish forces in the Battle of Saragossa, and managed to seize the enemy's artillery in a surprise attack. The Bourbon troops suffered serious casualties, however, and after a disorderly retreat saw that further efforts were futile and conceded defeat.

Benavides possibly saved the life of Philip V, the first Bourbon king of Spain, on 10 September 1710, in the Battle of Villaviciosa at Guadalajara between the Bourbon and Habsburg armies. Seeing that the king was exposed to enemy fire as he sat astride his white horse, and that he did not have a spare horse to escape the perilous situation, Benavides offered to exchange his own horse with Philip, who accepted. A shell knocked Benavides off the royal horse and he lay senseless until the king, noticing that he was missing, ordered that he be sought among the casualties on the field. He was soon found, still unconscious, and treated by Philip V's personal surgeons. To reward his bravery the king promoted Benavides to colonel, and thereafter called him "Father" as a mark of affection and respect. After the signing of the Treaty of Utrecht and the end of the war, Benavides, considered an exemplary cavalry officer by his superiors, was appointed in 1814 to the rank of brigadier of cavalry in the Royal Guard Corps in recognition of his performance on the battlefield.

== Administration in Florida ==
=== Arrival in Florida ===
Philip V, wanting to utilize his services and repay his steadfast loyalty, appointed Benavides governor and captain general of Florida while he was convalescing in Tenerife from his previous injuries. Serious irregularities in local administration were a problem in St. Augustine, the capital of La Florida, and the governorship was considered a difficult assignment in a dangerous frontier. Benavides was sworn into office by the governor of the Canary Islands, rather than before the Royal Council in Madrid, so that he could establish his administration as soon as possible. He embarked from Tenerife in a squadron that included the frigates San Jorge and San Francisco and their escort, the San Javier, which would stop in Havana on the passage to Cuba.

=== Reform and early years as governor (1718–1821) ===
The indefinite borders of Spain's province of La Florida were being challenged by other European powers at the end of the 17th and the beginning of the 18th centuries. Franciscan friars had established several missions in Apalachee Province, one of the four major provinces in the Spanish mission system of Florida. The Apalachee settlers of Mission San Luis de Apalachee, who were skilled agriculturalists, traded agricultural and livestock foodstuffs with Havana merchants throughout the 1600s, and built a thriving community. Meanwhile, the British had founded Charles Town in 1670 in Carolina, on territory the Spanish claimed, and with good reason considered St. Augustine the greatest threat to their security. Carolinian settlers moved southwards, bringing them into conflicts with long-established Spanish colonists. The Carolinian settlers and their Creek Indian allies raided the Franciscan mission settlements of convert Indians repeatedly, and by 1706 their expeditions had destroyed most of the Spanish missions in Florida. Under the previous administration of interim governor Juan de Ayala y Escobar, the territory of La Florida had been attacked frequently by these restive tribes and the British, who continued to harass the Spanish, hoping to hinder their trade and force them to abandon the province. An energetic and active administrator despite his improprieties, Ayala regained the loyalty of many of the Indian leaders who had switched their allegiance to the British.

The Spanish Crown needed a colonial administrator of demonstrated competency to assume the governorship, address these threats and maintain Spanish domination of the region. Benavides, with his distinguished record in the Spanish military and the support of Philip V, was appointed royal military governor of La Florida. While British forces periodically launched incursions into Spanish Florida by land and sea, British traders were constantly expanding their networks of trade with the Indians, and acquiring more influence with the colonial government in Charles Town. When Benavides, a zealous reformer, arrived at St. Augustine in late 1718 to take Ayala's place, he launched an investigation into his predecessor's entrepreneurial activities, and accused Ayala of having engaged in contraband trade with British merchants while still in office. Ayala was arrested, briefly imprisoned in the Castillo and exiled to Havana. The case was not settled until 1731, years after Ayala's death in Havana in 1727.

Benavides familiarized himself with the immediate area by visiting the six Native American settlements around the city, where he was informed of their available resources and present needs. He relied on his colleagues to help implement his policies, having appointed competent persons of his choosing to positions in his administration. In his periodic official reports to the king, he countered complaints from the disaffected and their possibly distorted interpretations of his actions, informing him of the colony's status and explaining what reforms were needed. The king approved his policy and he continued as governor.

=== Relations with the Indians and the French ===
The Spanish had burned and abandoned Mission San Luis de Apalachee in 1704 to prevent the British and their Indian allies from taking it, and did not return to Apalachee until 1718, when Benavides dispatched Captain Joseph Primo de Rivera to build a sturdier wooden fort near the coast at San Marcos de Apalachee, about twenty miles south of the ruined Mission San Luis, for a stronger defense against attackers. Rivera was instructed to erect a structure large enough to house a garrison of one hundred men, a supply storehouse, and a powder magazine.

Benavides wrote the king that by repopulating the country with settler families and dispatching five hundred soldiers to refortify it, Spain might reclaim its lost territory. Events in Europe were affecting those in the Southeast as the European powers maneuvered to assert their claims to colonial lands. France declared war on Spain during the War of the Quadruple Alliance (1718–1720), and on 14 May 1719, Pensacola was captured by Governor Bienville of French Louisiana, with a fleet of ships and a force of Indian warriors that met only token resistance from the Spanish. The French occupied Pensacola until August 1719, when a large Spanish force arrived and compelled the small French garrison to surrender. This Spanish occupation lasted until 1 September, when a French fleet arrived to reassert French control. The Spanish soldiers garrisoned at the rebuilt blockhouse in Apalachee were ordered to St. Augustine, leaving the natives who had settled nearby to their own devices. In 1722, Pensacola was officially returned to Spanish control, though the French garrison did not withdraw until 1726.

In 1719, Governor Benavides began the construction of a second line of defenses in St. Augustine, completed in 1721: the Cubo Line on the north, joining the Rosario line on the west and the south, facing the San Sebastián River.

=== Subsequent years governing Florida (1721–1734) ===
In 1721, Benavides began an investigation into the historical background for Spanish claims to the coast of what is now the state of Georgia. In 1724, he asked the Spanish Crown to send the situado, or annual subsidy, to Florida by land rather than by sea, believing that a land route between New Spain and Florida would eliminate delays caused by the shortage of ships in Veracruz. He also proposed the creation of a line of presidios along the Gulf Coast from Veracruz to Apalachee to protect the overland route, and eventually allow the development of a profitable coastal trade. The council, however, paid little attention to this proposal.

Perhaps fearing the possibility of reprisal, in 1725 Benavides sent a delegation to Charles Town with an offer to purchase 10 fugitive slaves who had fled to St. Augustine, for 200 pesos apiece. This was angrily rejected by the Carolinian slave owners, who asserted their property was worth much more, and demanded compensation for loss of the slaves' labor.

In 1726, Benavides' term of office was temporarily interrupted when he went to Havana to be operated on for appendicitis; Ignacio Rodriguez Rozo served as interim governor in his place. After his return to Florida that year, Benavides formed a militia of black slaves to defend Saint Augustine against foreign incursions, and appointed Mandinga-born Francisco Menéndez, a runaway black slave from South Carolina, its captain. Menéndez had joined the Yamasee Indians in fighting European colonists in the Yamasee War of 1715–1717, and escaped to St. Augustine in 1724. Benavides ignored the 1693 decree by King Charles II officially emancipating the slaves who fled Carolina, maintaining that it applied only to those who had arrived in Florida while the war was still under way. Nevertheless, runaway slaves from the Carolinas continued to seek refuge in Florida, knowing they had more rights under the Spanish system of slavery. Benavides went so far as to offer 30 silver pieces of eight for an Englishman's scalp and 100 pieces for "every live Negro” brought to St. Augustine. In 1727, Spanish raiders commanded by Francisco Menéndez and runaway slaves from Carolina destroyed a plantation on the Edisto River and carried away seven black slaves.

Benavides continued to flout the 1693 decree, and declined to free the runaways, including Menéndez, despite his demonstrated loyalty to the Spanish Crown. Benavides even sold the militiaman with nine other fugitives at public auction in 1729. Four years later, in 1733, the Spanish government in Madrid banned the sale of runaway slaves and freed all black soldiers after four years of service to the crown; consequently Benavides decreed that runaways who converted to Catholicism and worked in the presidio of St. Augustine for four years as state slaves would be emancipated.

Also in 1733, Benavides proposed sending the runaways to Carolina to incite a rebellion, again intending to "pay them for English scalps", but the Council of the Indies declined to approve this action. Francisco Menéndez and several other slaves finally won unconditional freedom in 1738 by a decree of the new governor of Florida, Manuel de Montiano. Over the course of his lengthy term as royal governor of Florida, Benavides succeeded in fending off British incursions and repressing piracy in Florida waters. Before he left the province, the king promoted him to the rank of Field Marshal for his able execution of the duties of his office, and as a parting gesture, he donated his belongings to the needy citizens of Florida.

== Governor of Veracruz ==
On 27 March 1733, the king appointed Benavides governor of the province of Veracruz and the Castle of San Juan de Ulúa, Mexico. The Floridanos were generally dismayed when the news reached Florida, as they did not expect to see another governor like Benavides. He continued the same policies he had implemented there at his new post, and practiced his accustomed charity, devoting much of his income to the poor people of Veracruz, just as he had done in St. Augustine.

Benavides took a great interest in works on the defenses of the presidio and the fortress of Veracruz. In five months he expanded them as a screen for the artillery positions, built a large cistern and provisioned it with food for six months, while the number of men in the garrison was greatly increased. Nevertheless, he rejected a project conceived in Madrid to construct a battery flush with the waters surrounding the Isla de Sacrificios.

After many years of service to the crown, Benavides began to feel that he should leave governance, and desiring not to harm the interests of the colony, asked to be released from office, but Ferdinand VI refused. In 1745, he requested that the Crown create the new position of Teniente de Rey (King's Lieutenant) in Campeche, in the Captaincy General of Yucatán, to ensure a continuous military command in the main port of the province, which was a target of frequent attacks by British privateers and buccaneers who roamed the seas off its coast. Having someone occupy this position would ensure an automatic succession to the office of Governor and Captain General of Yucatán, until a final appointment could be made by the king or the viceroy. This decision was popular among the citizens of Campeche, but not with those of Mérida, whose alcalde in the city council had previously held the status of presumptive replacement of governors who vacated their office. The king welcomed this idea and appointed Romualdo de Herrera the first King's Lieutenant of Yucatán.

== Governor of Yucatan ==
Benavides was appointed to the Captaincy General of Yucatán when war with England flared up again. Having acquired the rank of Lieutenant General of the Royal Armies, he commanded an expedition formed to defend the coast of Tabasco and Honduras in the War of Jenkins' Ear (1739–48). He led a small army of regulars, reinforced by the peasant militia, with orders to defend the coasts of Honduras and Tabasco, and to protect the ports chosen to supply the ships of the Royal Spanish Navy. The dispute was eventually settled by the Treaty of Aix-la-Chapelle, part of the wider settlement of the War of the Austrian Succession. With the Spanish implementation of the treaty, Benavides continued his efforts to repel the pirates and privateers preying on Spanish ships.

Governor Benavides made a proposal to the Spanish Crown for the creation of a fund to compensate the poorly paid military personnel garrisoned in Campeche, to be financed with the income of the vacant encomiendas. This caused great consternation among the "encomenderos" of the province, who saw it as jeopardizing their income and prerogatives in favor of the militia; they believed the governor had betrayed the interests of the wealthy families who enjoyed the privileges of the encomiendas. The political backlash was such that Benavides was forced to withdraw the application. He also withdrew a third initiative he had submitted for the creation of a state monopoly of salt production in the region. The adverse reaction was much more widespread in this case, since the project would damage the interests of all the people, given that salt was a staple whose availability and price affected everyone.

Seeing a decrease in their exports to Spanish America caused by the growing popularity of aguardiente de cana, a brandy made locally from sugar cane, the large Spanish purveyors of spirits complained to the crown, and sought royal protection for their interests. In 1748, a royal cedula (decree) was issued instructing provincial governors to prohibit the production and consumption of aguardiente. The same year Benavides came into conflict with the council of Campeche over his use of Indian labor to work in rice paddies, and for the cutting of logwood trees (from the heartwood of which a valuable fabric dye was extracted) and other timber trees. Antonio Benavides' term in Yucatan ended in 1750 when he was appointed governor of Manila in the Philippines in September of that year.

== Last years ==
In 1750 Benavides sailed from the port of Sisal, Yucatan to Veracruz. From there, he departed for Acapulco and onward to the Philippines. When he finally returned to Tenerife at the age of 70, he rejected Philip VI's appointment as captain general of the Canary Islands, pleading the infirmities of old age. He donated money to expand and renovate the Nuestra Señora de Los Desamparados hospital in Santa Cruz de Tenerife for the benefit of the poor, retired there himself in January 1761, and died on 9 January 1762. Today his remains lie in the "Parroquia de la Conception".

== Personal life ==
Benavides never married. While living in the Americas, he bought an African slave, Antonio Quijada, who returned with him to the Canary islands and served the old man until his death.

== Legacy ==
- On 9 January 2012, the city council of Tenerife, Benavides' birthplace, paid tribute to its native son to coincide with the 250th anniversary of his death. A wreath was laid at his newly restored headstone in the Church of the Conception (Iglesia de la Concepción) at Santa Cruz de Tenerife (where he was buried according to his wishes), and a eulogy was delivered by Emilio Abad Ripoll, president of the Tertulia Amigos (Friends of the Salon). Ricardo Melchior, president of the council, and Cristobal de la Rosa, the island's director of Cultural and Historical Heritage, attended as well. The headstone's inscription, which has remained intact for over 250 years, reads: Aquí yace el Excmo. Sr. D. Antonio Benavides, teniente general de los Reales Ejércitos, natural de esta isla de Tenerife. Varón de tanta virtud, cuanto cabe por arte y naturaleza en la condición mortal ("Here lies the Honorable Antonio Benavides, Lieutenant General of the Royal Armies, a native of the island of Tenerife. A man of such virtue, as should be for art and nature in the mortal condition").
- The novel La cruz de plata, which is based on the adventures of Antonio de Benavides, was published by novelist Jesús Villanueva Jiménez in 2015.
