= French ship Brillant =

Nine ships of the French Navy have borne the name Brillant:

- Brillant (1680) a 50-gun ship of the line (1670)
- Brillant (1672) a 40-gun ship of the line (1672)
- Brillant (1678) a 56-gun ship of the line (1678), originally built 1671 as Furieux
- Brillant (1690) a 64-gun ship of the line (1690)
- Brillant (1725) a 56-gun ship of the line (1725)
- Brillant (1758) a 64-gun ship of the line (1758)
- Brillant (1774) a 64-gun ship of the line (1774)
- Brillant (1794) a small captured English lugger (1794)
- Brillant (1815) an 82-gun ship of the line captured by Great Britain in 1814 while still under construction
