= Cubo Line =

Defense system that protected St. Augustine, Florida

Coordinates: 29.8978°N 81.3136°W

- Linea Cubo
- St. Augustine, Florida
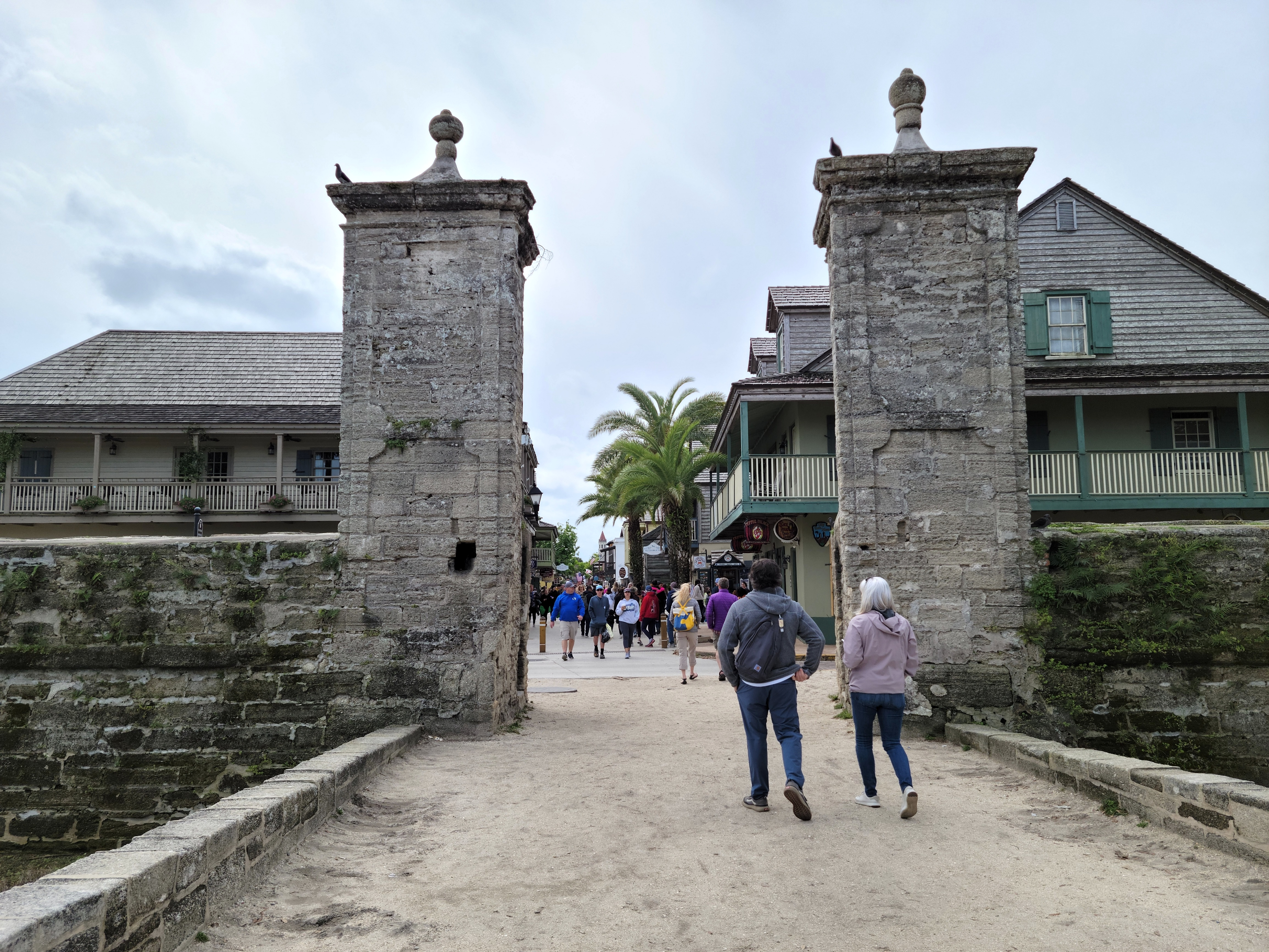
- City gates in the Cubo Line

Site information
- Type: Defensive line
- Open to the public: Yes
- Condition: Most of the organic material-built line was destroyed since a British siege in 1740; rebuild gates and minimum sections in 1763 with coquina

Location
- Height: 6 feet (1.8 m)

Site history
- Built: 1702–1716
- In use: 1704–1821
- Materials: Earth, palmetto logs, coquina rock
- Battles/wars: Siege of St. Augustine (1740); Patriot War of East Florida (1812)

The Cubo Line was part of the defense system built by the Spanish to protect the presidio of St. Augustine (San Agustín) in the territory of Spanish Florida (La Florida) during the early years of the 18th century.

== History ==
After the 1702 siege of St. Augustine and its burning to the ground by troops under the command of James Moore, governor of Carolina, the Spanish determined to improve the defenses of St. Augustine outside the confines of their massive masonry fortress, the Castillo de San Marcos. Because the English had entered the city by way of the peninsula on which the town sat, in 1704 Governor José de Zúñiga ordered the building of a defensive system around the exposed sides of the town to prevent another invasion by land. By 1705, the Cubo Line consisted of an earth defensive wall covered with sharp-leaved yucca surrounding a nine-foot-high palm log stockade that stretched about half a mile from the Castillo to the San Sebastian River. This defensive line, with six small redoubts, demarcated the northern limits of St. Augustine from the northwest bastion westward to the San Sebastian River. An approximately 40-foot wide moat ran parallel to the line, with a small drawbridge spanning it at the town's main gate.

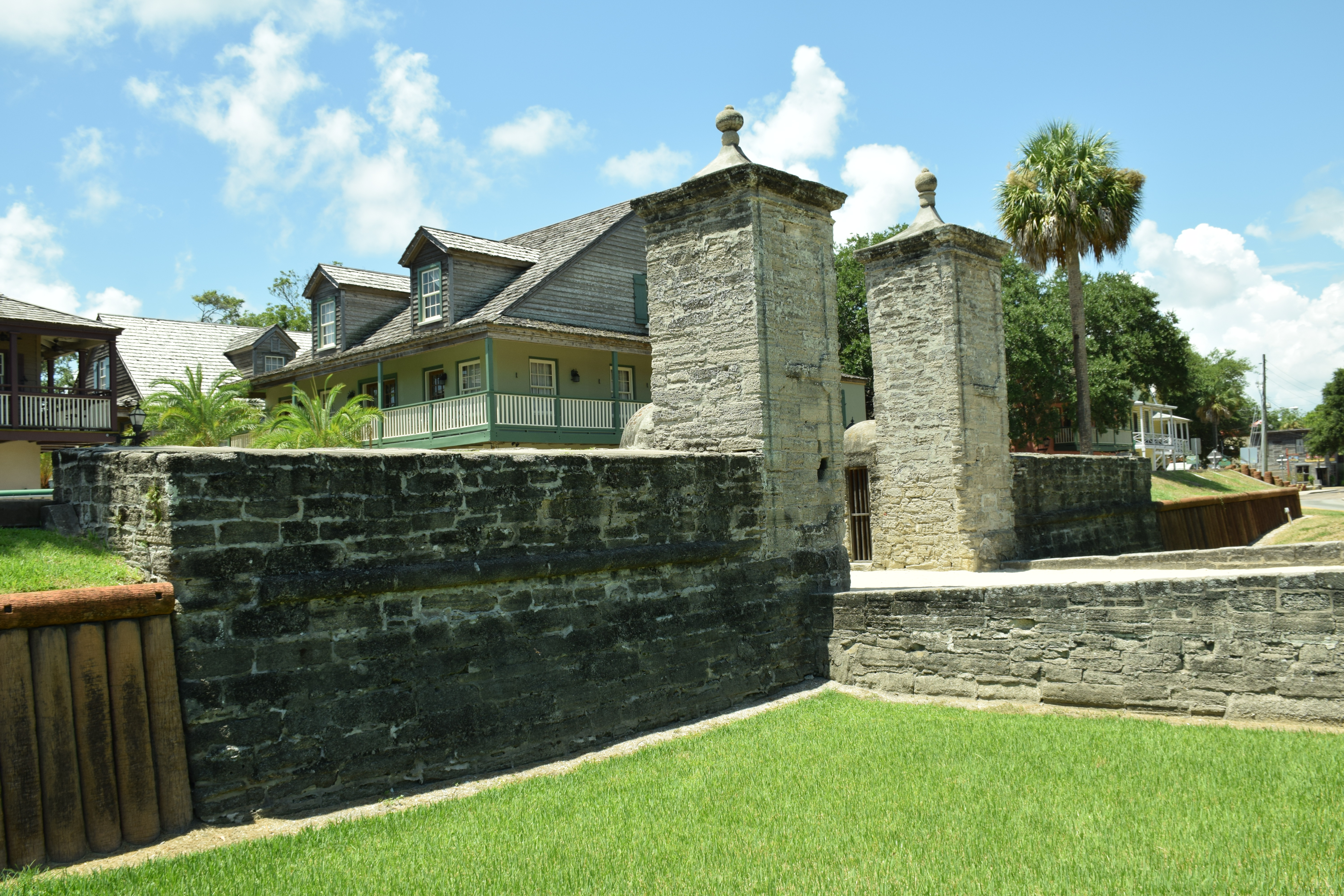
Side view of city gates

In 1706 work commenced on another wall about a half mile north of the Cubo Line, called the Hornabeque Line (or Hornwork Line) for its "Horns", or demi-bastions, that protruded like the horns of a bull at both ends. An additional defensive wall, the Rosario Line, was built in 1718 running south from the Santo Domingo Redoubt for almost a mile then turning east to Matanzas Bay. These inner defensive walls prevented Gen. James Oglethorpe, the governor of the English colony of Georgia, from occupying or razing St. Augustine during his siege of 1740. The Mose Line, St. Augustine's outermost defense earthwork, running three quarters of a mile southwest from Fort Mose, was not constructed until 1762, one year before the Spanish evacuated St. Augustine after its transfer to the British by the terms of the Treaty of Paris in 1763. All the defensive lines measured half a mile or more in length, each of them associated with a fort: the Cubo and Rosario Lines with the Castillo de San Marcos; the Hornabeque Line with Fort Nombre de Dios; and the Mose Line with Fort Mose.

In its first reconstruction (1718–1719), the Cubo Line became an earthwork with three artillery redoubts, the Santo Domingo, the Medio Cubio, and the Cubo. In 1808, the Cubo line was again reconstructed and two masonry (coquina) pillars were built to support the wooden gate doors. In 1820, the newly appointed royal engineer, Ramón de la Cruz, proposed improvements to the Cubo line that were implemented by June 1821, when Spain officially ceded Florida to the United States, fulfilling the terms of the Adams–Onís Treaty signed in 1819. In his submitted description of its condition at the time, de la Cruz refers to the Cubo redoubt and the Middle and Tolomato redoubts (previously known as the Medio and Santo Domingo redoubts).

It serves as the start of St. George Street.
