= Robert Seabrook =

South Carolina planter, politician, and soldier during Queen Anne's War

Captain Robert Seabrook
- Seabrook family Coat of Arms

Speaker of the South Carolina House
- In office 1705–1706

Church Acts Commissioner
- In office 1704–1706

Member of the Commons House of Assembly, Province of Carolina
- In office 1702–1704

High Sheriff of Colleton County
- In office 1695–1696

Personal details
- Born: 1651 Dunstable, Bedfordshire, Commonwealth of England
- Died: 7 December 1710 (aged 58–59) Colleton County, Province of Carolina
- Spouse: Sarah Collins
- Children: 7, including Joseph Seabrook
- Occupation: Settler; Politician; Colonist; Planter; Military Officer

Military service
- Allegiance: Kingdom of England; Province of South Carolina
- Branch/service: South Carolina Militia
- Rank: Captain
- Commands: Colleton County Militia
- Battles/wars: Queen Anne's War; Defense of Charles Town

Captain Robert Seabrook was an English American politician, settler, explorer, militia officer, and planter, who helped defend Charles Town in 1706. He also played several roles in South Carolina local government including Speaker of the House and High Sheriff. He immigrated from England around 1680, settling on Seabrook Island, which is named after him.

== Early life & Family ==
Robert Seabrook was born to Robert Seabrook (1625–1682) and Alice Goodspeed (1635–1690). He married his wife Sarah Collins in 1673 and they had 7 children together. He moved his family to South Carolina from England around 1680, establishing a plantation on what is now Seabrook Island.

== Political career ==
Seabrook first held office as High Sheriff in Colleton County from 1695 to 1696. He later served as a Member of the Commons House of Assembly from 1702 to 1704. He also oversaw the colonies implementation of the Church Act as commissioner from 1704 to 1706. His final role in government was as Speaker of the House in the Province of South Carolina from 1705 to 1706. It was during the later part of his term as speaker that he was called upon to lead a large company of militia to aid Charles Town from French and Spanish attack. Assembly records of the province of Carolina (late 17th / early 18th c.) — for mentions of Seabrook as a Member of Assembly and Speaker

== Military Service ==
When Charles Town was attacked as a part of Queen Anne's War in 1706, Seabrook gathered every able bodied man from Colleton County and marched them to the city to help fight back the French and Spanish attackers. When his force arrived the city was in dire peril. The cities garrison numbered only a few hundred initially so the reinforcements to William Rhett were much needed in order to achieve victory. The timely mobilization of Seabrook's men and other like them from neighboring areas proved crucial in the battle and allowed the city to repel the attack.

== Later life & Legacy ==
Tombstone of Capt. Robert Seabrook

He lived out the remainder of his days on his plantation on Seabrook Island and died in 1710 at age 59. His 7 children gave him many grandchildren and today, his descendants number in the tens of thousands including Joseph Seabrook, Whitemarsh Benjamin Seabrook, William Seabrook, John Jarvis Seabrook, and Georgette Seabrooke.
