= Seabrook Island, South Carolina =

- Town
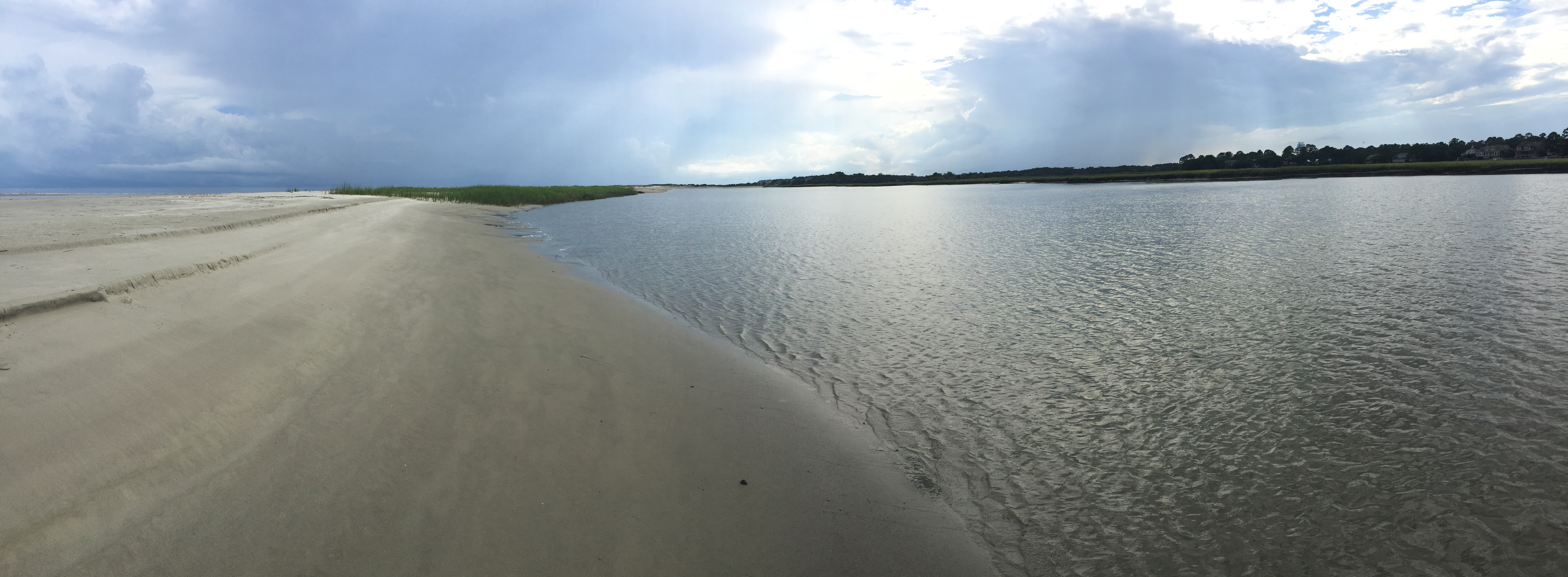

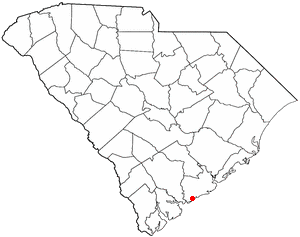
- Location of Seabrook Island in South Carolina
- Coordinates: 32°34′56″N 80°9′48″W
- Country: United States
- State: South Carolina
- County: Charleston
- Established: 1987

Government
  - Type: Mayor-Council

Area
  - Total: 7.06 sq mi (18.29 km^{2})
  - Land: 5.94 sq mi (15.38 km^{2})
  - Water: 1.12 sq mi (2.91 km^{2})
- Elevation: 0 ft (0 m)

Population (2020)
  - Total: 2,050
  - Density: 345/sq mi (133.3/km^{2})
- Time zone: UTC-5 (EST)
  - Summer (DST): UTC-4 (EDT)
- ZIP code: 29455
- Area codes: 843, 854
- FIPS code: 45-64712
- GNIS feature ID: 2407303
- Website: www.townofseabrookisland.org

Seabrook Island, formerly known as Simmons Island, is a barrier island in Charleston County, South Carolina, United States. As of the 2020 census, Seabrook Island had a population of 2,050.

Seabrook Island is part of the Charleston-North Charleston-Summerville metropolitan area.

== Geography ==
Seabrook Island is located in southwestern Charleston County and is bordered to the south by the Atlantic Ocean, to the west by the North Edisto River, and to the north by Bohicket Creek. To the east along the Atlantic shoreline as far as the Kiawah River, across which is the town of Kiawah Island. Most of the eastern border of the town, however, is next to unincorporated land. The city of Charleston is 25 miles (40 km) to the northeast.

According to the United States Census Bureau, the town of Seabrook Island has a total area of 7.0 square miles (18.1 km^{2}), of which 6.0 square miles (15.5 km^{2}) is land and 1.0 square mile (2.7 km^{2}), or 14.74%, is water.

== Geography and climate ==
Seabrook Island

Climate chart (precipitation, max. and min. temperature)
J	F	M	A	M	J	J	A	S	O	N	D
2.9 57 43	2.5 60 46	3.3 65 52	2.5 72 59	2.2 79 67	4.7 85 74	5.4 88 77	6.7 86 76	5.8 82 72	3.7 75 63	2.2 67 54	2.6 60 46
- █ Average max. and min. temperatures in °F
- █ Precipitation totals in inches
- Source: NOAA
Metric conversion
J	F	M	A	M	J	J	A	S	O	N	D
75 14 6	64 15 8	84 18 11	64 22 15	55 26 20	118 29 23	137 31 25	170 30 25	146 28 22	93 24 17	56 20 12	66 15 8
- █ Average max. and min. temperatures in °C
- █ Precipitation totals in mm

The Köppen Climate Classification System rates the climate of Seabrook Island as humid subtropical.[12] Ocean breezes tend to moderate the island climate, as compared to the nearby mainland were daytime highs are higher and nighttime lows are lower. Daytime mean highs in winter range from 55 to 60 °F (13 to 16 °C), with nighttime lows averaging 43 to 50 °F (6 to 10 °C). Summertime mean highs are 85 to 88 °F (29 to 31 °C), with average lows 74 to 76 °F (23 to 24 °C). Average rainfall is 48 inches per year. Accumulation of snow/ice is rare. The island is located borderline USDA Plant Hardiness Zone 8b/9a.

== History ==
In 1666, British subject Lt. Col. Robert Sanford arrived on Seabrook as an explorer in royal service to King Charles II. By 1684, the local Stono Indians were persuaded to cede their lands to the proprietary government, which in turn sold the property to English settlers. One of them being Robert Seabrook, an early settler and politician who the Island is named after.

During the American Revolutionary years, the island was used as a staging area for Hessian and British troops during the Siege of Charleston. In 1816, the island was sold to William Seabrook of nearby Edisto Island, a descendant of Robert Seabrook. Under Seabrook's ownership, the island was used for growing cotton. At the height of the Civil War, Seabrook sold the island to William Gregg, who rented the land to Charles Andell.

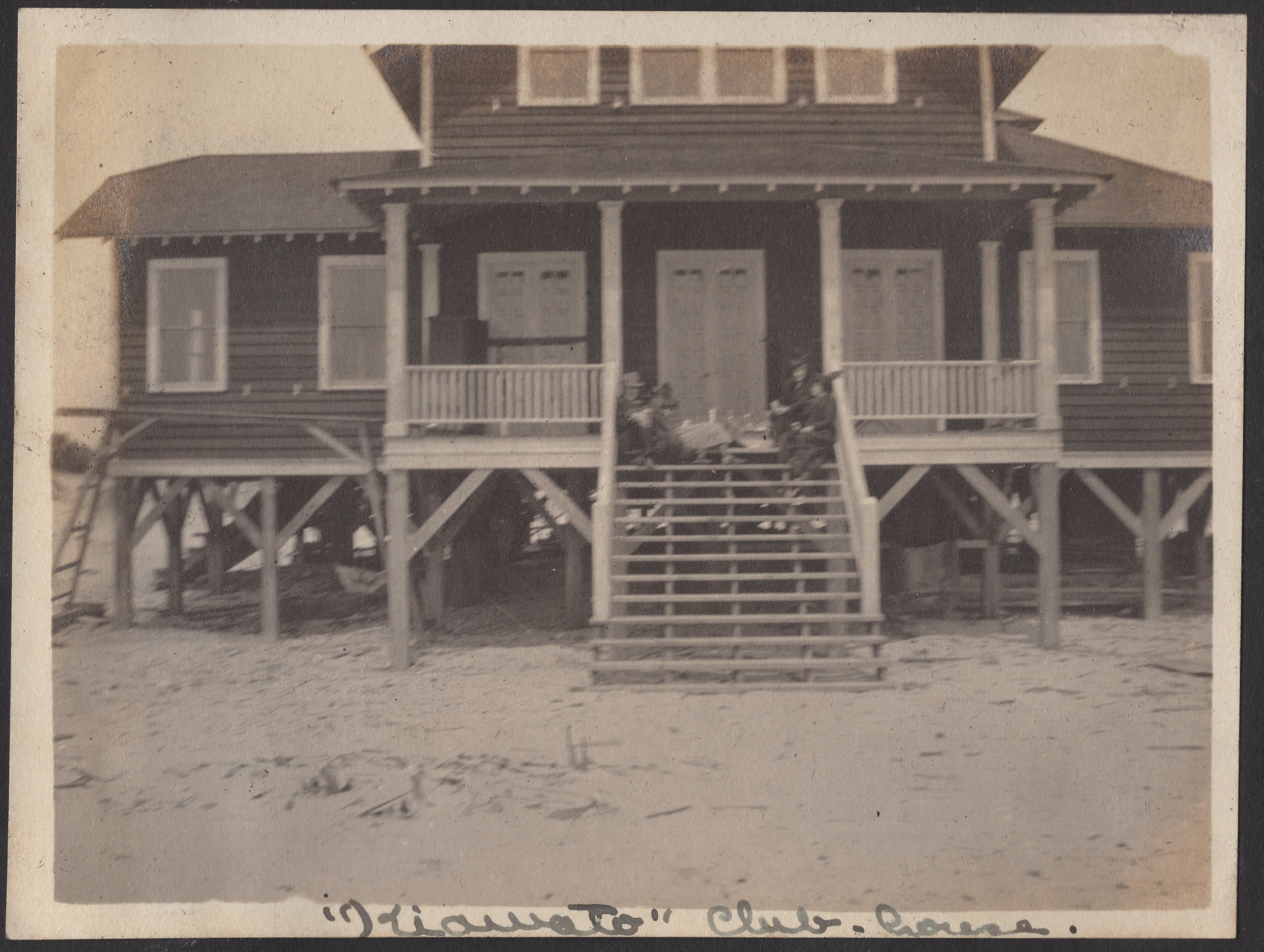
Kiawato Clubhouse (Seabrook Island) (c. 1918)

In 1917, the island was sold to sportsmen for hunting, fishing, and recreation; their club was known as the Kiawato Club, a portmanteau of Kiawah and Edisto, the two neighboring islands. Membership closed when the group had 50 members in 1918. The group's clubhouse at the mouth of the Edisto River, directly across from Rockville, was completed in 1918 on plans of architect David Hyer. The clubhouse was a 1 1/2-story, wooden building with six bedrooms on the first floor and a dormitory with many bunkbeds on the second floor.

Victor Morawetz, the owner of Fenwick Hall (a nearby plantation), bought the club's holdings in 1936. He did not intend to make it his personal residence but to resell it to a friend who would use the clubhouse as a winter retreat. He acquired another 560 acres from the Andell family adjacent to the old Kiawato Club in 1938.

In 1939, the Episcopal Diocese of South Carolina rented land on Seabrook to establish a summer camp for underprivileged children. In 1951, about 1,408 acres (5.70 km^{2}) of land, including the old Kiaweto Clubhouse, were given to the church by Mrs. Morawetz.

In 1970, the diocese sold about 1,100 acres (4.5 km^{2}) to private developers who planned the private, residential community that Seabrook Island is today. Seventeen years later, the town of Seabrook was incorporated, and it celebrated a decade of private ownership and self-government in 1997.

In 2005 Seabrook Island Club membership became a requirement for new purchasers of property on Seabrook.

== Demographics ==
Historical population
Census	Pop.	Note	%±
1880	50		—
1990	948		—
2000	1,250		31.9%
2010	1,714		37.1%
2020	2,050		19.6%
U.S. Decennial Census

=== 2020 census ===
Seabrook Island racial composition
Race	Num.	Perc.
White (non-Hispanic)	1,983	96.73%
Black or African American (non-Hispanic)	10	0.49%
Native American	2	0.1%
Asian	9	0.44%
Other/Mixed	25	1.22%
Hispanic or Latino	21	1.02%

As of the 2020 United States census, there were 2,050 people, 951 households, and 703 families residing in the town.

=== 2000 census ===
As of the census of 2000, there were 1,250 people, 660 households, and 465 families residing in the town. The population density was 206.0 inhabitants per square mile (79.5/km^{2}). There were 1,649 housing units at an average density of 271.7 per square mile (104.9/km^{2}). The racial makeup of the town was 97.04% White, 1.44% African American, 0.40% Native American, 0.08% Asian, 0.40% Pacific Islander, 0.32% from other races, and 0.32% from two or more races. Hispanic or Latino of any race were 0.88% of the population.

There were 660 households, out of which 3.6% had children under the age of 18 living with them, 68.2% were married couples living together, 2.3% had a female householder with no husband present, and 29.4% were non-families. 24.8% of all households were made up of individuals, and 11.8% had someone living alone who was 65 years of age or older. The average household size was 1.86 and the average family size was 2.14.

In the town, the population was spread out, with 3.0% under the age of 18, 3.1% from 18 to 24, 11.8% from 25 to 44, 40.9% from 45 to 64, and 41.2% who were 65 years of age or older. The median age was 62 years. For every 100 females, there were 89.7 males. For every 100 females age 18 and over, there were 89.2 males.

The median income for a household in the town was $66,548, and the median income for a family was $84,392. Males had a median income of $50,446 versus $40,000 for females. The per capita income for the town was $49,863. About 2.1% of families and 3.8% of the population were below the poverty line, including none of those under age 18 and 4.6% of those age 65 or over.

== Government ==
The city is run by an elected mayor–council government system.

== Education ==
There is one school district in the county, Charleston County School District.

It is zoned to Mount Zion Elementary School, Haut Gap Middle School, and St. John's High School.

== Notable person ==
- Samuel L. Reed (1934–2025), judge and politician
