= Pedro de Olivera y Fullana =

33rd Royal Governor of La Florida
- In office July 13, 1716 – October 30, 1716
- Preceded by: Francisco de Córcoles y Martinez
- Succeeded by: Juan de Ayala y Escobar

Personal details
- Born: Unknown
- Died: October 30, 1716 Saint Augustine, Florida
- Profession: Soldier and Administrator

Pedro de Olivera y Fullana, was the governor and captain general of Spanish Florida from July 13 to October 30, 1716. He died at the provincial capital, St. Augustine, just over three months into his term of office.

== Biography ==
In 1716, Chislacaliche, a mico, or chief, of the Lower Creek peoples, asked Olivera to send a Spanish envoy to the Creek territory to restore friendly relations and distribute gifts, as was customary among the Indians. Olivera, wanting to persuade the other Creeks to follow Chilacaliche and return to Apalachee Province in Florida, sent the retired lieutenant Diego Peña and four soldiers to their rebuilt towns on the Chattahoochee River. Peña departed St. Augustine on August 4 of that year, and on September 28 arrived at Apalachicola, where he summoned the chiefs of the province to distribute their expected gifts and beseech them to relocate to the "old fields" of Apalachee. He distributed firearms and ammunition to the chieftains, who in their turn gained stature among their own people by redistributing them to their warriors.

Olivera died in Saint Augustine on October 30, 1716, just over three months into his term of office, and was succeeded by interim governor Juan de Ayala y Escobar.
