= Francisco del Moral y Sánchez =

34th Royal Governor of La Florida
- In office May 21, 1734 – March 12, 1737
- Preceded by: Antonio de Benavides
- Succeeded by: Manuel Joseph de Justís

Personal details
- Born: Unknown
- Died: Unknown
- Profession: Administrator (governor of Florida)

Francisco del Moral Sánchez Villegas was the governor of Spanish Florida from mid-1734 to early 1737.

== Government in Florida ==
Moral Sánchez was appointed governor of the Spanish province of La Florida in 1734, assuming office on May 21 of that year.

In 1735 Moral Sánchez took steps to promote the production of naval stores, spars and masts to supply Cuban shipbuilders, but subsequent governors did little to continue this effort. That same year, he complained to the viceroyalty of New Spain that the merchants of Puebla (in modern Mexico) made a fifty percent profit on all goods shipped to Florida.

The following year, the British captured a Spanish ship carrying supplies and money from New Spain to the Spanish soldiers of Florida. Due to the resulting shortage of food, Moral decided to pay them with rum to try to alleviate their hunger or at least make them forget it temporarily.

During his administration, Moral Sánchez ordered Captain Rodrigo de Ortega to make a list of all the Native American provinces and towns, both Christian and unconverted, that once paid obeisance to the Spanish Crown. By 1736, the widely dispersed Franciscan missions of Spanish Florida had been reduced to a few in the area around St. Augustine, and more Indians in the interior were beginning to exchange goods with British and French traders. In the same year, Moral Sánchez reached a compromise with General James Oglethorpe, the governor of the British colony of Georgia, and signed a treaty with his representative, Charles Dempsey, by which the St. Johns River was recognized as a boundary between the neighboring colonies. Both parties agreed to control their Indian allies to try to avoid clashes each other.

Accepting the engineer Antonio de Arredondo's recommendations to improve St. Augustine's water and land defenses, in 1737 Moral Sanchez ordered the construction of two small wooden fortresses where the Indian trail to Apalachee crossed the St. Johns, including blockhouses, barracks, storehouses and batteries. One was built at Picolata on the east side, and another, Fort San Francisco de Pupo, on the opposite bank.

On March 12, 1737, Moral Sánchez was arrested, forced to leave the governorship, and recalled to Spain; he was replaced by Manuel Joseph de Justís.
