= Joseph Seabrook =

South Carolina planter and politician

- Seabrook family Coat of Arms

Member of the South Carolina House of Commons for St. Helena's Parish
- In office 1721–1724

Personal details
- Born: 1700 Colleton County, South Carolina, Province of Carolina
- Died: 10 June 1743 (aged 42–43) Province of Carolina
- Spouse: Elizabeth Whitmarsh
- Children: at least 5
- Parent: Robert Seabrook
- Occupation: Politician; Planter

Joseph Seabrook was an early American politician who served in the South Carolina House of Commons in the 1720s.

== Early life & Family ==
Joseph Seabrook was born in 1700 to Robert Seabrook and Sarah Collins. He married Elizabeth Whitmarsh and had at least 5 children with her.

== Political career ==
He served in the South Carolina House of Commons for St. Helena's Parish in the early 1720s, being one of the most promient Planters in his area.

== Later life & Legacy ==
He died in 1743 without a Will and his estate was filed in Colleton County, South Carolina by his wife Elizabeth who acted as administratrix.
