= Juan de Ayala y Escobar =

Spanish soldier and administrator

33rd Royal Governor of La Florida
- In office 30 Oct 1716 – 3 Aug 1718
- Preceded by: Pedro de Olivera y Fullana
- Succeeded by: Antonio de Benavides

Personal details
- Born: c. 1635 Havana, Cuba or Córdoba, Spain
- Died: May 28, 1727
- Profession: Politician and soldier

Juan Francisco Buenaventura de Ayala y Escobar (c. 1635 – May 28, 1727) was a prominent Spanish soldier and administrator who governed Spanish Florida from October 30, 1716, to August 3, 1718. The succeeding governor, Antonio de Benavides, a zealous reformer, accused Ayala of trading in contraband with the English, and had him arrested and briefly jailed in the Castillo de San Marcos of St. Augustine. He was eventually exiled to Cuba, where he died in 1727, before he was exonerated and all charges dropped in 1731.

== Biography ==
=== Early years ===
According to most historians writing in English, Ayala was born in Havana in 1635, although the Cuban historian Francisco Xavier de Santa Cruz states that he was baptized in the Cathedral of Córdoba (Spain) in 1650. As a young man, Ayala sailed for two decades on Spanish merchant vessels in the Caribbean, where he learned established trade routes and how to navigate the channels and harbors of the islands and mainland coastlines. He eventually settled in Cuba, where he married the daughter of the adjutant to the sergeant major of the presidio of Havana and decided to join the Royal Spanish Army. In 1677, he was made a captain of infantry, and in 1683 he was made warden of the garrison at the presidio of St. Augustine, serving as lieutenant of the Castillo, with the honorary rank of reformado captain.

=== Residence in La Florida ===
==== Military career in Florida, entrepreneurship ====
In September 1686, Ayala sailed to Spain to request more men to supplement the garrison in St. Augustine; the Junta de Guerra (Board of War) promised him 100 soldiers of infantry, although he returned to Florida with only 80 men. He took advantage of his official supply runs to Havana in the presidio's ship to purchase food and other supplies, which he resold in his own supply store in St. Augustine, as well as selling goods from his own home. In the years when the royal subsidy, or situado, was late in coming or never arrived at all, and the people of the city were on the verge of starving, he illegally obtained food from the English merchants of South Carolina to sell in his store at grossly inflated prices. Even the garrison soldiers were forced to buy meat and flour from him, paying with what little credit remained against their future wages.

In 1702, after certain Creek chiefs killed three of the four members of a delegation sent by the Apalachee to negotiate with them, José de Zúñiga y la Cerda, the royal governor of Florida, appointed Ayala visitador general (inspector general) of Apalachee Province to investigate the peace treaties that the Apalachee had made with neighboring tribes, including the Apalachicola. Ayala was promoted to sergeant major of the presidio of Saint Augustine, making him second-in-command to the governor, and in the following years he continued to rise in military rank.

==== Interim governorship and relations with the Native American tribes ====
After trying assiduously to obtain the governorship of La Florida, on October 30, 1716, Ayala was appointed acting governor. On April 4, 1717, Chipacasi, a mico, or head chief of the Lower Creeks, came to St. Augustine with a delegation of 157 Indians from different provinces to parley with Ayala, and discuss the desire of Emperor Brim, the mico of Coweta, for the Spanish to build a fort and trading post in Apalachee. According to the historian Steven C. Hahn, Chipacasi and three other head chiefs were dressed in the Spanish fashion when they entered the governor's quarters, where Chipacasi proceeded to deliver a long speech. Chipacasi pledged loyalty to the Spanish king and that the Creeks would fight for the Spaniards. When he finished, interim governor Ayala hugged him and had drinks served. They drank to the Spanish king's health, then Ayala proposed a toast to the mico of Coweta, and all joined in. The Indians then performed a musical ceremony and placed a feathered headdress, the symbol of a chief's authority, on Ayala's head, thus symbolically making him an Indian chief, and to their minds, obliging the Spanish governor to defend their interests. Historical documents, however, make it clear that the Indians did not consider themselves subjects of the foreign king.

The Creeks asked Ayala to rebuild the fort at San Marcos de Apalachee, which the Spanish had burned and abandoned in 1704 to prevent the British and their Indian allies from taking it. Spanish ships from Havana had formerly frequented its port to carry on trade with the Mission San Luis de Apalachee, exchanging goods for the agricultural produce of the mission, which was also evacuated and destroyed in 1704. The Creeks wanted to revive this commerce for their own benefit. Before leaving St. Augustine, the four Creek leaders requested weapons and ammunition, claiming they needed to defend themselves against the Cherokees. To demonstrate Spain's goodwill, Ayala gave them 154 muskets, two pounds of powder and three pounds of musket balls for each warrior.

=== Later years ===
Ayala was replaced on August 3, 1718, by the new governor, Antonio Benavides, a zealous reformer, who formally charged him with trading in contraband. He was arrested and briefly jailed in the Castillo, and eventually sent into exile in Cuba. He died at Havana in 1727, before he was finally exonerated and all charges dropped in 1731.

=== Personal life ===
Ayala y Escobar was married twice: the first time to a Floridano, Magdalena Diaz-Mexia y Sánchez, daughter of Lieutenant Juan Diaz-Mexia, sergeant major of the Plaza of St. Augustine, and Elvira Sánchez y Uriza, in the Cathedral of Havana on January 7, 1669. His second marriage was to another Floridano, Agustina Perez de Villarreal y Florencia, daughter of Captain Agustin Perez de Villarreal, Sergeant Major, and María de Florencia y de la Rocha, in the Parish of St. Augustine, Florida, on February 10, 1711.
