= José de Zúñiga y la Cerda =

Spanish colonial governor

31st Governor of La Florida
- In office 1699 – 9 April 1706
- Preceded by: Laureano de Torres y Ayala
- Succeeded by: Francisco de Córcoles y Martínez

Governor of Cartagena de Indias
- In office 1706–1710
- Preceded by: Juan Díaz-Pimienta y Solanarubias
- Succeeded by: Jeronimo de Badillo

Personal details
- Born: 1654 Havana, Cuba
- Died: 1725 (aged 70–71) unknown
- Profession: field master and governor

José de Zúñiga y la Cerda (1654–1725) was a Spanish nobleman, field marshal and governor of Spanish Florida (1699–1706) and Cartagena de Indias in present-day Colombia (1712–18). He served twenty-seven years in the Spanish Netherlands, rising to the rank of field marshal. He participated in the defense of the town of Melilla when it was besieged by the Moors.

== Political career ==
=== Governor of Florida ===
King Carlos II of Spain named Zúñiga Governor and Captain General of Spanish Florida on January 30, 1699. The oath of office with instructions concerning the responsibilities of his appointment was administered by the court of the Casa de Contratación (in English: House of Trade) in Seville, on May 20, 1699. He was given a license to carry four slaves, and he sailed to New Spain in the fleet commanded by General Manuel de Velasco y Tejada on May 23, 1699.

Zúñiga was governor of Florida from 1699 until 1706. In 1701, he appointed Juan de Ayala y Escobar as "visitador general" of Apalachee to investigate the terms of the peace that the native tribes there had made with other peoples, such as the towns of Apalachicola Province. During his administration he improved the castle (castillo) or fortress and the town defenses of St. Augustine, the capital of the province. In 1702 St. Augustine was besieged by English troops under Colonel James Moore, who lacked heavy artillery to capture the fort. The siege resulted in the burning of the town outside the fort. Zúñiga y la Cerda ordered the remaining Spanish missions in Apalachee and Timucua Province to be moved closer together for defensive purposes. The English and their Indian allies fled with the arrival of a relief flotilla commanded by Esteban de Berroa and Capt. Lope de Solloso, leading a team of Galician recruits and militia troops from Havana. Zúñiga's term as governor of Florida ended on April 9, 1706.

=== Governor of Cartagena de Indias ===
Zúñiga was appointed governor of Cartagena de Indias in 1706 (or 1712) to replace Juan Diaz Pimienta. He served until 1710 (or 1718), and returned to Spain in the only boat of the fleet of Admiral Antonio de Ulloa that survived a storm in the Bahamas. He died in 1725.

== Sources ==
- Alcedo, Antonio de (1812). The Geographical and Historical Dictionary of America and the West Indies. Vol. 1. London: G.A. Thomson Esq.
- Alcedo, Antonio de (1812). The Geographical and Historical Dictionary of America and the West Indies. Vol. 2. London: G.A. Thomson Esq.
- http://pares.mcu.es «AER (Archivos Españoles en Red)».
- Grady, Timothy Paul (2010) [1951]. Anglo-Spanish Rivalry in Colonial South-East America, 1650–1725. Gainesville, FL: University Press of Florida. ISBN 978-0-8130-1725-9. OCLC 245840026. Nº 14. Page 110.
- Boyd, Mark F; Smith, Hale G; Griffin, John W (1999) [1951]. Here They Once Stood: the Tragic End of the Apalachee Missions. Gainesville, FL: University Press of Florida. ISBN 978-0-8130-1725-9. OCLC 245840026.
- Olexer, Barbara (2005). The Enslavement of the American Indian in Colonial Times. Columbia, MD: Joyous. ISBN 978-0-9722740-4-3. OCLC 255476011.
