= List of ships of the Poyais scheme =

The Scottish adventurer and fabulist Gregor MacGregor promoted a settlement in Honduras that he called Poyais. In 1823, he chartered vessels to take settlers to the settlement. Four vessels actually carried settlers or supplies for the scheme:

- Honduras Packet (1800 ship) - first vessel to bring settlers
- Kennersley Castle (1811 ship) - second vessel to bring settlers
- Albion (1800 Whitehaven ship) - third vessel to bring settlers, but diverted to Belize on discovering that the previous settlers had abandoned their encampment
- Skene (1816 ship) - fourth vessel, but this one brought arms and supplies; diverted to Belize

Reports also exist that five more vessels set out for Poyais but that when word reached Britain that Poyais had no foundation in reality, the British Royal Navy intercepted them and turned them back.

By 20 August 1823 reports were appearing in The Times confirming earlier reports that Poyais was a fraud. Even so, it took some time for all to agree that the scheme was fraudulent. There are five vessels for which sailing advertisements and movement reports exist with Poyais as a destination, but that do not appear among the vessels that arrived at Poyais. One was wrecked.

- Albion, of 370 tons (bm) was scheduled to leave London on 20 August 1823. Albion, White, master, was reported to have arrived at Deal on 17 September from Poyais and Honduras, suggesting that she was one of the vessels that was intercepted.
- Alknomac, brig, 200 tons (bm), N. Williams, master. To sail immediately (March 1823). She returned to Gravesend on 24 June from Madeira.
- Mary, schooner, set to depart 24 February 1824.
- Oporto Packet, brigantine, 142 tons (bm), John Miles, master. To sail immediately (March 1825). She arrived at Jamaica on 28 April from London with destination Poyais.
- John, a snow of 147 tons (bm), Falvey, master, left Gravesend for Poyais on 30 March 1825 with Falvey, master. She left Deal on 3 April with Petrie, master. John, Pettrie, master, was wrecked on the Viceosa Reef in the Black River on 20 May. Her crew survived and reached Truxillo in her boats. Two other vessels wrecked near where John wrecked.
