= List of shipwrecks in January 1828 =

The list of shipwrecks in January 1828 includes some ships sunk, foundered, grounded, or otherwise lost during January 1828.

== 1 January ==
List of shipwrecks: 1 January 1828
Ship	State	Description
Adele	France	The ship was driven ashore at Cherbourg, Seine-Inférieure.
Aimable Adela	France	The ship was driven ashore at Cherbourg.
Angelem	France	The ship was driven ashore at Cherbourg.
Cambria	United Kingdom	The sloop was wrecked near Swansea, Glamorgan with the loss of all three crew. She was on a voyage from Barnstaple, Devon to Swansea.
Croith	France	The ship was driven ashore at Cherbourg.
Croisie	France	The ship was driven ashore at Cherbourg.
Esperance	France	The ship was driven ashore at Cherbourg.
Fanny	United Kingdom	The ship was wrecked in St Aubin's Bay, Jersey, Channel Islands with the loss of at least three lives.
Laurie	France	The ship was driven ashore at Cherbourg.
Liberty	United Kingdom	The ship was driven ashore crewless and wrecked at Walberswick, Suffolk.
Messager	France	The ship was driven ashore and wrecked at Cherbourg. She was on a voyage from Dunkerque, Nord to Martinique.
Mor Mar	France	The ship was driven ashore at Cherbourg.
Pacifique	France	The ship was driven ashore at Cherbourg.
Societé	France	The ship was driven ashore and wrecked at Cherbourg.

== 2 January ==
List of shipwrecks: 2 January 1828
Ship	State	Description
Active	United Kingdom	The brig was wrecked on the West Hoyle Bank, in Liverpool Bay.
George IV	United Kingdom	The ship departed from Lymington, Hampshire for Brighton, Sussex. No further trace, presumed foundered in the English Channel with the loss of all hands.

== 3 January ==
List of shipwrecks: 3 January 1828
Ship	State	Description
Active	United Kingdom	The ship was wrecked off Dog Island, Clifden, County Donegal. Her crew were rescued. She was on a voyage from Limerick to London.
Lovir	United Kingdom	The ship was wrecked at Milford Haven, Pembrokeshire. Her crew were rescued.

== 5 January ==
List of shipwrecks: 5 January 1828
Ship	State	Description
Henry	United Kingdom	The ship was driven ashore near Dragør, Norway.
Providence	United Kingdom	The ship was wrecked at Helsingør, Denmark. She was on a voyage from Saint Petersburg, Russia to Hull, Yorkshire.

== 7 January ==
List of shipwrecks: 7 January 1828
Ship	State	Description
Chelsea	United States	The ship was abandoned in the Atlantic Ocean with the loss of four of her crew. Survivors were rescued by Agaphea (United Kingdom). She was on a voyage from Charleston, South Carolina to Havre de Grâce, Seine-Inférieure, France.
General Moore	United Kingdom	The ship was driven ashore at Tenby, Pembrokeshire. She was on a voyage from Bridgwater, Somerset to Bury, Lancashire
Goytree	United Kingdom	The ship was driven ashore at Tenby.
Industry	United Kingdom	The ship was driven ashore at Whitby, Yorkshire. She was refloated on the next tide but consequently sank.
John	United Kingdom	The ship struck sunken wreckage off Bridlington, Yorkshire and sank. Her crew were rescued by the Bridlington Lifeboat.
Joseph	United Kingdom	The ship was driven ashore in Ballycotton Bay. Her crew were rescued. She was on a voyage from Liverpool, Lancashire to Youghal, County Cork.
Larch	United Kingdom	The ship was driven ashore at Falmouth, Cornwall. She was on a voyage from Newfoundland to Poole, Dorset.

== 8 January ==
List of shipwrecks: 8 January 1828
Ship	State	Description
Mary	United Kingdom	The sloop was lost at the mouth of the Humber with the loss of all hands.

== 9 January ==
List of shipwrecks: 9 January 1828
Ship	State	Description
Matilda	United Kingdom	The ship was wrecked in the River Plate.

== 10 January ==
List of shipwrecks: 10 January 1828
Ship	State	Description
Annesley	United Kingdom	The ship was driven ashore and wrecked at Orford, Suffolk or Seaford, Sussex. Her crew were rescued.
Centurion	United Kingdom	The ship was driven ashore and wrecked at Scarborough, Yorkshire with the loss of two of her crew. She was on a voyage from Copenhagen, Denmark to London.
May	United Kingdom	The coaster foundered in the North Sea off Cleethorpes, Lincolnshire with the loss of all three crew. She was on a voyage from King's Lynn, Norfolk to Selby, Yorkshire.
Providence	United Kingdom	The ship struck the breakwater and sank at Plymouth, Devon. She was on a voyage from Jersey, Channel Islands to Plymouth. Her crew were rescued by Hayden (United Kingdom).

== 11 January ==
List of shipwrecks: 11 January 1828
Ship	State	Description
Broughton Tower	United Kingdom	The ship was driven ashore and wrecked at St. Bees Head, Cumberland. Her crew surviveded.
Vine	United Kingdom	The ship was driven ashore and wrecked at St. Bees Head with the loss of two of her crew.
Westmorland	United Kingdom	The ship was driven ashore and wrecked at St. Bees Head. Her crew were rescued. She was on a voyage from Dublin to Whitehaven, Cumberland

== 12 January ==
List of shipwrecks: 12 January 1828
Ship	State	Description
Betsey	United Kingdom	The ship ran aground at Llanmadoc, Glamorgan and was abandoned by her crew, she was on a voyage from Swansea, Glamorgan to Barnstaple, Devon.
Charles	United Kingdom	The brig was wrecked off Ryhope, County Durham with the loss of all six of her crew.
Larina	United Kingdom	The ship was wrecked near Salcombe, Devon. She was on a voyage from London to Gibraltar.
Providence	United Kingdom	The ship was wrecked at Strangford, County Down. Her crew were rescued. She was on a voyage from São Miguel, Azores, Portugal to Glasgow, Renfrewshire.

== 13 January ==
List of shipwrecks: 13 January 1828
Ship	State	Description
Archangelo Raphael	Kingdom of the Two Sicilies	The polacca was driven ashore in Deadman's Bay with the loss of a crew member. She was on a voyage from Gallipoli, Apulia, to London, United Kingdom.
Cato	United Kingdom	The transport ship was driven ashore in Mountbatten Bay.
Heyden	United Kingdom	The transport ship was driven ashore in Mountbatten Bay.
Hussaren	United Kingdom	The brig was driven ashore and wrecked at Pegwell Bay, Kent. All on board were rescued. She was on a voyage from the Cape of Good Hope to London.
Jessie Lawson	United Kingdom	The ship was driven into Indian Trader (United Kingdom) during a gale. She then ran aground and was wrecked in Mountbatten Bay. All on board survived. Jessie was on a voyage from London to Van Diemen's Land.
John and Robert	United Kingdom	The transport ship broke free from her moorings when Tajo (Portugal) was driven into her. She then went ashore and was wrecked in Mountbatten Bay. Her crew survived.
Juno	United Kingdom	The brig was run down and sunk in the North Sea off Whitby, Yorkshire by Alert (United Kingdom). Her crew were rescued. She was on a voyage from London to Newcastle upon Tyne, Northumberland.
Jupiter	Sweden	The barque was driven ashore in Deadman's Bay. She was on a voyage from the Mediterranean to Christiania, Norway.
Lady Dundas	United Kingdom	The schooner was run into and severely damaged by HMS Conflict (Royal Navy). She sank the next day when the two vessels were parted.
Lavinia	United Kingdom	The schooner was driven ashore in Deadman's Bay. She was refloated on 15 January.
Mary Ann	United Kingdom	The brig was driven ashore in Bovisand Bay.
Ocean	United Kingdom	The ship was driven ashore near Bridlington, Yorkshire. Her crew were rescued by the Bridlington Lifeboat. She was on a voyage from Blakeney, Norfolk to "Barhead".
Sarah	United Kingdom	The brig was driven ashore at Falmouth, Cornwall. All on board were rescued. She was on a voyage from Newfoundland to Poole, Dorset.
Selina	United Kingdom	The West Indiaman was wrecked on Bolt Head, Devon with the loss of all hands.
Speculation	United Kingdom	The brig was driven ashore in Mountbatten Bay.
Stephen Knight	United Kingdom	The schooner was driven ashore and wrecked in Deadman's Bay. She was on a voyage from Llanelli, Glamorgan to London.
Union	United Kingdom	The ship foundered off Yealm, Devon. She was on a voyage from Fowey, Cornwall to Swansea, Glamorgan.
William and Thomas	United Kingdom	The schooner sank at Mount WisePlymouth. She was on a voyage from Sunderland, County Durham to HMNB Devonport.

== 14 January ==
List of shipwrecks: 14 January 1828
Ship	State	Description
Rein Deer	(United Kingdom of Great Britain and Ireland) British North America	The ship departed from Newfoundland for Halifax, Nova Scotia. No further trace, presumed foundered with the loss of all hands.
Sarah	United Kingdom	The ship was driven ashore and wrecked at Falmouth, Cornwall. All on board survived. She was on a voyage from Newfoundland, British North America to Poole, Dorset.

== 16 January ==
List of shipwrecks: 16 January 1828
Ship	State	Description
Hawk or Hawke	United Kingdom	The brig was driven ashore and wrecked on Garroch Head, Isle of Bute with the loss of two of her crew. She was on a voyage from Glasgow, Renfrewshire to Demerara.
Lawrence	United Kingdom	The ship foundered in the Irish Sea. She was on a voyage from Belfast, County Antrim to Greenock, Renfrewshire.
Mountaineer	United Kingdom	The ship was driven ashore and wrecked near Carlingford, County Louth. She was on a voyage from Dublin to Liverpool, Lancashire.
Reaper	United Kingdom	The ship was driven ashore and wrecked at Aldeburgh, Suffolk with the loss of all but one of her crew. She was on a voyage from Pillau, Prussia to London.
Sarah Ann	United Kingdom	The ship was wrecked off Portland, Dorset. She was on a voyage from the Clyde to Jamaica.
St. Lawrence	United Kingdom	The ship foundered in the Atlantic Ocean 300 nautical miles (560 km) west of the Shetland Islands with the ultimate loss of six of her nine crew.

== 17 January ==
List of shipwrecks: 17 January 1828
Ship	State	Description
Atlantic	United Kingdom	The ship was driven ashore and sank at North Shields, County Durham.
Hopewell	United Kingdom	The ship was driven ashore near Kilnsea, Yorkshire. She was on a voyage from London to Hull, Yorkshire.
John and Grace	United Kingdom	The ship was driven ashore near Liverpool, Lancashire.
Leda	United Kingdom	The ship was driven ashore near Bridlington, Yorkshire. Her crew were rescued.
Thames	United Kingdom	The ship was driven ashore at Filey, Yorkshire. She was on a voyage from Maldon, Essex to Scarborough, Yorkshire.

== 18 January ==
List of shipwrecks: 18 January 1828
Ship	State	Description
Malvina	United Kingdom	The ship sank at South Shields, County Durham.
Middelburg	Netherlands	The ship was lost on the Banyard Bank, in the North Sea off the coast of West Flanders.
Three Friends	United Kingdom	The ship was lost in the River Shannon with the loss of all hands. She was on a voyage from Liverpool, Lancashire to Terceira, Azores, Portugal.

== 19 January ==
List of shipwrecks: 19 January 1828
Ship	State	Description
Elizabeth	United Kingdom	The ship was wrecked on the coast of County Donegal with the loss of two of her crew. She was on a voyage from Letterkenny, County Donegal to Liverpool, Lancashire.

== 20 January ==
List of shipwrecks: 20 January 1828
Ship	State	Description
Hannah	United Kingdom	The ship was wrecked near St. Bees, Cumberland.

== 21 January ==
List of shipwrecks: 21 January 1828
Ship	State	Description
Rosamond	United Kingdom	The brig was run down and sunk in the North Sea off the mouth of the River Humber by HMS Sapphire (Royal Navy). Her crew were rescued by HMS Sapphire.

== 22 January ==
List of shipwrecks: 22 January 1828
Ship	State	Description
Calista	United Kingdom	The ship was wrecked at Madeira, Portugal.
Doris	United Kingdom	The ship was driven ashore at Boulogne, Pas-de-Calais, France. Her crew were rescued. She was on a voyage from Liverpool, Lancashire to Great Yarmouth, Norfolk. Doris was refloated in early February and taken in to Boulogne.

== 23 January ==
List of shipwrecks: 23 January 1828
Ship	State	Description
Betsey	United Kingdom	The ship ran aground at Whitehaven, Cumberland and was wrecked. She was on a voyage from Waterford to Whitehaven.

== 24 January ==
List of shipwrecks: 24 January 1828
Ship	State	Description
Mars	United Kingdom	The ship ran aground on the Goodwin Sands, Kent. She was refloated and beached at Broadstairs, Kent.

== 25 January ==
List of shipwrecks: 25 January 1828
Ship	State	Description
Duchess of Gloucester	United Kingdom	The ship was wrecked on Tobago. She was on a voyage from Puerto Rico to Trinidad.
Theresa	United Kingdom	The ship was wrecked at Alexandria, Egypt.

== 26 January ==
List of shipwrecks: 26 January 1828
Ship	State	Description
Camel	United Kingdom	The ship was destroyed by fire at Donaghadee, County Down. She was on a voyage from Larne, County Antrim to Liverpool, Lancashire.
Stirling	United Kingdom	The steamship was wrecked near Fort William, Scotland, Inverness-shire with the loss of two lives. She was on a voyage from Inverness to Glasgow, Renfrewshire.

== 27 January ==
List of shipwrecks: 27 January 1828
Ship	State	Description
Buckers	United Kingdom	The ship was wrecked off Antigua. She was on a voyage from St. Thomas, Virgin Islands to Antigua.

== 28 January ==
List of shipwrecks: 28 January 1828
Ship	State	Description
Jane	United Kingdom	The ship was lost in the Bay of Fundy. She was on a voyage from Saint John, New Brunswick, British North America to Jamaica.

== 29 January ==
List of shipwrecks: 29 January 1828
Ship	State	Description
James & Ann	United Kingdom	The ship was wrecked at Bamburgh, Northumberland.

== 30 January ==
List of shipwrecks: 30 January 1828
Ship	State	Description
Lawrence	United Kingdom	The ship foundered in the Irish Sea with the loss of all but two of her crew. She was on a voyage from Belfast, County Antrim to Greenock, Renfrewshire.

== 31 January ==
List of shipwrecks: 31 January 1828
Ship	State	Description
HMS Cambrian	Royal Navy	The frigate was in collision with HMS Isis off Gramvousa, Crete and the run aground, Her crew were taken off and she was subsequently wrecked.

== Unknown date ==
List of shipwrecks: Unknown date in January 1828
Ship	State	Description
David Cannon	United States	The ship was driven ashore at Barmouth, Caernarfonshire, United Kingdom. She was on a voyage from New Orleans, Louisiana to Liverpool, Lancashire, United Kingdom.
Express	United Kingdom	The ship sank in the River Moy at Ballina, County Mayo.
Friendship	United Kingdom	The ship was driven ashore and wrecked at Blackpool, Lancashire. Her crew survived. She was on a voyage from Waterford to Liverpool.
Jane	United Kingdom	The ship was wrecked in the Bay of Fundy before 28 January. Her crew were rescued. She was on a voyage from Saint John, New Brunswick, British North America to Jamaica.
La Seine	France	The brig was wrecked on the coast of Jutland.
Les Deux Amis	France	The ship foundered in the English Channel off Fowey, Cornwall, United Kingdom in late January.
Maria	United Kingdom	The ship was driven ashore near Portsmouth, Hampshire.
Minerva	United Kingdom	The ship struck the Kish Bank, in the Irish Sea and foundered. She was on a voyage from Caernarfon to Dublin.
Ocean	United Kingdom	The ship was driven ashore near Kinsale, County Cork.
Pelican	United Kingdom	The ship sank in King's Dock, Liverpool in early January.
Prosperity	United Kingdom	The ship was blown out to sea from São Miguel, Azores, Portugal. No further trace, presumed foundered in the Atlantic Ocean with the loss of all hands.
Thomas Bouche	United Kingdom	The ship was wrecked on the Marden Rocks, Larne Lough. Her crew were rescued. She was on a voyage from Liverpool to Mobile, Alabama, United States. She sank on 31 January.
Vesta	United Kingdom	The ship was wrecked near Hamburg before 19 January.
Woodman	United Kingdom	The ship was wrecked north of the Gut of Canso.
