= Skene (1816 ship) =

History

United Kingdom
- Name: Skene
- Owner: 1816:L. Skeene; 1824:S. Skene
- Builder: Leith
- Launched: 1816
- Fate: Wrecked 1824

General characteristics
- Tons burthen: 246, or 250 (bm)
- Propulsion: Sail
- Sail plan: Brig

Skene (or Skeene, or Skeen), was built at Leith in 1816. She made several voyages carrying emigrants from Scotland, twice to Canada and once for the Poyais scheme. She was wrecked immediately thereafter while sailing back to England from Saint Petersburg.

== Career ==
Skeene entered Lloyd's Register (LR) in 1816 with J. Mason, master, L. Skeene, owner, and trade Leith–New York.

On 16 May 1818 the "brig Skeene" arrived at Halifax, Nova Scotia, with 85 passengers after a voyage of 44 days from Leith.

In 1819 Captain George Bishop sailed the "brig Skeene" (or Skeen) from Leith and arrived at Halifax, on 1 May with 113 passengers. She sailed on to Quebec, where she arrived on 6 June.

On 2 November 1821 Skeen was sailing to Bristol from Waterford when she grounded. She was reported to be upright and expected to be got off.

On 5 March 1822, Skeen, Wilson, master, ran into a severe gale that took out most of her bulwarks and split her sails. The next day she came into the Clyde. She had been sailing from Liverpool to Rio de Janeiro.

Year	Master	Owner	Trade	Source
1822	Skene	S.Skene	Dublin–Waterford; Liverpool–Brazils	Register of Shipping (RS)
1823	Skene	S.Skene	Liverpool–Brazils	RS
1824	Wilson	S.Skene	Leith–Poyas.	RS

In 1823 the adventurer and fantasist Gregor Macgregor chartered Skene, John Wilson, master, to take 105 (or 109) emigrants from Leith to Poyais, the colony in Honduras that he was promoting. He had already dispatched Honduras Packet and Kennersley Castle. Skeen left Leith on 4 June with the settlers, together with stores and merchandise. By the time Skene arrived at Black River, Honduras, on 29 July 1823 the survivors from the two previous ships had already been rescued and taken to Belize. Skene sailed to Belize and left her passengers there. Some stayed on, but the widows and orphans were eventually repatriated to Scotland.

The investment frenzy and subsequent debacle gave rise to a number of ballads.

== Fate ==
Skene, Skene, master, was lost on 23 or 24 August 1824 on Rottumeroog, Groningen, Netherlands. She was on a voyage from St Petersburg, Russia to London.
