= Gregor MacGregor =

Scottish soldier, adventurer, and con man (1786–1845)

General Gregor MacGregor
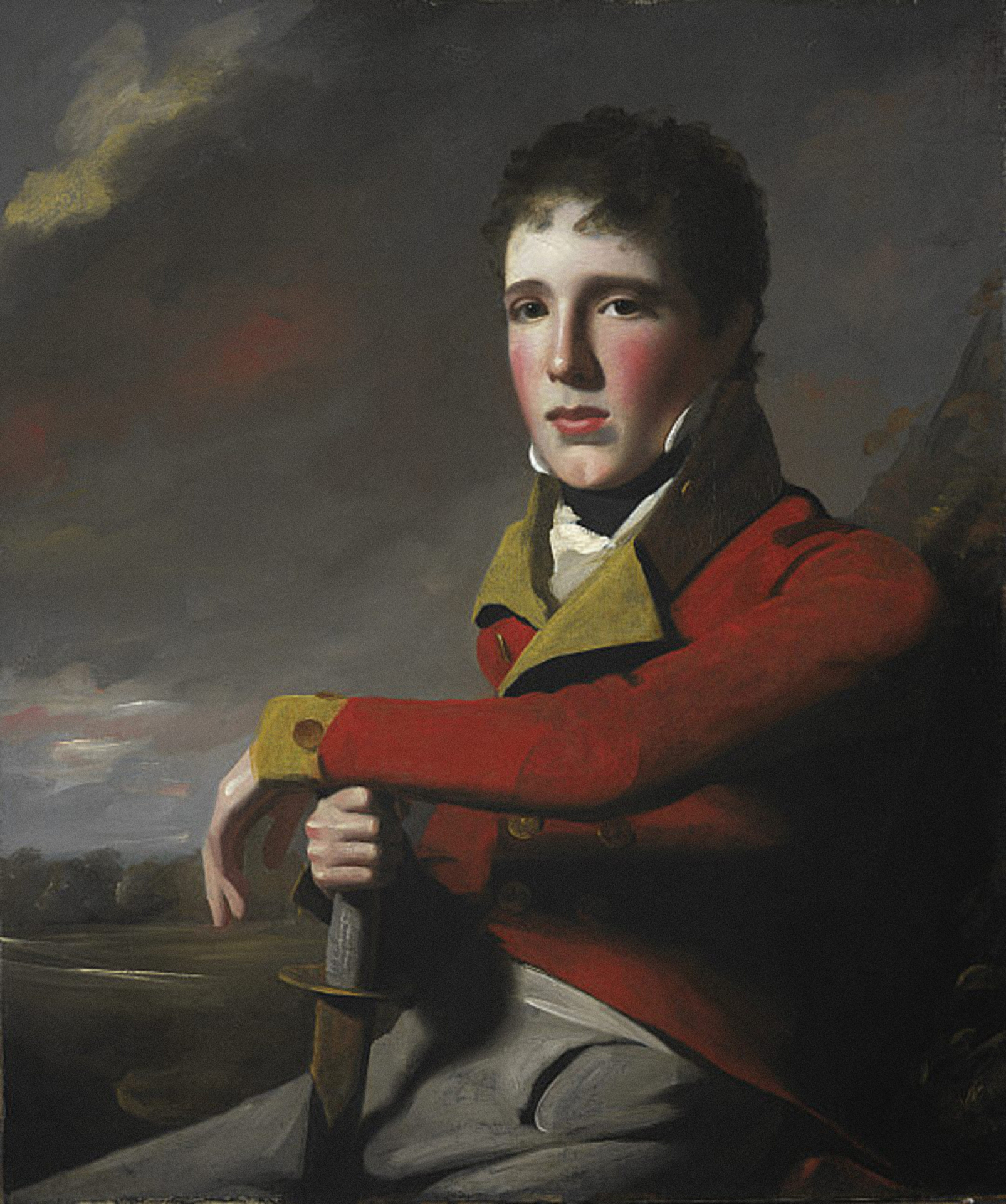
- 1804 portrait
- Born: 24 December 1786; Stirlingshire, Scotland
- Died: 4 December 1845 (aged 58); Caracas, Venezuela
- Burial place: Caracas, Venezuela
- Education: University of Edinburgh
- Military career
- Allegiance: United Kingdom (1803–1810); Venezuela (1812); New Granada (1813–1815, 1818–1819); Venezuela (1816–1817, 1839–1845)
- Branch: British Army (1803–1810); Portuguese Army (secondment, 1809–1810); Venezuelan Army (1812); New Granadian Army (1813–1815, 1818–1819); Venezuelan Army (1816–1817, 1839–1845)
- Rank: Divisional general (Venezuelan Army)
- Unit: 57th (West Middlesex) Regiment of Foot
- Known for: Poyais scheme
- Conflicts: Peninsular War; Spanish American wars of independence
- Awards: Order of the Liberators (Venezuela)
- Other work: Involved in Amelia Island affair of 1817. Claimed to be Cazique of Poyais from 1821 to 1837.

Gregor MacGregor (24 December 1786 – 4 December 1845) was a Scottish soldier, adventurer and con man who attempted from 1821 to 1837 to draw British and French investors and settlers to "Poyais", a fictional Central American territory that he claimed to rule as "Cazique". Hundreds invested their savings in supposed Poyaisian government bonds and land certificates. About 250 emigrated to MacGregor's invented country in 1822–1823 to find only an untouched jungle in Honduras; more than half of them died. MacGregor's Poyais scheme has been called one of the most brazen confidence tricks in history.

From the Clan Gregor, MacGregor was commissioned into the British Army in 1803 and participated in the Peninsular War before being discharged in 1810. He joined the republican side in the Venezuelan War of Independence in 1812, quickly became a general and, over the next four years, operated against the Spanish on behalf of both Venezuela and its neighbour New Granada. His successes included a difficult month-long fighting retreat through northern Venezuela in 1816. He captured Amelia Island in 1817 under a mandate from revolutionary agents to conquer Spanish Florida, and there proclaimed a short-lived "Republic of the Floridas". He then oversaw two calamitous operations in New Granada during 1819 that each ended with him abandoning the British volunteer troops under his command.

On his return to Britain in 1821, MacGregor claimed that King George Frederic Augustus of the Mosquito Coast in the Gulf of Honduras had appointed him Cazique of Poyais, which he described as a developed colony with a community of British settlers. When the British press reported on MacGregor's deception following the return of fewer than 50 survivors in late 1823, some of his victims leaped to his defence, insisting that the general had been let down by those whom he had put in charge of the emigration party. A French court tried MacGregor and three others for fraud in 1826 after he attempted a variation on the scheme there, but convicted only one of his associates. Acquitted, MacGregor attempted lesser Poyais schemes in London over the next decade. In 1838, he moved to Venezuela, where he was welcomed back as a hero. He died in Caracas in 1845, aged 58, and was buried with full military honours in Caracas Cathedral.

== Early life ==
=== Family and childhood ===
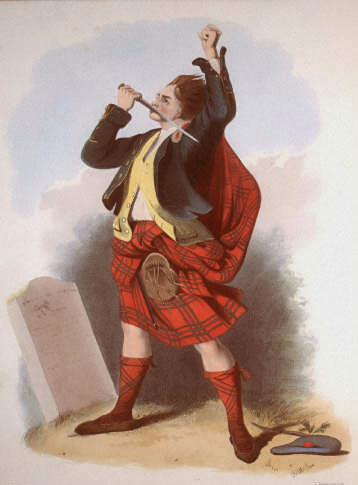
A romanticised depiction of a MacGregor clansman, by R R McIan

Gregor MacGregor was born on Christmas Eve 1786 at his family's ancestral home of Glengyle, on the north shore of Loch Katrine in Stirlingshire, Scotland. He was the son of Daniel MacGregor, an East India Company sea captain, and his wife Ann (née Austin). (Note: Some sources, including the Oxford Dictionary of National Biography, give MacGregor's place of birth as Edinburgh. A statement prepared by MacGregor himself in 1826, for a French audience, also describes him as born in the Scottish capital. Michael Rafter's 1820 biography of MacGregor says he was "born in the Highlands of Scotland"; Sinclair, in 2003, specifically identifies the place of birth as "the old MacGregor house of Glengyle" in Stirlingshire.) The family was Roman Catholic and part of the Clan Gregor, whose proscription by King James VI and I in 1604 had been repealed only in 1774. During the proscription, the MacGregors had been legally ostracised to the extent that they were forbidden to use their own surname—many of them, including Gregor's great-great-uncle Rob Roy, had participated in the Jacobite risings of 1715 and 1745. MacGregor would assert in adulthood that a direct ancestor of his had survived the Darien scheme of 1698, the ill-fated Scottish attempt to colonise the Isthmus of Panama. Gregor's grandfather, also called Gregor and nicknamed "the Beautiful", served with distinction in the British Army under the surname Drummond, and subsequently played an important role in the clan's restoration and rehabilitation into society.

Little is recorded of MacGregor's childhood. After his father's death in 1794, he and his two sisters were raised primarily by his mother with the help of various relatives. MacGregor's biographer David Sinclair speculates that he would probably have spoken mainly Gaelic during his early childhood, and learned English only after starting school around the age of five-and-a-half. MacGregor would claim in later life to have studied at the University of Edinburgh between 1802 and 1803; records of this do not survive as he did not take a degree, but Sinclair considers it plausible, citing MacGregor's apparent sophistication and his mother's connections in Edinburgh. (Note: Frank Griffith Dawson, MacGregor's biographer in the Oxford Dictionary of National Biography, endorses this claim, writing that MacGregor studied chemistry and natural sciences at the University of Edinburgh—but places these studies during MacGregor's time in the British Army, around 1808.)

=== British Army ===
MacGregor joined the British Army at 16, the youngest age it was possible for him to do so, in April 1803. His family purchased him a commission as an ensign in the 57th (West Middlesex) Regiment of Foot, probably for around £450. MacGregor's entrance to the military coincided with the start of the Napoleonic Wars following the breakdown of the Treaty of Amiens. Southern England was fortified to defend against a possible French invasion; the 57th Foot was at Ashford, Kent. In February 1804, after less than a year in training, MacGregor was promoted without purchase to lieutenant—an advancement that usually took up to three years. Later that year, after MacGregor had spent some months in Guernsey with the regiment's 1st Battalion, the 57th Foot was posted to Gibraltar.

MacGregor was introduced to Maria Bowater, the daughter of a Royal Navy admiral, around 1804. Maria commanded a substantial dowry and, apart from her by-now-deceased father, was related to two generals, a member of parliament and the botanist Aylmer Bourke Lambert. Gregor and Maria married at St Margaret's, Westminster in June 1805 and set up home in London, at the residence of the bride's aunt. Two months later, having rejoined the 57th Foot in Gibraltar, MacGregor bought the rank of captain for about £900, choosing not to wait the seven years such a promotion might take without purchase. The 57th Foot remained in Gibraltar between 1805 and 1809. During this time, MacGregor developed an obsession with dress, rank insignia and medals that made him unpopular in the regiment; he forbade any enlisted man or non-commissioned officer from leaving their quarters without wearing the full dress uniform.

In 1809 the 57th Foot was sent to Portugal as reinforcements for the Anglo-Portuguese Army under the Duke of Wellington, during his second attempt to drive the French out of Spain during the Peninsular War. MacGregor's regiment disembarked at Lisbon about three months into the campaign, on 15 July. By September it was garrisoning Elvas, near the frontier with Spain. Soon thereafter MacGregor was seconded to the 8th Line Battalion of the Portuguese Army, where he served with the rank of major from October 1809 to April 1810. According to Michael Rafter, author of a highly critical 1820 biography of MacGregor, this secondment came after a disagreement between MacGregor and a superior officer, "originally of a trivial nature", that intensified to such an extent that the young captain was forced to request discharge. This was promptly granted. (Note: MacGregor would assert much later that, as he was a Roman Catholic, the British Army had discriminated against him. There is no evidence to confirm this.) MacGregor formally retired from the British service on 24 May 1810, receiving back the £1,350 he had paid for the ranks of ensign and captain, and returned to Britain. The 57th Foot's actions at the Battle of Albuera on 16 May 1811 would earn it considerable prestige and the nickname "the Die-Hards"; MacGregor would thereafter make much of his association—despite having left the regiment one year prior.

=== Edinburgh to Caracas ===
On his return to Britain the 23-year-old MacGregor and his wife moved into a house rented by his mother in Edinburgh. There he assumed the title of "Colonel", wore the badge of a Portuguese knightly order and toured the city in an extravagant and brightly coloured coach. After failing to attain high social status in Edinburgh, MacGregor moved back to London in 1811 and began styling himself "Sir Gregor MacGregor, Bart.", falsely claiming to have succeeded to the MacGregor clan chieftainship; he also alluded to family ties with a selection of dukes, earls and barons. This had little bearing on reality but MacGregor nevertheless created an air of credible respectability for himself in London society.

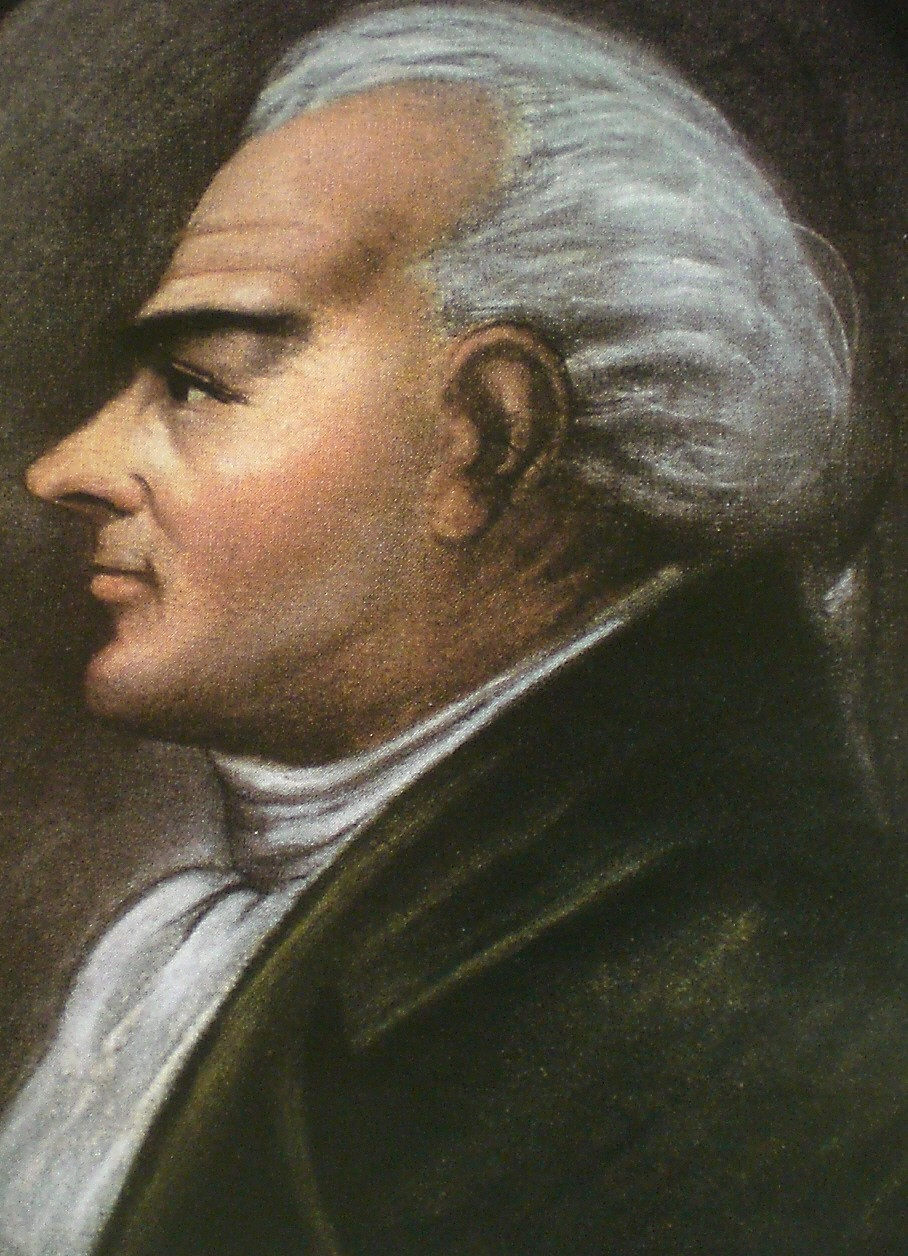
Francisco de Miranda, whom MacGregor possibly met in London

In December 1811, Maria MacGregor died. At a stroke MacGregor lost his main source of income and the support of the influential Bowater family. His options were, Sinclair suggests, limited: announcing his engagement to another heiress so soon after Maria's death might draw embarrassing public protests from the Bowaters, and returning home to farm the MacGregor lands in Scotland would be in his mind unacceptably dull. His only real experience was military, but the manner of his exit from the British Army would make a return there awkward at best.

MacGregor's interest was aroused by the colonial revolts against Spanish rule in Latin America, particularly Venezuela, where seven of the ten provinces had declared themselves an independent republic in July 1811, starting the Venezuelan War of Independence. The Venezuelan revolutionary General Francisco de Miranda had been feted in London society during his recent visit, and may have met MacGregor.

Noting the treatment England's highest circles had given to Miranda, MacGregor formed the idea that exotic adventures in the New World might earn him similar celebrity on his homecoming. He sold the small Scottish estate he had inherited from his father and grandfather and sailed for South America in early 1812. On the way he stopped in Jamaica, where according to Rafter he was tempted to settle among the planters and traders, but "having no introductory letters to that place, he was not received into society". After a comfortable sojourn in Kingston, he sailed for Venezuela and disembarked at La Guaira in April 1812.

== South America ==
=== Venezuela, under Miranda ===
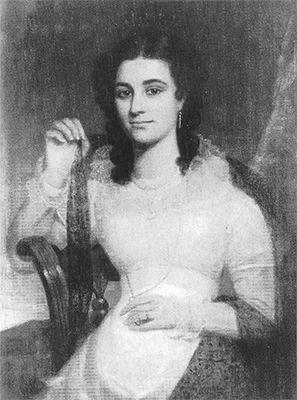
Josefa Lovera MacGregor, painted by Charles Lees in 1821

MacGregor arrived in the Venezuelan capital Caracas a fortnight after much of the city had been destroyed by an earthquake. With swathes of the country under the control of advancing royalist armies, the revolutionary government was losing support and starting to fracture. MacGregor dropped his pretended Scottish baronetcy, reasoning that it might undermine the republican credentials he hoped to establish, but continued to style himself "Sir Gregor" on the basis that he was, he claimed, a knight of the Portuguese Order of Christ. He offered his services directly to Miranda in Caracas. As a former British Army officer—from the famous "Die-Hards", no less—he was received with alacrity and given command of a cavalry battalion with the rank of colonel. In his first action, MacGregor and his cavalry routed a royalist force west of Maracay, between Valencia and Caracas. Subsequent engagements were less successful, but the republican leaders were still pleased with the glamour they perceived this dashing Scottish officer to give their cause.

MacGregor married Josefa Antonia Andrea Aristeguieta y Lovera, daughter of a prominent Caracas family and a cousin of the revolutionary Simón Bolívar, in Maracay on 10 June 1812. By the end of that month Miranda had promoted MacGregor to brigadier-general, but the revolutionary cause was failing; in July, after the royalists took the key port of Puerto Cabello from Bolívar, the republic capitulated. In the chaos that ensued Miranda was captured by the Spanish while the remnants of the republican leadership, including MacGregor with Josefa in tow, were evacuated to the Dutch colony of Curaçao aboard the British brig Sapphire. Bolívar joined them there later in the year.

=== New Granada; defence of Cartagena ===
With Miranda imprisoned in Spain, Bolívar emerged as the new leader of the Venezuelan independence movement. He resolved that they would have to take some time to prepare before returning to the mainland. Growing bored in Curaçao, MacGregor decided to offer his services to General Antonio Nariño's republican armies in Venezuela's western neighbour, New Granada. He escorted Josefa to lodgings in Jamaica, then travelled to Nariño's base at Tunja in the eastern Andes. Miranda's name won the Scotsman a fresh commission in the service of New Granada, with command of 1,200 men in the Socorro district near the border with Venezuela. There was little action in this sector; Nariño's forces were mainly engaged around Popayán in the south-west, where the Spanish had a large garrison. Rafter reports positively on MacGregor's conduct in Socorro, writing that "by the introduction of the European system of tactics, [he] considerably improved the discipline of the troops", but some under his command disliked him. An official in Cúcuta, the district capital, expressed utter contempt for MacGregor in a letter to a friend: "I am sick and tired of this bluffer, or Quixote, or the devil knows what. This man can hardly serve us in New Granada without heaping ten thousand embarrassments upon us."

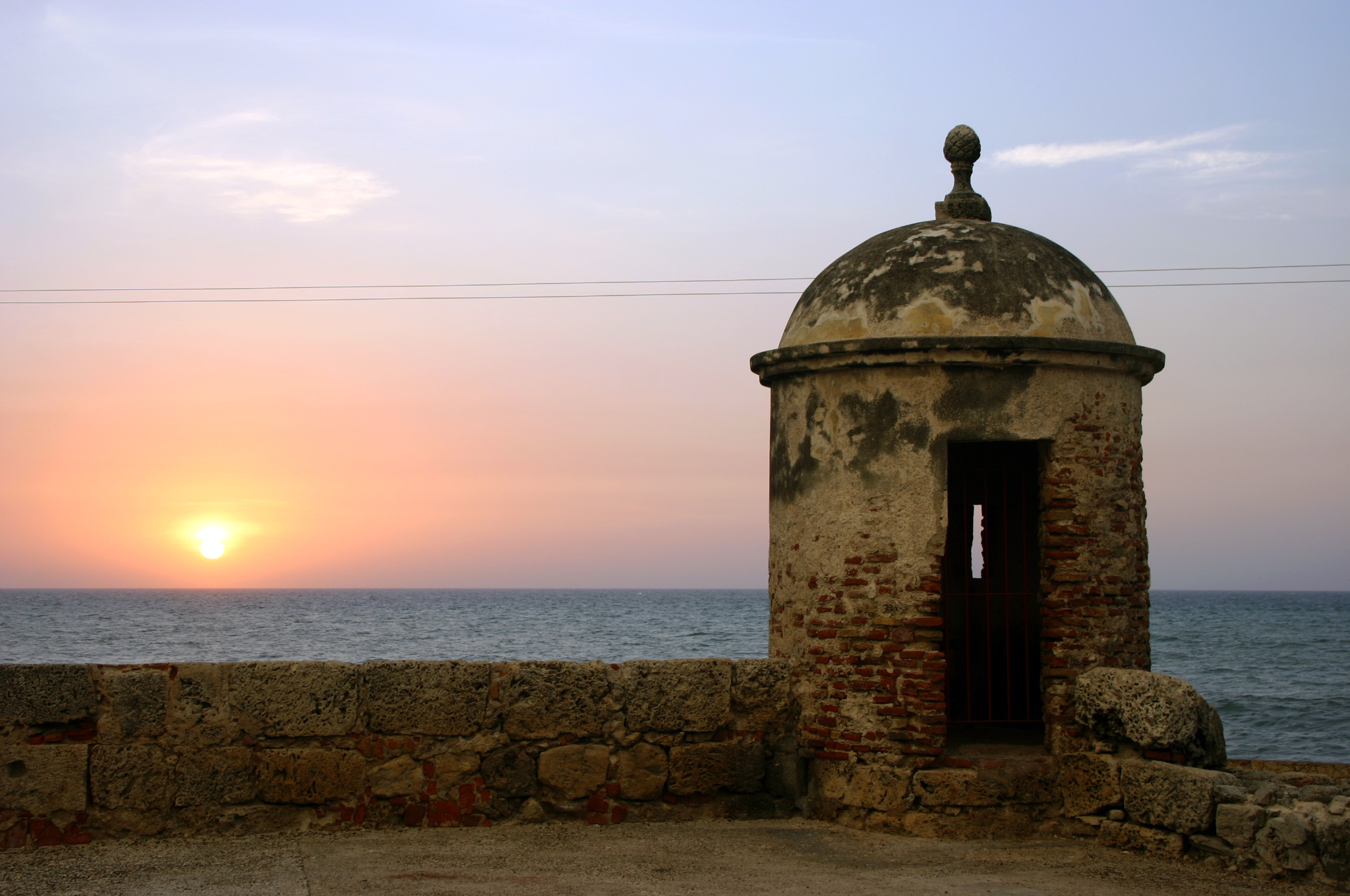
Battlements at Cartagena de Indias, where MacGregor took part in the defence against Spanish attackers in 1815

While MacGregor was in the New Granadian service, Bolívar raised a force of Venezuelan exiles and local troops in the port of Cartagena de Indias, and captured Caracas on 4 August 1813. The royalists quickly rallied and crushed Bolívar's second republic in mid-1814. Nariño's New Granadian nationalists surrendered around the same time. MacGregor withdrew to Cartagena, which was still in revolutionary hands, and at the head of native troops destroyed hamlets, local infrastructure and produce to prevent the Spanish from using them. A Spanish force of about 6,000 landed in late August 1815 and laid siege to the city. After repeatedly failing to overcome the 5,000 defenders, they deployed to subdue the fortress by blockade. Sinclair records that MacGregor played an "honourable, though not conspicuous" part in the defence.

By November 1815, there remained in Cartagena de Indias only a few hundred men capable of fighting. The defenders with the aid of the French corsair Louis-Michel Aury resolved to use the dozen gunboats they had to break through the Spanish fleet to the open sea, abandoning the city to the royalists; MacGregor was chosen as one of the three commanders of this operation. On the night of 5 December 1815, the gunboats sailed out into the bay, blasted their way through the smaller Spanish vessels and, avoiding the frigates, made for Jamaica. All the gunboats escaped.

=== Venezuela, under Bolívar ===
The British merchant class in Jamaica that had shunned MacGregor on his first arrival in 1812 now welcomed him as a hero. The Scotsman entertained many dinner parties with embellished accounts of his part in the Cartagena siege, leading some to understand that he had personally headed the city's defence. One Englishman toasted the "Hannibal of modern Carthage". (Note: Among the claims MacGregor made about Cartagena was that he had lost two children during the siege—Sinclair calls this "almost certainly a lie", noting the lack of evidence for any MacGregor children being born at this time, but proposes that Josefa may have suffered miscarriages, which would make her husband "guilty of hyperbole rather than outright lying". Whatever the truth, Sinclair comments, MacGregor's claim strongly implies that Josefa had left Jamaica at some point between 1812 and 1815 and joined him in New Granada.) Around New Year 1816, MacGregor and his wife made their way to Santo Domingo (today the Dominican Republic), where Bolívar was raising a new army. Bolívar received MacGregor back into the Venezuelan Army with the rank of brigadier-general, and included him in an expeditionary force that left Aux Cayes (now Les Cayes) on 30 April 1816. MacGregor took part in the capture of the port town of Carúpano as second-in-command of Manuel Piar's column, but is not mentioned in the record of the battle prepared by Bolívar's staff. After the Spanish were driven from many central Venezuelan towns, MacGregor was sent to the coast west of Caracas to recruit native tribesmen in July 1816. On 18 July, eight days after the numerically superior royalists countered and broke Bolívar's main force at La Cabrera, MacGregor resolved to retreat hundreds of miles east to Barcelona.

Two pursuing royalist armies harried MacGregor constantly as he retreated across country, but failed to break his rearguard. With no carts and only a handful of horses, the Scotsman was forced to leave his wounded where they fell. Late on 27 July, MacGregor's way east was obstructed by a royalist force at Chaguaramas, south of Caracas and about a third of the distance to Barcelona. MacGregor led his men in a furious charge that prompted a Spanish retreat back into Chaguaramas, then continued towards Barcelona. The Spanish remained in the town until 30 July, giving MacGregor two days' head start, and caught up with him only on 10 August. The Scotsman deployed his 1,200 men, mostly native archers, behind a marsh and a stream—the Spanish cavalry were bogged down in the marsh, while the archers repelled the infantry with volleys of arrows. After three hours MacGregor charged and routed the royalists. MacGregor's party was helped the rest of the way east to Barcelona by elements of the main revolutionary army. They arrived on 20 August 1816, after 34 days' march.

In Rafter's view, this marked "the zenith of MacGregor's celebrity" in South America. He had, according to his biographer Frank Griffith Dawson, "led his troops with brilliant success"; Sinclair agrees, calling the march a "remarkable feat" demonstrating "genuine military skill". With Bolívar back in Aux Cayes, overall command of the republican armies in Venezuela had been given to Piar. On 26 September, Piar and MacGregor defeated the Spanish army commanded by Francisco Tomás Morales at El Juncal. But MacGregor and Piar had several disagreements over the strategic conduct of the war—according to the American historian David Bushnell, the Scottish general probably "r[an] afoul of personal and factional rivalries within the patriot camp". In early October 1816, MacGregor left with Josefa for Margarita Island, about 24 miles (39 km) off eastern Venezuela, where he hoped to enter the service of General Juan Bautista Arismendi.

Soon afterward, he received an acclamatory letter from Bolívar: "The retreat which you had the honour to conduct is in my opinion superior to the conquest of an empire ... Please accept my congratulations for the prodigious services you have rendered my country". MacGregor's march to Barcelona would remain prominent in the South American revolutionary narrative for years. The retreat also earned him the title of "Xenophon of the Americas" (Spanish: Jenofonte de América).

=== Florida republic; Amelia Island affair ===
Arismendi proposed to MacGregor that capturing one of the ports in East or West Florida, which were then Spanish colonies, might provide an excellent springboard for republican operations elsewhere in Latin America. MacGregor liked the idea and, after an abortive attempt to recruit in Haiti, sailed with Josefa to the United States to raise money and volunteers. Soon after he left in early 1817, a further congratulatory letter arrived in Margarita from Bolívar, promoting MacGregor to divisional general, awarding him the Orden de los Libertadores (Order of the Liberators), and asking him to return to Venezuela. MacGregor remained ignorant of this for two years. On 31 March 1817 in Philadelphia, MacGregor received a document from Lino de Clemente, Pedro Gual, and Martin Thompson, each of whom claimed to speak for one or more of the Latin American republics. They called themselves the "deputies of free America" and called upon MacGregor to take possession of "both the Floridas, East and West" as soon as possible. (Note: Clemente was one of Bolívar's agents, Gual signed in the name of New Granada and Mexico, and Thompson, a US citizen, informally represented the United Provinces of the River Plate. According to Bushnell, none of these governments had specifically instructed any action in Florida, which at that time was a Spanish province of the Captaincy General of Cuba.) Florida's proposed fate was not specified; MacGregor presumed that the Floridians would seek US annexation, as they were mostly of non-Spanish origin, and that the US would quickly comply. He thus expected at least covert support from the US government.

MacGregor raised several hundred armed men for this enterprise in the Mid-Atlantic states, South Carolina, and particularly Savannah, Georgia. He also raised $160,000 by the sale of "scripts" to investors, promising them fertile acres in Florida or their money back with interest. He determined to first attack Fernandina, a small settlement with a fine harbor at the very northern tip of Amelia Island, which contained about 40% of East Florida's population (recorded as 3,729 in 1815). He expected little to no resistance from the tiny Spanish garrison there. MacGregor left Charleston in a ship with fewer than 80 men, mostly US citizens including a former Pennsylvania congressman named Jared Irwin, a Royal Marine veteran George Woodbine, a Scot trader Robert Ambrister and a veteran Ruggles Hubbard. He led the landing party personally on 29 June 1817 with the words: "I shall sleep either in hell or Amelia tonight!" The Spanish commander at Fort San Carlos, with 51 men and several cannon, vastly overestimated the size of MacGregor's force and surrendered without either side firing a shot.

Amelia Island's location in modern Florida. Inset: the Green Cross flag raised by MacGregor, later the flag was reused by MacGregor as the flag of the fraudulent country of Poyais

Few of Amelia's residents came out to support MacGregor but, at the same time, there was little resistance; most simply left for mainland Florida or Georgia. MacGregor raised a flag showing a green cross on a white field—the "Green Cross of Florida"—and issued a proclamation on 30 June urging the island's inhabitants to return and support him. This was largely ignored, as was a second proclamation in which MacGregor congratulated his men on their victory and exhorted them to "free the whole of the Floridas from Tyranny and oppression".

MacGregor announced a "Republic of the Floridas" under a government headed by himself. He attempted to tax the local pirates' booty at an "admiralty court", and tried to raise money by seizing and selling dozens of slaves found on the island. Morale among the troops plummeted when he prohibited looting. Most of his recruits were still in the US; American authorities prevented most of them from leaving port, and MacGregor was able to muster only 200 on Amelia. His officers clamoured for an invasion of mainland Florida, but he insisted that they did not have enough men, arms, or supplies. Bushnell suggests that MacGregor's backers in the US may have promised him more support in these regards than they ultimately provided. Eighteen men sent to reconnoitre around St Augustine in late July 1817 were variously killed, wounded, or captured by the Spanish. Discipline disintegrated among MacGregor's troops, who were paid first in "Amelia dollars" that he had printed, and later not at all.

Spanish forces congregated on the mainland opposite Amelia, and MacGregor and most of his officers decided on 3 September 1817 that the situation was hopeless and that they would abandon the venture. MacGregor announced to the men that he was leaving, explaining vaguely that he had been "deceived by my friends." He turned over the command to one of his subordinates, a former Pennsylvania congressman named Jared Irwin, and he boarded the Morgiana with his wife on 4 September 1817 with an angry crowd looking on and hurling insults at him. He waited offshore for a few days, then left on the schooner Venus on 8 September. Two weeks later, the MacGregors arrived at Nassau in the Bahamas, where he arranged to have commemorative medallions struck bearing the Green Cross motif and the Latin inscriptions Amalia Veni Vidi Vici ("Amelia, I Came, I Saw, I Conquered") and Duce Mac Gregorio Libertas Floridarium ("Liberty for the Floridas under the leadership of MacGregor"). He made no attempt to repay those who had funded the Amelia expedition. Irwin's troops defeated two Spanish assaults and were then joined by 300 men under Louis-Michel Aury, who held Amelia for three months before surrendering to American forces, who held the island "in trust for Spain" until the Florida Purchase in 1819.

Press reports of the Amelia Island affair were wildly inaccurate, partly because of misinformation disseminated by MacGregor himself. His sudden departure, he claimed, was because he had sold the island to Aury for $50,000. Josefa gave birth to their first child in Nassau on 9 November 1817, a boy named Gregorio. The owner of the Venus was an ex-captain of the British Corps of Colonial Marines named George Woodbine. He drew MacGregor's attention to the British Legions being raised by the Latin American revolutionaries in London, and suggested that he could recruit and command such a force himself. MacGregor was excited by the idea of leading British troops again after years in command of colonials, tribesmen, and miscellaneous adventurers. He sailed for home with Josefa and Gregorio and landed in Dublin on 21 September 1818, and from there made his way back to London.

=== Porto Bello ===
The third Venezuelan republic's envoy in the British capital borrowed £1,000 for MacGregor to engage and transport British troops for service in Venezuela, but the Scotsman squandered these funds within a few weeks. A London financier, an old friend of MacGregor's called Thomas Newte, took responsibility for the envoy's debt on the condition that the general instead take troops to New Granada. MacGregor funded his expedition through the sale of commissions at rates cheaper than those offered by the British Army, and assembled enlisted men through a network of recruiters across the British Isles, offering volunteers huge financial incentives. MacGregor sailed for South America on 18 November 1818 aboard a former Royal Navy brigantine, renamed the Hero; 50 officers and over 500 troops, many of them Irish, followed the next month. They were critically under-equipped, having virtually no arms or munitions.

The men came close to mutiny at Aux Cayes in February 1819 when MacGregor failed to produce the 80 silver dollars per man on arrival promised by his recruiters. MacGregor persuaded South American merchants in Haiti to support him with funds, weapons and ammunition, but then procrastinated and gave the order to sail for the island of San Andrés, off the Spanish-controlled Isthmus of Panama, only on 10 March. Going first to Jamaica to arrange accommodation for Josefa and Gregorio, MacGregor was almost arrested there on charges of gun-running. He joined his troops on San Andrés on 4 April. The delay had led to renewed dissension in the ranks that the stand-in commander Colonel William Rafter had difficulty containing. MacGregor restored morale by announcing that they would set out to attack Porto Bello on the New Granadian mainland the following day.

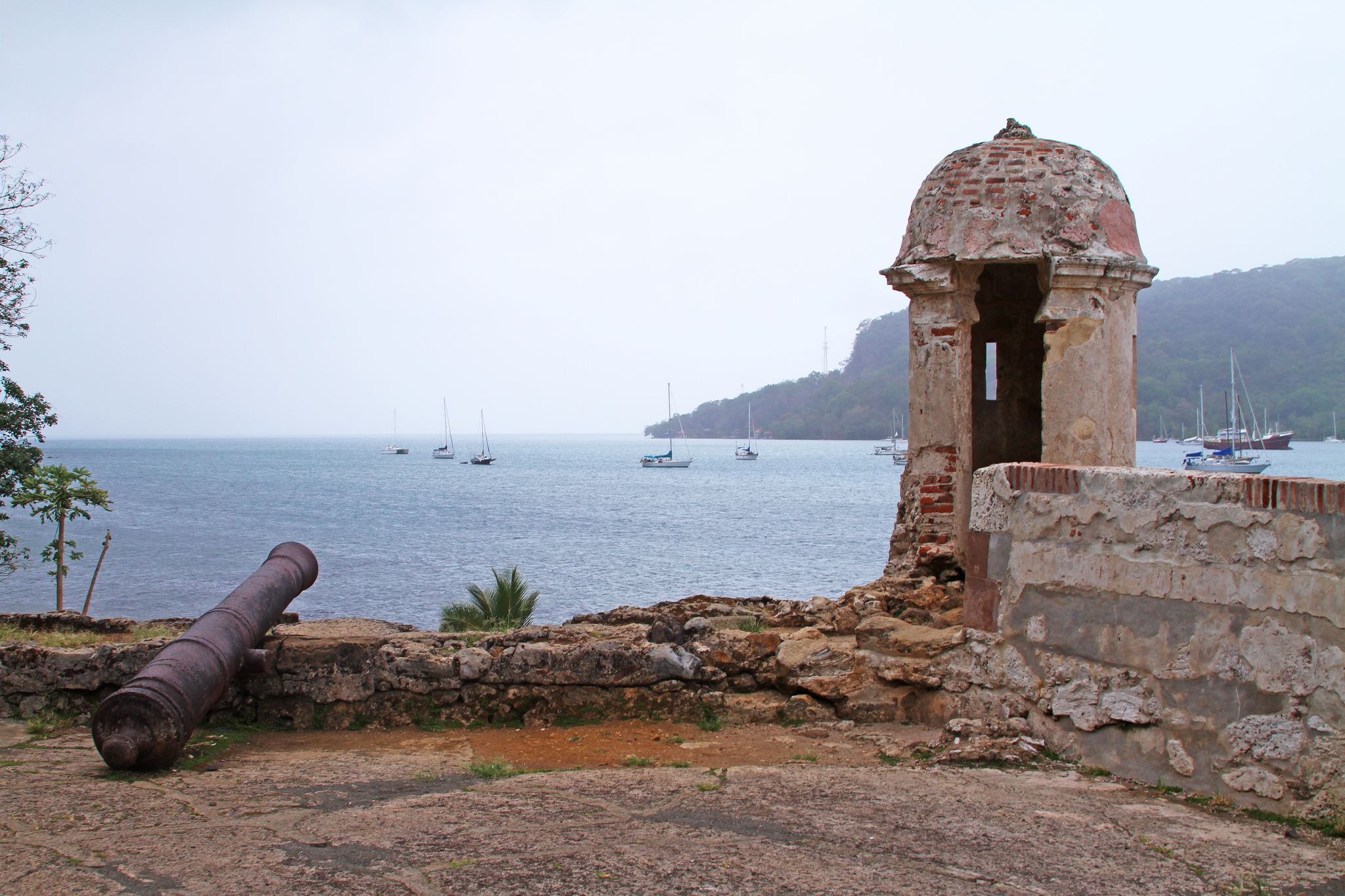
Part of the fort at Porto Bello, Panama, where MacGregor abandoned his troops led by Colonel William Rafter in April 1819

Colonel Rafter disembarked with 200 men near Porto Bello on 9 April, outflanked a roughly equal force of Spanish defenders during the night, and marched into Porto Bello without a fight on 10 April. MacGregor, watching from one of the ships with Woodbine—to whom he had given the rank of colonel—quickly came ashore when he sighted Rafter's signal of victory, and, as usual, issued a flowery proclamation: "Soldiers! Our first conquest has been glorious, it has opened the road to future and additional fame." Rafter urged MacGregor to march on Panama City, but MacGregor did not make much in the way of plans to continue the campaign. He devoted most of his attention to the particulars of a new chivalric order of his design, the emblem of which would be a Green Cross. The troops became mutinous again after more promised money failed to materialise—MacGregor eventually paid each man $20, but this did little to restore discipline.

The lack of patrolling by MacGregor's troops allowed the Spanish to march straight into Porto Bello early on 30 April 1819. MacGregor was still in bed when the Spaniards found his riflemen drilling in the main square and opened fire. Awoken by the noise, MacGregor threw his bed and blankets from the window onto the beach below and jumped out after them, then attempted to paddle out to his ships on a log. He passed out and would probably have drowned had he not been picked up and brought aboard the Hero by one of his naval officers.

MacGregor would claim that on regaining consciousness he immediately raised his standard over the Hero, then despatched runners to Rafter ordering him not to surrender. The version of events favoured by Sinclair is that Rafter received orders to this effect only after he had himself contacted MacGregor on the Hero. Rafter, in the fort with 200 men, kept up a steady barrage and waited for his commander to fire on the royalists from the ships—but to the colonel's astonishment MacGregor instead ordered his fleet to turn about and made for the high seas. (Note: MacGregor had five ships—the Hero and the four others that had carried the troops from Britain.)

Abandoned, Colonel Rafter and the remnants of MacGregor's army had no choice but to surrender; most of the surviving officers and troops entered miserable existences in captivity. Rafter was ultimately shot with 11 other officers for conspiring to escape. (Note: Although it soon became public knowledge that MacGregor had suffered a humiliating defeat at Porto Bello, the full story of how he had abandoned his troops emerged only a year later with the publishing of a survivor's account in the press and of the book by William Rafter's brother Michael in June 1820. MacGregor responded in 1821 with a heavily embellished account in which he claimed to have been forced to withdraw after a Latin American officer betrayed him and William Rafter let him down.)

=== Rio de la Hacha ===
Making his way first to San Andrés, then Haiti, MacGregor conferred invented decorations and titles on his officers and planned an expedition to Rio de la Hacha in northern New Granada. He was briefly delayed in Haiti by a falling-out with his naval commander, an officer called Hudson. When the naval officer fell ill, MacGregor had him put ashore, seized the Hero—which Hudson owned—and renamed her El MacGregor, explaining to the Haitian authorities that "drunkenness, insanity and mutiny" by his captain had forced him to take the ship. MacGregor steered the hijacked brigantine to Aux Cayes, then sold her after she was found to be unseaworthy. Waiting for him in Aux Cayes were 500 officers and enlisted men, courtesy of recruiters in Ireland and London, but he had no ships to carry them and little in the way of equipment. This was remedied during July and August 1819, first by the arrival of his Irish recruiter Colonel Thomas Eyre with 400 men and two ships—MacGregor gave him the rank of general and the Order of the Green Cross—and then by the appearance of war materiel from London, sent by Thomas Newte on a schooner named Amelia.

MacGregor bombastically announced his intention to liberate New Granada, but then hesitated. The lack of action, rations or pay for weeks prompted most of the British volunteers to go home. MacGregor's force, which had comprised 900 men at its peak (including officers), had dwindled to no more than 250 by the time he directed the Amelia and two other vessels to Rio de la Hacha on 29 September 1819. His remaining officers included Lieutenant-Colonel Michael Rafter, who had bought a commission with the hope of rescuing his brother William. After being driven away from Rio de la Hacha harbour by cannon on 4 October, MacGregor ordered a night landing west of the town and said that he would take personal command once the troops were ashore. Lieutenant-Colonel William Norcott led the men onto the beach and waited there two hours for MacGregor to arrive, but the general failed to appear. Attacked by a larger Spanish force, Norcott countered and captured the town. MacGregor still refused to leave the ships, convinced that the flag flying over the fort must be a trick; even when Norcott rowed out to tell him to come into port, MacGregor would not step ashore for over a day. When he did appear, many of his soldiers swore and spat at him. He issued another lofty proclamation, recalled by Rafter as an "aberration of human intellect", at the foot of which MacGregor identified himself as "His Majesty the Inca of New Granada". (Note: According to Rafter's book, the basis for this was a story circulated at the time, believed and talked about by MacGregor himself, that the MacGregor emigrant to Darien in 1698 had married a local princess, from whom all subsequent members of the MacGregor line were descended. Sinclair comments that MacGregor was indeed unusually swarthy for a Scotsman, and that if there was truth in the Darien story "it might go some way towards explaining his behaviour in relation to Poyais".)

Events went largely as they had done earlier in the year at Porto Bello. MacGregor abstained from command in all but name, and the troops descended into a state of confused drunkenness. "General MacGregor displayed so palpable a want of the requisite qualities which should distinguish the commander of such an expedition," Rafter wrote, "that universal astonishment prevailed amongst his followers at the reputation he had for some time maintained." As Spanish forces gathered around the town, Norcott and Rafter decided the situation was hopeless and left on a captured Spanish schooner on 10 October 1819, taking with them five officers and 27 soldiers and sailors. MacGregor convened his remaining officers the next day and, giving them promotions and Green Cross decorations, exhorted them to help him lead the defence. Immediately afterwards he went to the port, ostensibly to escort Eyre's wife and two children to safety on a ship. After putting the Eyres on the Lovely Ann, he boarded the Amelia and ordered the ships out to sea just as the Spanish attacked. General Eyre and the troops left behind were all killed.

MacGregor reached Aux Cayes to find news of this latest debacle had preceded him, and he was shunned. A friend in Jamaica, Thomas Higson, informed him through letters that Josefa and Gregorio had been evicted, and until Higson's intervention had sought sanctuary in a slave's hut. MacGregor was wanted in Jamaica for piracy and so could not join his family there. He similarly could not go back to Bolívar, who was so outraged by MacGregor's recent conduct that he accused the Scotsman of treason and ordered his death by hanging if he ever set foot on the South American mainland again. MacGregor's whereabouts for the half year following October 1819 are unknown. Back in London in June 1820, Michael Rafter published his highly censorious account of MacGregor's adventures, Memoirs of Gregor M'Gregor, dedicating the book to his brother Colonel William Rafter and the troops abandoned at Porto Bello and Rio de la Hacha. In his summary Rafter speculated that following the latter episode MacGregor was "politically, though not naturally dead"—"to suppose", he wrote, "that any person could be induced again to join him in his desperate projects, would be to conceive a degree of madness and folly of which human nature, however fallen, is incapable".

== Poyais scheme ==
=== Cazique of Poyais ===
Supposed location of Poyais and places relevant to MacGregor's prior exploits

MacGregor's next known location is at the court of King George Frederic Augustus of the Mosquito Coast, at Cape Gracias a Dios on the Gulf of Honduras in April 1820. The Miskito people, descendants of shipwrecked African slaves and indigenous people, shared the historic British antipathy towards Spain, and the British authorities in the region had crowned their most powerful chieftains as "kings" since the 17th century. These were kings in little more than name, with no effective control over the country they ostensibly led; Britain crowned and protected them simply so they could declare the area to be under Mosquito sovereignty and thereby obstruct Spanish claims. There had been a modest British settlement on the coast around the Black River (now the Río Sico), but this had been evacuated following the Anglo-Spanish Convention of 1786. By the 1820s the most visible sign of prior colonisation was a small graveyard overgrown by the jungle.

On 29 April 1820, George Frederic Augustus signed a document granting MacGregor and his heirs a substantial swathe of Mosquito territory—8,000,000 acres (12,500 square miles; 32,375 square kilometres), an area larger than Wales—in exchange for rum and jewellery. The land was pleasing to the eye but unfit for cultivation and could sustain little in the way of livestock. Its area was roughly a triangle with corners at Cape Gracias a Dios, Cape Camarón and the Black River's headwaters. MacGregor dubbed this area "Poyais" after the natives of the highlands around the Black River's source, the Paya or "Poyer" people (today called the Pech), and in mid-1821 appeared back in London calling himself the Cazique of Poyais—"Cazique", a Spanish-American word for a native chief, being equivalent in MacGregor's usage to "Prince". He claimed to have been created such by the Mosquito king, but in fact both the title and Poyais were of his own invention.

Despite Rafter's book, London society remained largely unaware of MacGregor's failures over the past few years, but remembered successes such as his march to Barcelona; similarly his association with the "Die-Hards" of the 57th Foot was recalled, but his dubious early discharge was not. In this climate of a constantly shifting Latin America, where governments rose, fell, and adopted new names from year to year, it did not seem so implausible that there might be a country called Poyais or that a decorated general like MacGregor might be its leader. The Cazique became "a great adornment for the dinner tables and ballrooms of sophisticated London", Sinclair writes. Rumours abounded that he was partially descended from indigenous royalty. His exotic appeal was enhanced by the arrival of the striking "Princess of Poyais", Josefa, who had given birth to a girl named Josefa Anna Gregoria at MacGregor's sister's home in Ireland. The MacGregors received countless social invitations, including an official reception at Guildhall from the Lord Mayor of London.

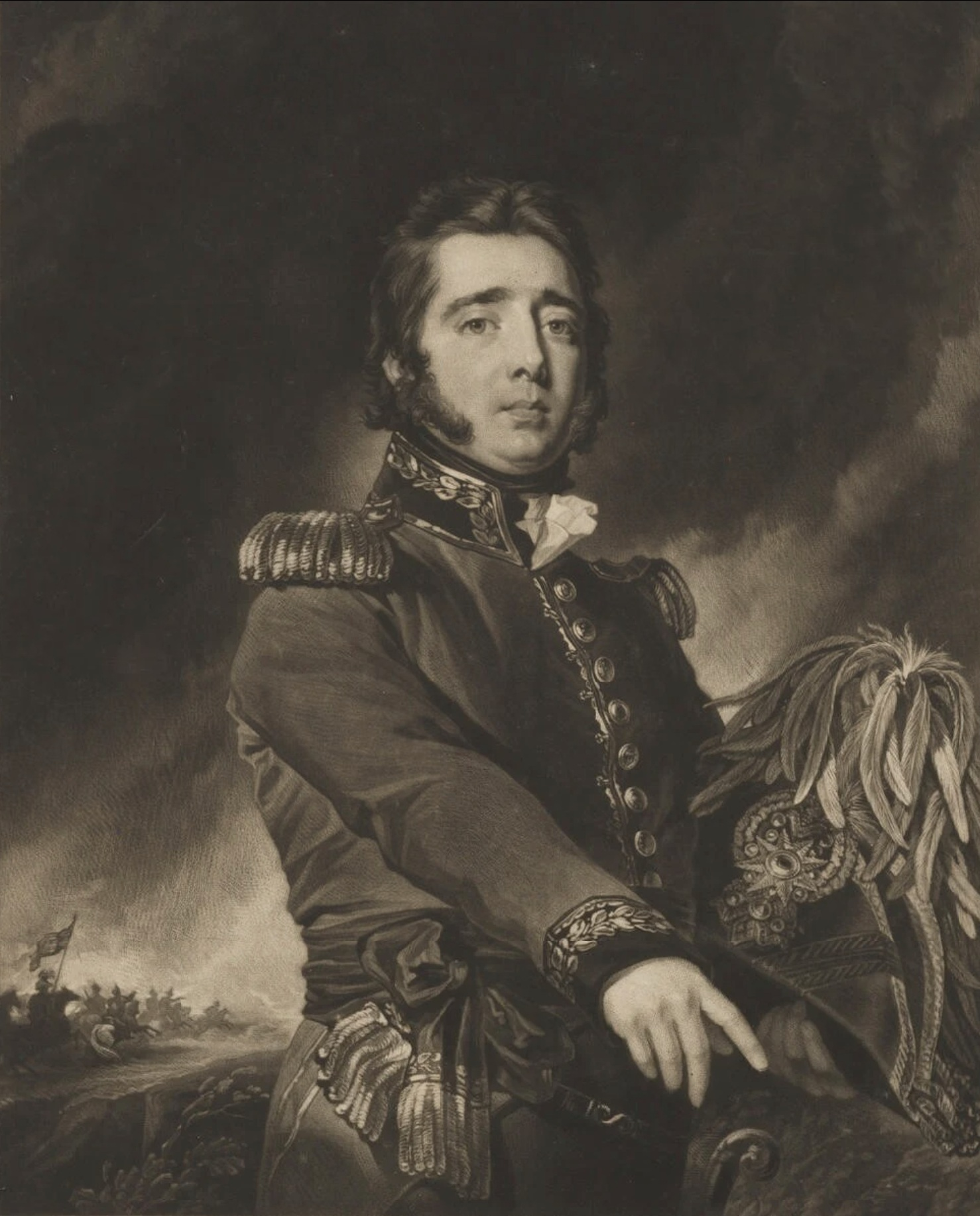
c. 1820–1835 portrait of MacGregor as a New Granadan general

MacGregor said that he had come to London to attend King George IV's coronation on the Poyers' behalf, and to seek investment and immigrants for Poyais. He claimed to have inherited a democratic system of government there, with a basic civil service and military. To those interested MacGregor showed what he said was a copy of a printed proclamation he had issued to the Poyers on 13 April 1821. He therein announced the 1820 land grant, his departure for Europe to seek investors and colonists—"religious and moral instructors ... and persons to guide and assist you"—and the appointment of Brigadier-General George Woodbine to be "Vice-Cazique" during his absence. "POYERS!", the document concluded, "I now bid you farewell for a while ... I trust, that through the kindness of Almighty Providence, I shall be again enabled to return amongst you, and that then it will be my pleasing duty to hail you as affectionate friends, and yours to receive me as your faithful Cazique and Father." There is no evidence that such a statement was ever actually distributed on the Mosquito Coast. (Note: This so-called "copy" was probably an original, printed in Britain long after the claimed date.)

So began the Poyais scheme. (Note: Sinclair calls the Poyais scheme "the most audacious fraud in history", while a 2012 analysis by The Economist adjudges it "the greatest confidence trick of all time". "It is true that more recent scams have raised more," the Economist's reasoning goes — "Bernie Madoff, a New York-based fraudster caught out in 2008 ran a scheme 20 times bigger, at $65 billion. In cash terms alone Mr Madoff trumps MacGregor. But fraud is about creating false confidence, and making people believe in something that does not exist. For some, like Mr Madoff, it is the belief in the trickster’s shamanic stock-picking skills. For others, like Charles Ponzi, it is a fail-safe mathematical scheme. MacGregor was far more ambitious: he invented an entire country.") MacGregor devised a tricameral parliament and other convoluted constitutional arrangements for Poyais, drew up commercial and banking mechanisms, and designed distinctive uniforms for each regiment of the Poyaisian Army. His imaginary country had an honours system, landed titles, a coat of arms—doubly supported by Poyers and unicorns—and the same Green Cross flag he had used in Florida. By the end of 1821, Major William John Richardson had not only accepted MacGregor's fantasy as true but had become an active ally, providing his attractive estate at Oak Hall, Wanstead to be a British base for the supposed Poyaisian royal family. MacGregor gave Richardson the Order of the Green Cross, commissioned him into the Poyaisian "Royal Regiment of Horse Guards" and appointed him chargé d'affaires of the Poyaisian legation at Dowgate Hill in the City of London—the top representative of Poyais in Britain. Richardson's letter of credence from "Gregor the First, Sovereign Prince of the State of Poyais" was presented to George IV. MacGregor had Poyaisian offices set up in London, Edinburgh and Glasgow to sell impressive-looking land certificates—initially hand-written, but later printed—to the general public, and to co-ordinate prospective emigrants.

=== Land of opportunity ===
The consensus among MacGregor's biographers is that Britain in the early 1820s could hardly have suited him and his Poyais scheme better. Amid a general growth in the British economy following the Battle of Waterloo and the end of the Napoleonic Wars, interest rates were dropping and the British government bond, the "consol", offered rates of only 3% per annum on the London Stock Exchange. Those wanting a higher return invested in more risky foreign debt. After continental European bonds were popular in the immediate post-Waterloo years, the Latin American revolutions brought a raft of new alternatives to the London market, starting with the £2 million loan issued for Gran Colombia (incorporating both New Granada and Venezuela) in March 1822. Bonds from Colombia, Peru, Chile and others, offering interest rates as high as 6% per annum, made Latin American securities extremely popular on the London market—a trend on which a nation like the Poyais described by MacGregor would be ideally positioned to capitalise.

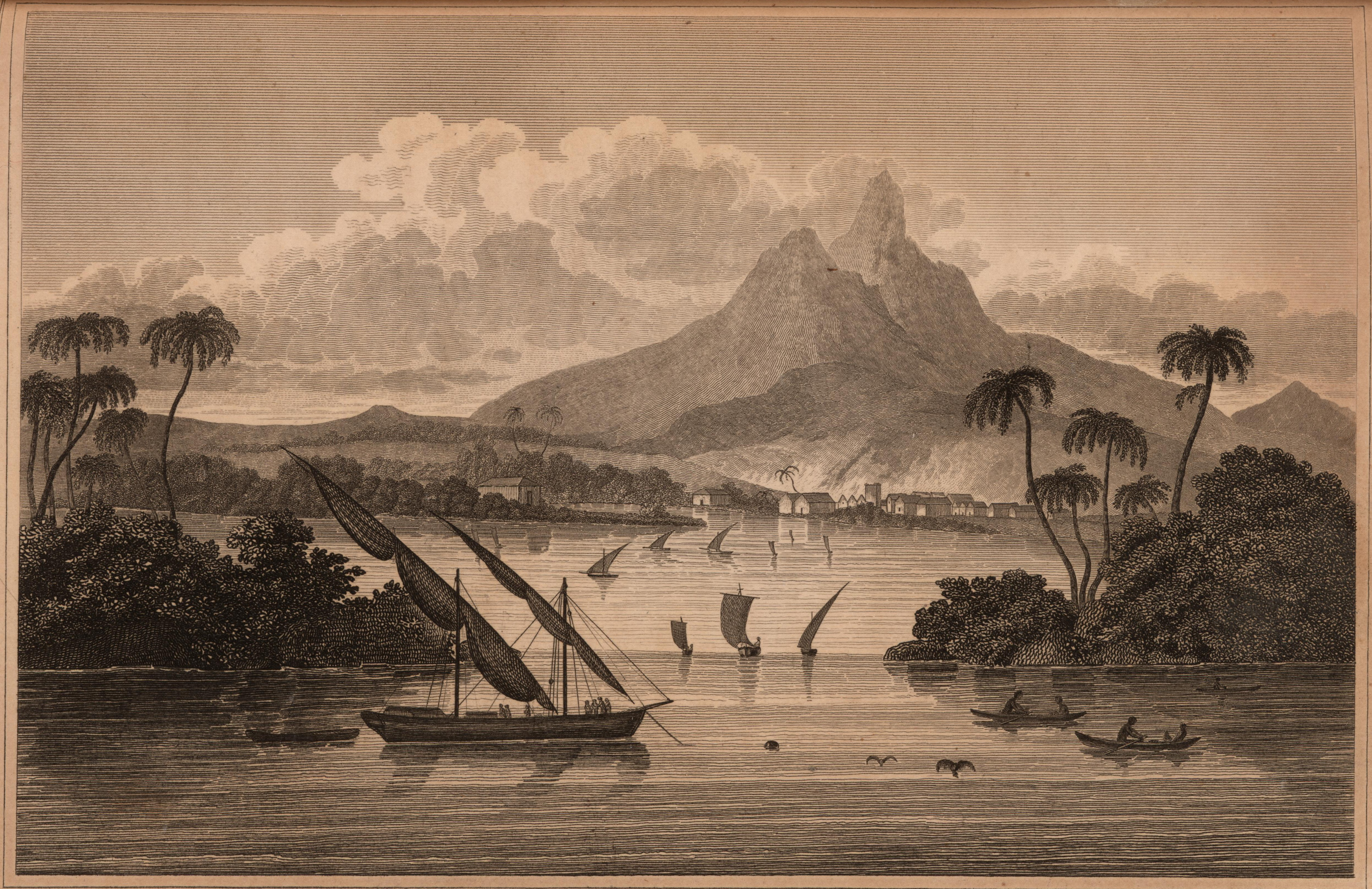
An engraving from Sketch of the Mosquito Shore, purporting to depict the "port of Black River in the Territory of Poyais"

MacGregor mounted an aggressive sales campaign. He gave interviews in the national newspapers, engaged publicists to write advertisements and leaflets, and had Poyais-related ballads composed and sung on the streets of London, Edinburgh and Glasgow. His proclamation to the Poyers was distributed in handbill form.

In mid-1822, there appeared in Edinburgh and London a 355-page guidebook "chiefly intended for the use of settlers", Sketch of the Mosquito Shore, Including the Territory of Poyais—ostensibly the work of a "Captain Thomas Strangeways", aide-de-camp to the Cazique, but actually written either by MacGregor himself or by accomplices. (Note: It is unclear whether Strangeways was a real person or another of MacGregor's inventions. The 1825 Army List records a Thomas Strangeways as a captain in the 9th Royal Veteran Battalion, with rank dating back to 6 April 1809, but it is not clear if there is a connection. Sinclair proposes that MacGregor may have appropriated the name from a person unrelated to the fraud, or invented the surname "Strangeways" as a joke on his victims.)

The Sketch mostly comprised long, reprinted tracts from older works on the Mosquito Coast and other parts of the region. The original material ranged from misleading to outright made up. MacGregor's publicists described the Poyaisian climate as "remarkably healthy ... agree[ing] admirably with the constitution of Europeans"—it was supposedly a spa destination for sick colonists from the Caribbean. The soil was so fertile that a farmer could have three maize harvests a year, or grow cash crops such as sugar or tobacco without hardship; detailed projections at the Sketch's end forecast profits of millions of dollars. Fish and game were so plentiful that a man could hunt or fish for a single day and bring back enough to feed his family for a week. The natives were not just co-operative but intensely pro-British. The capital was St Joseph, a flourishing seaside town of wide paved boulevards, colonnaded buildings and mansions, inhabited by as many as 20,000. St Joseph had a theatre, an opera house and a domed cathedral; there was also the Bank of Poyais, the Poyaisian houses of parliament and a royal palace. Reference was made to a "projected Hebrew colony". The Sketch went so far as to claim the rivers of Poyais contained "globules of pure gold".

The Poyais Emigrant

We'll a' gang to Poyais thegither,
We'll a' gang ower the seas thegither,
To fairer lands and brighter skies,
Nor sigh again for Hieland heather.

— Chorus of "The Poyais Emigrant", one of the ballads composed to advertise Poyais

This was almost all fiction, but MacGregor's calculation that official-looking documents and the printed word would convince many people proved correct. The meticulous detail in the leather-bound Sketch, and the cost of having it printed, did much to dispel lingering doubts. Poyaisian land certificates at two shillings and threepence per acre, roughly equivalent to a working man's daily wage at the time, were perceived by many as an attractive investment opportunity. (Note: Until the pound sterling was decimalised in 1971, each pound was made up of 240 pence, with 12 pence in a shilling and 20 shillings in a pound.) There was enough demand for the certificates that MacGregor was able to raise the price to two shillings and sixpence per acre in July 1822, then gradually to four shillings per acre, without diminishing sales; according to MacGregor, about 500 had bought Poyaisian land by early 1823. The buyers included many who invested their life savings. MacGregor became, to quote one 21st-century financial analyst, the "founding father of securities fraud".

Alongside the land certificate sales, MacGregor spent several months organising the issue of a Poyaisian government loan on the London Stock Exchange. As a precursor to this he registered his 1820 land grant at the Court of Chancery on 14 October 1822. Sir John Perring, Shaw, Barber & Co., a London bank with a fine reputation, underwrote a £200,000 loan—secured on "all the revenues of the Government of Poyais" including the sale of land—and offered provisional certificates or "scrip" for the Poyaisian bonds on 23 October. The bonds were in denominations of £100, £200 and £500, and offered at a marked-down purchase price of 80%. The certificate could be acquired for 15%, with the rest due over two installments on 17 January and 14 February 1823. The interest rate was 6% per annum. (Note: The bonds were due to mature in 1852.) If the Poyaisian issue successfully emulated its Colombian, Peruvian and Chilean counterparts, MacGregor stood to amass a fortune.

=== Eager settlers ===
For settlers, MacGregor deliberately targeted his fellow Scots, assuming that they would be more likely to trust him, as a Scotsman himself. Their emigration served to reassure potential investors in the Poyaisian bonds and land certificates firstly that the country was real, and secondly that it was being developed and would provide monetary returns. In Sinclair's assessment, this aspect of the scheme "turn[ed] what would have been an inspired hoax into a cruel and deadly one". Tamar Frankel posits in her analysis that, at least to some degree, MacGregor "probably believed his own story" and genuinely hoped to forge these people into a Poyaisian society. (Note: Sinclair suggests that the Cazique either was "seduced by his own pretensions" and self-removed from reality while perpetrating the fraud, or simply did not care what happened to the emigrants.) MacGregor told his would-be colonists that he wished to see Poyais populated with Scots as they possessed the necessary hardiness and character to develop the new country. Alluding to the rivalry with England and the Darien episode—which, he stressed, had involved a direct ancestor of his—MacGregor suggested that in Poyais they might right this historic wrong and salvage Scottish pride. Skilled tradesmen and artisans were promised free passage to Poyais, supplies, and lucrative government contracts. Hundreds, mostly Scots, signed up to emigrate—enough to fill seven ships. They included a City of London banker named Mauger (who was to head the Bank of Poyais), doctors, civil servants, young men whose families had bought them commissions in the Poyaisian Army and Navy, and an Edinburgh cobbler who accepted the post of Official Shoemaker to the Princess of Poyais.

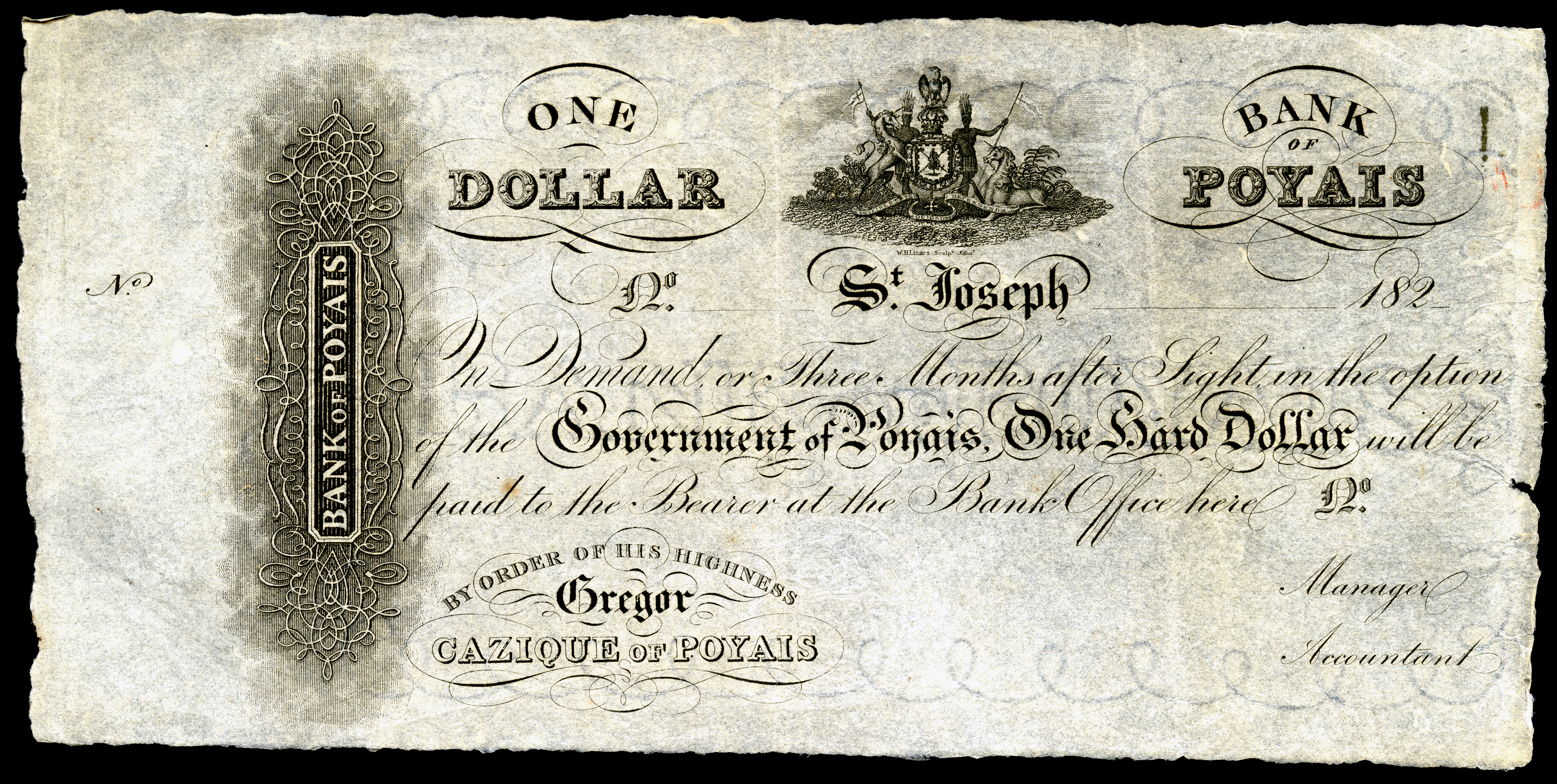
A Bank of Poyais "dollar", printed in Scotland. MacGregor bartered these worthless notes to his would-be settlers, taking their real British money in exchange.

Leadership of the Cazique's first emigration party was given to an ex-British Army officer, Hector Hall, who was commissioned into the Poyaisian "2nd Native Regiment of Foot" with the rank of lieutenant-colonel, and created "Baron Tinto" with a supposed 12,800-acre (20-square-mile; 52-square-kilometre) estate. Hall would sail with 70 emigrants on Honduras Packet, a vessel MacGregor had encountered in South America. MacGregor saw them off from London on 10 September 1822, entrusting to Mauger 5,000 Bank of Poyais dollar notes produced by the Bank of Scotland's official printer. "The new world of their dreams suddenly became a very real world as the men accepted the Cazique's dollar notes," Sinclair writes. "The people who had bought land, and who had planned to take their savings with them in coin, were also delighted to exchange their gold for the legal currency of Poyais." After MacGregor spoke briefly to each of the settlers to wish them luck, he and Hall exchanged salutes and the Honduras Packet set sail, flying the Green Cross flag.

A second emigrant ship—Kennersley Castle, a merchantman docked at Leith, near Edinburgh—was hired by MacGregor in October 1822, and left Leith on 22 January 1823 with almost 200 emigrants aboard. MacGregor again saw the settlers off, coming aboard to see that they were well quartered; to their delight, he announced that since this was the maiden emigrant voyage from Scotland to Poyais, all the women and children would sail free of charge. The Cazique was rowed back to shore to rousing cheers from his colonists. The ship's captain Henry Crouch fired a six-gun broadside salute, hoisted the supposed flag of Poyais, then steered the ship out of port.

While claiming royal status as Cazique, MacGregor attempted to dissociate himself from the Latin American republican movement and his former comrades there, and from late 1822 made discreet overtures towards the Spanish government regarding co-operation in Central America. The Spanish paid him little notice. The Poyaisian bonds' price remained fairly steady until they were crippled by developments elsewhere in the market during November and December 1822. Amid the general instability in South America, the Colombian government suggested that its London agent might have exceeded his authority when he arranged the £2 million loan. When this representative suddenly died, the frantic buying of South American securities was abruptly replaced by equally restless selling. The Cazique's cash flow was all but wiped out when most of those who had bought the Poyaisian scrip did not make the payments due in January. While the price of the Colombian bonds steadied and eventually rose again, the Poyaisian securities never recovered; by late 1823 they were traded for less than 10% of their face value. (Note: MacGregor had thus far grossed about £50,000. A scathing review of the Sketch, entitled "The Poyais Bubble", was published in Volume XXVIII of the Quarterly Review in February 1823. The author debunked Poyais as a fabrication, identified earlier works reprinted wholesale in the Sketch, and warned investors not to be fooled. A correspondent identified only as "Verax" replied with an open "Letter to the Editor of the Quarterly Review", in which he corroborated the Sketch's claims regarding Poyais and the fertility of its soil, and asserted that the author of "The Poyais Bubble" had greatly misunderstood MacGregor. MacGregor floated a second £200,000 Poyais loan in early October 1823, again with Sir John Perring underwriting the issue, but failed to sell many bonds.)

=== Disappointment ===
Honduras Packet reached the Black River in November 1822. Bemused to find a country rather different from the Sketch's descriptions, and no sign of St Joseph, the emigrants set up camp on the shore, assuming that the Poyaisian authorities would soon contact them. They sent numerous search parties inland; one, guided by natives who recognised the name St Joseph, found some long-forgotten foundations and rubble. (Note: St Joseph had been a real place in the Black River settlement of the 18th century, but had never reached anything close to the level of development described by MacGregor's publicity material.) Hall quickly came to the private conclusion that MacGregor must have duped them, but reasoned that announcing such concerns prematurely would only demoralise the party and cause chaos. A few weeks after their arrival, the captain of the Honduras Packet abruptly and unilaterally sailed away amid a fierce storm; the emigrants found themselves alone apart from the natives and two American hermits. (Note: Honduras Packet had remained anchored off the mouth of the river as the emigrants gradually unloaded their supplies. Some of the provisions and medicines were still in the hold when the ship sailed away; she did not return.) Comforting the settlers with vague assurances that the Poyaisian government would find them if they just stayed where they were, Hall set out for Cape Gracias a Dios, hoping to make contact with the Mosquito king or find another ship. Most of the emigrants found it impossible to believe that the Cazique had deliberately misled them, and posited that blame must lie elsewhere, or that there must have been some terrible misunderstanding.

... disease seized upon them and spread rapidly. Lack of proper food and water, and failure to take the requisite sanitary precautions, brought on intermittent fever and dysentery. ... Whole families were ill. Most of the sufferers lay on the ground without other protection from the sun and rain than a few leaves and branches thrown across some sticks. Many were so weak as to be unable to crawl to the woods for the common offices of nature. The stench arising from the filth they were in was unendurable.

— The Poyais emigrants' situation, as described by Alfred Hasbrouck in 1927

The second set of colonists disembarked from the Kennersley Castle in late March 1823. Their optimism was quickly extinguished. Hall returned in April with disheartening news: he had found no ship that could help and, far from considering them any responsibility of his, King George Frederic Augustus had not even been aware of their presence. The Kennersley Castle having sailed, MacGregor's victims could count on no assistance in the near future. The emigrants had brought ample provisions with them, including medicines, and had two doctors among them, so they were not in a totally hopeless situation, but apart from Hall none of the military officers, government officials or civil servants appointed by MacGregor made any serious attempt to organise the party.

Hall returned to Cape Gracias a Dios several times to seek help, but did not explain his constant absences to the settlers—this exacerbated the general confusion and anger, particularly when he refused to pay the wages promised to those supposedly on Poyaisian government contracts. With the coming of the rainy season insects infested the camp, diseases such as malaria and yellow fever took hold, and the emigrants sank into utter despair. James Hastie, a Scottish sawyer who had brought his wife and three children with him, later wrote: "It seemed to be the will of Providence that every circumstance should combine for our destruction." Another settler, the would-be royal shoemaker, who had left a family in Edinburgh, shot himself. (Note: Separately from Hall, a small group of settlers attempted to reach British Honduras, about 500 nautical miles (930 km; 580 mi) to the north-west, in canoes. The flimsy vessels they built almost immediately foundered, and one man drowned.)

The schooner Mexican Eagle, from British Honduras carrying the Chief Magistrate of Belize, Marshal Bennet, to the Mosquito king's court, discovered the settlers in early May 1823. Seven men and three children had died, and many more were sick. Bennet informed them that Poyais did not exist and that he had never heard of this Cazique they spoke of. He advised them to return with him to British Honduras, as they would surely die if they stayed where they were. The majority preferred to wait for Hall to come back, hopefully with news of passage back to Britain. About half a week later Hall returned with the Mosquito king, who announced that MacGregor's land grant was revoked forthwith. He had never granted MacGregor the title of Cazique, he said, nor given him the right to sell land or raise loans against it; the emigrants were in fact in George Frederic Augustus's territory illegally and would have to leave unless they pledged allegiance to him. All the settlers left except for about 40 who were too weakened by disease to make the journey.

Transported aboard the cramped Mexican Eagle—the lack of space necessitated three trips—the emigrants were in miserable shape when they reached Belize, and in most cases had to be carried from the ship. The weather in British Honduras was even worse than that at the Black River, and the colony's authorities and doctors could do little to help the new arrivals. Disease spread rapidly among the settlers and most of them died. The colony's superintendent, Major-General Edward Codd, opened an official investigation to "lay open the true situation of the imaginary State of Poyais and ... the unfortunate emigrants", and sent word to Britain of the Poyais settlers' fate. By the time the warning reached London, MacGregor had five more emigrant ships on the way; the Royal Navy intercepted them. A third vessel—Skene, carrying 105 more Scottish emigrants—arrived at the Black River, but on seeing the abandoned colony the master Captain John Wilson sailed on to Belize and disembarked his passengers there. The fourth and last ship to arrive was Albion, which arrived at Belize in November 1823, but which was carrying provisions, arms, and stores and not passengers. The cargo was sold locally at auction. The surviving colonists variously settled in the United States, remained in British Honduras, or sailed for home aboard the Ocean, a British vessel that left Belize on 1 August 1823. Some died during the journey back across the Atlantic. Of the roughly 250 who had sailed on Honduras Packet and Kennersley Castle, at least 180 had perished. Fewer than 50 ever returned to Britain.

=== Poyais scheme in France ===
MacGregor left London shortly before the small party of Poyais survivors arrived home on 12 October 1823—he told Richardson that he was taking Josefa to winter in Italy for the sake of her health, but in fact his destination was Paris. The London press reported extensively on the Poyais scandal over the following weeks and months, stressing the colonists' travails and charging that MacGregor had orchestrated a massive fraud. (Note: The commentators included Theodore Hook, who lampooned the affair in John Bull with a song called "The Court of Poyais", supposedly "by the Poyaisian poet laureate". The first verse included the lyrics "A Prince or Cacique / Springs up like a leek; / Protectors and Presidents sprout every week." The refrain went: "Then a fig for King George and his old-fashioned sway! / And hey for MacGregor, Cacique of Poyais!!") Six of the survivors—including Hastie, who had lost two of his children during the ordeal—claimed that they were misquoted in these articles, and on 22 October signed an affidavit insisting that blame lay not with MacGregor but with Hall and other members of the emigrant party. "[W]e believe that Sir Gregor MacGregor has been worse used by Colonel Hall and his other agents than was ever a man before", they declared, "and that had they have done their duty by Sir Gregor and by us, things would have turned out very differently at Poyais". MacGregor asserted that he himself had been defrauded, alleged embezzlement by some of his agents, and claimed that covetous merchants in British Honduras were deliberately undermining the development of Poyais as it threatened their profits. Richardson attempted to console the Poyais survivors, vigorously denied the press claims that the country did not exist, and issued libel writs against some of the British newspapers on MacGregor's behalf. (Note: Hastie, who returned to Scotland, went so far in his vociferous defence of MacGregor that he published a memoir of Poyais in which he repeatedly stated that the general was not to blame in any way.)

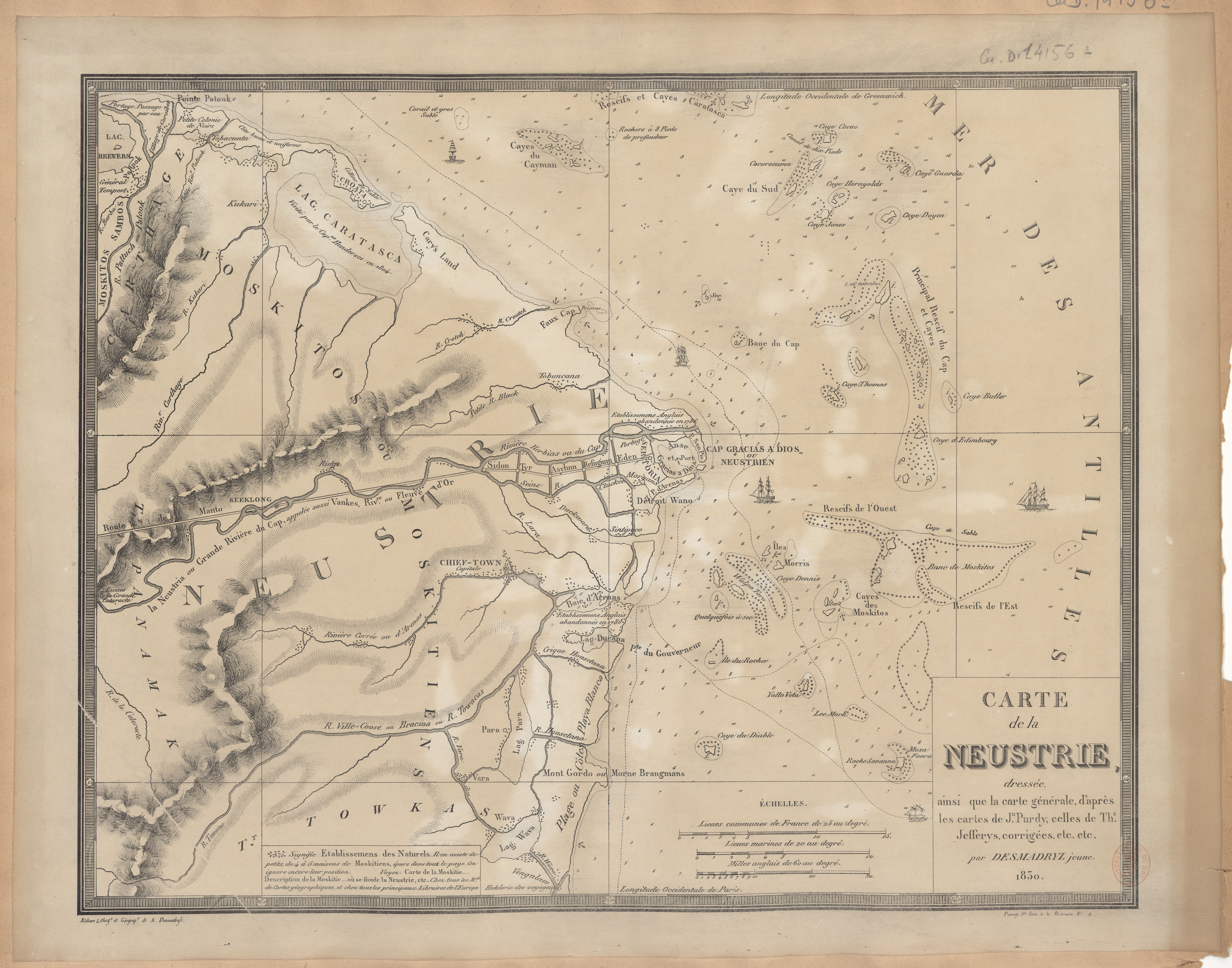
Carte de la Neustrie showing the (fictional) towns of Sidon, Tyr, Asylum, Refugium, Eden and Sertoria

In Paris, MacGregor persuaded the Compagnie de la Nouvelle Neustrie, a firm of traders that aspired to prominence in South America, to seek investors and settlers for Poyais in France. He concurrently intensified his efforts towards King Ferdinand VII of Spain—in a November 1823 letter the Cazique proposed to make Poyais a Spanish protectorate. Four months later he offered to lead a Spanish campaign to reconquer Guatemala, using Poyais as a base. Spain took no action. MacGregor's "moment of greatest hubris", Matthew Brown suggests in his biographical portrait, came in December 1824 when, in a letter to the King of Spain, he claimed to be himself "descendent of the ancient Kings of Scotland". Around this time Josefa gave birth to the third and final MacGregor child, Constantino, at their home in the Champs-Élysées. Gustavus Butler Hippisley, a friend of Major Richardson and fellow veteran of the British Legions in Latin America, accepted the Poyais fantasy as true and entered MacGregor's employ in March 1825. Hippisley wrote back to Britain refuting "the bare-faced calumnies of a hireling press"; in particular he admonished a journalist who had called MacGregor a "penniless adventurer". With Hippisley's help, MacGregor negotiated with the Nouvelle Neustrie company, whose managing director was a Frenchman called Lehuby, and agreed to sell the French company up to 500,000 acres (781 square miles; 2,023 square kilometres) in Poyais for its own settlement scheme; "a very clever way of distancing himself", Sinclair comments, as this time he would be able to say honestly that others were responsible and that he had merely made the land available.

Lehuby's company readied a ship at Le Havre and began to gather French emigrants, of whom about 30 obtained passports to travel to Poyais. Discarding the idea of co-operation with Spain, MacGregor published a new Poyaisian constitution in Paris in August 1825, this time describing it as a republic—he remained head of state, with the title Cazique—and on 18 August raised a new £300,000 loan through Thomas Jenkins & Company, an obscure London bank, offering 2.5% interest per annum. No evidence survives to suggest that the relevant bonds were issued. The Sketch was condensed and republished as a 40-page booklet called Some Account of the Poyais Country. French government officials became suspicious when an additional 30 people requested passports to travel to this country they had never heard of, and ordered the Nouvelle Neustrie company's ship to be kept in port. Some of the would-be emigrants became concerned themselves and made complaints to the police, which led to the arrest of Hippisley and MacGregor's secretary Thomas Irving in Paris in the early hours on 4 September 1825. Lehuby's ship never left Le Havre, and his colonists gradually dispersed.

=== 1826 acquittal of fraud ===
MacGregor went into hiding in the French provinces, while Lehuby fled to the southern Netherlands. Hippisley and Irving were informed on 6 September that they were being investigated for conspiracy to defraud and sell titles to land they did not own. Both insisted that they were innocent. They were taken that evening to La Force Prison.

MacGregor was arrested after three months and brought to La Force on 7 December 1825. He speculated to his confederates that the charges against them must be the result of some abrupt change of policy by France, or of some Spanish intrigue calculated to undermine Poyaisian independence. The three men remained imprisoned without trial while the French attempted to extradite Lehuby from the Netherlands. Attempting to re-associate himself and Poyais with the republican movement in Latin America, MacGregor issued a French-language declaration from his prison cell on 10 January 1826, claiming that he was "contrary to human rights, held prisoner ... for reasons of which he is not aware" and "suffering as one of the founders of independence in the New World". (Note: MacGregor expressed hope that this statement might be presented at the upcoming congress of the new republics in Panama. It concluded with an announcement that Poyais was hereby under the provisional protection of the United Provinces of Central America.) This attempt to convince the French that he might have some kind of diplomatic immunity did not work. The French government and police ignored the announcement.

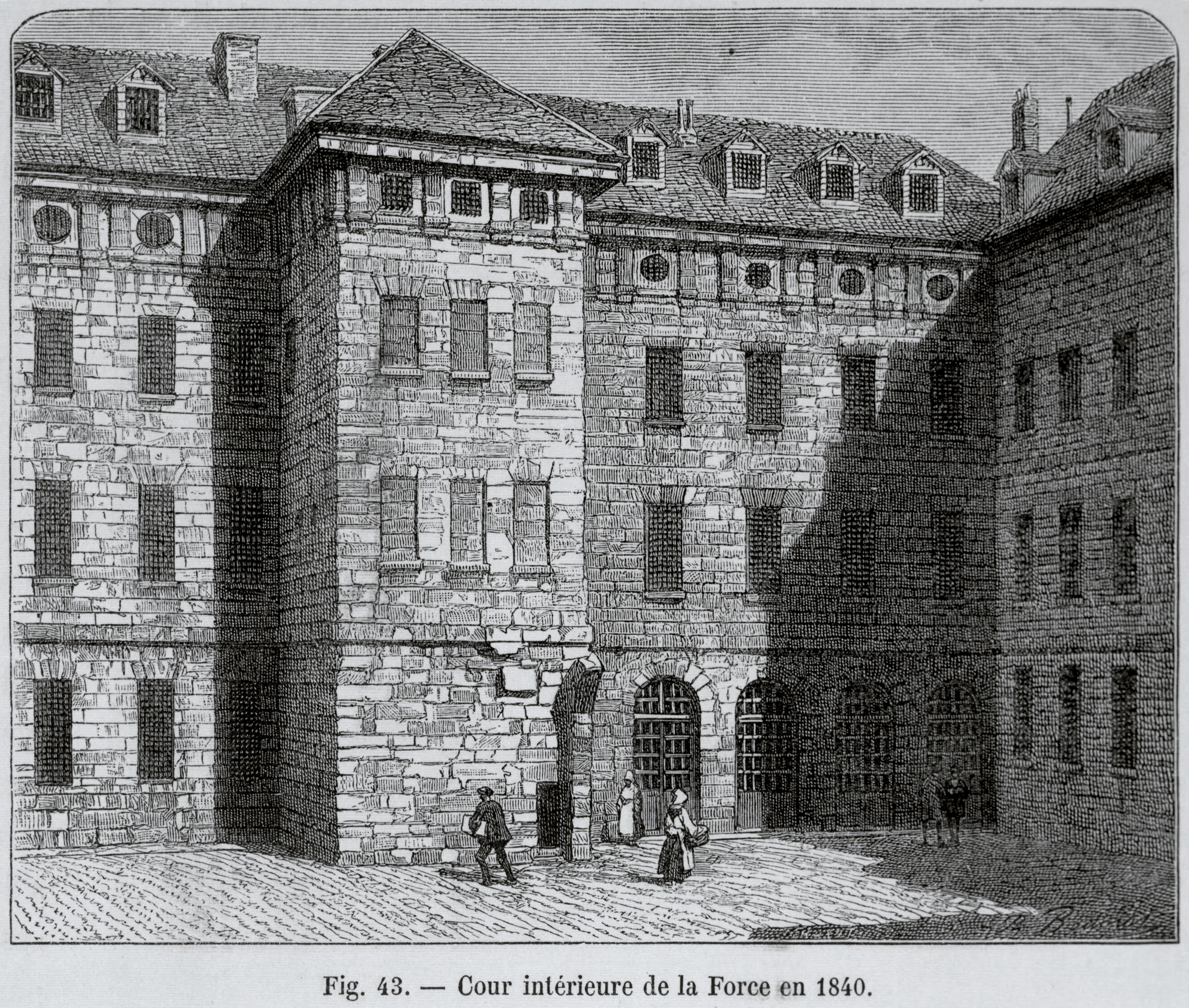
La Force Prison in Paris, where MacGregor was detained from December 1825 to July 1826, before his trial and acquittal

The three Britons were brought to trial on 6 April 1826. Lehuby, still in the Netherlands, was tried in absentia. The Crown prosecution's case was seriously hampered by his absence, particularly because many key documents were with him in the Netherlands. The prosecutor alleged a complex conspiracy between MacGregor, Lehuby and their associates to profit personally from a fraudulent land concession and loan prospectus. MacGregor's lawyer, a Frenchman called Merilhou, asserted that if anything untoward had occurred, the missing managing director should be held culpable; there was no proof of a conspiracy, he said, and MacGregor could have been himself defrauded by Lehuby. The prosecutor conceded that there was insufficient evidence to prove his case, complimented MacGregor for co-operating with the investigation fairly and openly, and withdrew the charges. The three judges confirmed the defendants' release—"a full and perfect acquittal", Hippisley would write—but days later the French authorities succeeded in having Lehuby extradited, and the three men learned they would have to stand trial again.

The fresh trial, scheduled for 20 May, was postponed when the prosecutor announced that he was not ready. The delay gave MacGregor and Merilhou time to prepare an elaborate, largely fictional 5,000-word statement purporting to describe the Scotsman's background, activities in the Americas, and total innocence of any endeavour to defraud. When the trial finally began on 10 July 1826, Merilhou was present not as MacGregor's defence counsel but as a witness for the prosecution, having been called as such because of his links with the Nouvelle Neustrie company.

Merilhou entrusted MacGregor's defence to a colleague called Berville, who read the 5,000-word submission in full before the court. "Maître Merilhou, as the author of the address the court had heard, and Maître Berville, as the actor who read the script, had done their work extremely well," Sinclair writes; Lehuby was convicted of making false representations regarding the sale of shares, and sentenced to 13 months' imprisonment, but the Cazique was found not guilty on all charges, while the imputations against Hippisley and Irving were stricken from the record.

=== Return to Britain; lesser Poyais schemes ===
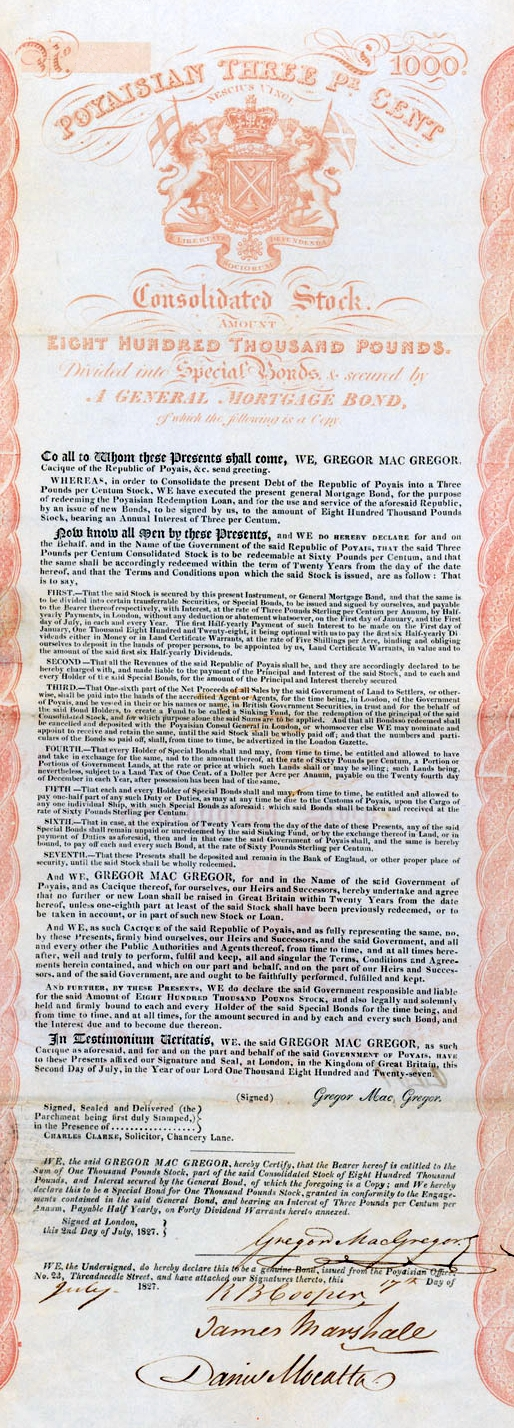
One of the bonds issued for the £800,000 Poyaisian loan in 1827

MacGregor quickly moved his family back to London, where the furore following the Poyais survivors' return had died down. In the midst of a serious economic downturn, some investors had subscribed to the £300,000 Poyais loan issued by Thomas Jenkins & Company—apparently believing the assertion of the Cazique's publicists that the previous loans had defaulted only because of embezzlement by one of his agents. MacGregor was arrested soon after his arrival back in Britain, and held at Tothill Fields Bridewell in Westminster for about a week before being released without charge. (Note: It is unclear on what grounds he was detained; no formal charges were brought. Sinclair suggests that his arrest was probably over outstanding debts, and that his quick release may be simply because was able to pay these off.) He initiated a new, less ornate version of the Poyais scheme, describing himself simply as the "Cacique of the Republic of Poyais". (Note: "Cacique" was the French spelling of "Cazique". The slight change in nomenclature does not seem to have been significant.) The new Poyaisian office at 23 Threadneedle Street made none of the claims to diplomatic status the old Poyaisian legation at Dowgate Hill had done.

MacGregor persuaded Thomas Jenkins & Company to act as brokers for an £800,000 loan, issued on 20-year bonds at 3% interest, in mid-1827. The bonds, produced at nominal values of £250, £500 and £1,000, did not become popular. An anonymous handbill was circulated in the City of London, describing the previous Poyais loans and warning readers to "Take Care of your Pockets—Another Poyais Humbug". The loan's poor performance compelled MacGregor to pass most of the unsold certificates to a consortium of speculators for a small sum. Sinclair stresses that the Poyais bonds were perceived as "humbug" not because MacGregor's hoax had been fully unravelled, but simply because the prior securities had failed to deliver profitable returns. "Nobody thought to question the legitimacy of Poyais itself", he elaborates. "Some investors had begun to understand that they were being fleeced, but almost none realised how comprehensively."

Other variants on the Poyais scheme were similarly unsuccessful. In 1828, MacGregor began to sell certificates entitling the holders to "land in Poyais Proper" at five shillings per acre. Two years later King Robert Charles Frederic, who had succeeded his brother George Frederic Augustus in 1824, issued thousands of certificates covering the same territory and offered them to lumber companies in London, directly competing with MacGregor. When the original investors demanded their long-overdue interest, MacGregor could only pay with more certificates. Other charlatans soon caught on and set up their own rival "Poyaisian offices" in London, offering land debentures in competition with both MacGregor and the Mosquito king. By 1834 MacGregor was back in Scotland and living in Edinburgh. He paid some unredeemed securities by issuing yet another series of Poyaisian land certificates. Two years later he published a constitution for a smaller Poyaisian republic, centred on the region surrounding the Black River, and headed by himself as president. It was clear, however, that "Poyais had had its day", as Sinclair puts it. An attempt by MacGregor to sell some land certificates in 1837 marks the last record of any Poyais scheme. (Note: Including all iterations of the Poyais fraud, MacGregor issued certificates covering at least half of the 8 million acres covered by the 1820 land grant. King Robert Charles Frederic produced enough documents to sell the same land several times over.)

== Return to Venezuela and death ==
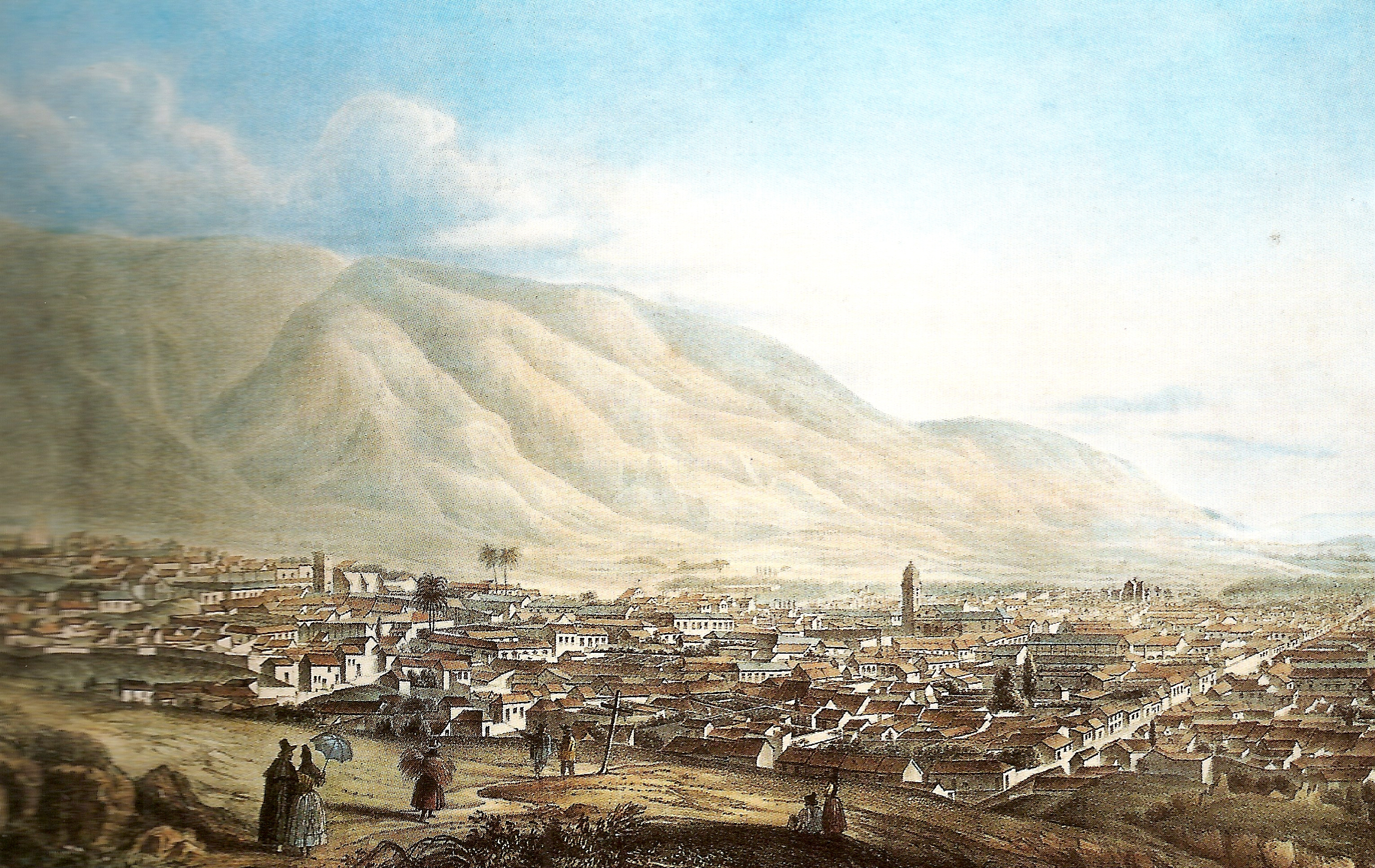
Caracas, where MacGregor spent his last years, as painted by Joseph Thomas in 1839

Josefa MacGregor died at Burghmuirhead, near Edinburgh, on 4 May 1838. MacGregor almost immediately left for Venezuela, where he resettled in Caracas and in October 1838 applied for citizenship and restoration to his former rank in the Venezuelan Army, with back pay and a pension. He stressed his travails on Venezuela's behalf two decades earlier and asserted that Bolívar, who had died in 1830, had effectively deported him; he described several unsuccessful requests to return and being "[forced to] remain outside the Republic ... by causes and obstacles out of my control" while losing his wife, two children and "the best years of my life and all my fortune". (Note: MacGregor's children seem to have stayed in Scotland. His daughter Josefa died there in 1872 leaving two sons, neither of whom had children. No record survives regarding what became of Gregorio and Constantino MacGregor.)

The Defence Minister Rafael Urdaneta, who had served alongside MacGregor during the Aux Cayes expedition of 1816, asked the Senate to look upon the Scotsman's application favourably as he had "enlisted in our ranks from the very start of the War of Independence, and ran the same risks as all the patriots of that disastrous time, meriting promotions and respect because of his excellent personal conduct"—MacGregor's contributions had been "heroic with immense results". President José Antonio Páez, another former revolutionary comrade, approved the application in March 1839.

MacGregor was duly confirmed as a Venezuelan citizen and divisional general in the Venezuelan Army, with a pension of one-third of his salary. He settled in the capital and became a respected member of the local community. After his death at home in Caracas on 4 December 1845, aged 58, he was buried with full military honours in Caracas Cathedral, with President Carlos Soublette, Cabinet ministers and the military chiefs of Venezuela marching behind his coffin. Obituaries in the Caracas press extolled General MacGregor's "heroic and triumphant retreat" to Barcelona in 1816 and described him as "a valiant champion of independence". "There was not a word about Amelia Island, Porto Bello or Rio de la Hacha, and there was no reference to the Cazique of Poyais", Sinclair concludes. The part of today's Honduras that was supposedly called Poyais remains undeveloped in the 21st century. Back in Scotland, at the MacGregor graveyard near Loch Katrine, the clan memorial stones make no mention of Gregor MacGregor or the country he invented.

== See also ==
- British Legions British and Irish volunteer legions in the South American wars for independence

== Notes and references ==
=== References ===
==== Newspapers, journals and letters ====
- Hasbrouck, Alfred (November 1927). "Gregor McGregor and the Colonization of Poyais, between 1820 and 1824". The Hispanic American Historical Review. 7 (4). Durham, North Carolina: Duke University Press: 438–459. doi:10.2307/2505996. JSTOR 2505996.
- "The Poyais Bubble". Quarterly Review (XXVIII). London: John Murray: 158–161. October 1822.
- Verax (1823). A Letter to the Editor of the Quarterly Review, etc. London: C and J Rivington.

==== Online ====
- Dawson, Frank Griffith (2004). "MacGregor, Gregor (1786–1845)". Oxford Dictionary of National Biography (online ed.). Oxford: Oxford University Press. doi:10.1093/ref:odnb/17519. (Subscription, Wikipedia Library access or UK public library membership required.)
- Taylor, Bryan (2013). "The Fraud of the Prince of Poyais on the London Stock Exchange" (PDF). San Juan Capistrano, California: Global Financial Data. Archived from the original (PDF) on 16 July 2015.
- "The King of Con-Men". The Economist (online ed.). London. 22 December 2012. Archived from the original on 16 May 2015.

==== Bibliography ====
- Barham, R H Dalton (1849). The Life and Remains of Theodore Edward Hook. Volume II. London: Richard Bentley. OCLC 1163344.
- Bennett, Charles E (2001). General MacGregor: Hero Or Rogue?. Jacksonville, Florida: River City Press. ISBN 978-0-9704987-2-4.
- Brown, Gordon S (2015). Latin American Rebels and the United States, 1806–1822 (First ed.). Jefferson, North Carolina: McFarland & Company. ISBN 978-0-7864-9899-4.
- Brown, Matthew (2006). "Gregor MacGregor: Clansman, Conquistador and Coloniser on the Fringes of the British Empire". In Lambert, David; Lester, Alan (eds.). Colonial Lives Across the British Empire: Imperial Careering in the Long Nineteenth Century (First ed.). Cambridge: Cambridge University Press. pp. 32–57. ISBN 978-0-521-84770-4.
- Bushnell, David (1986). "The Florida Republic: An Overview". In Bushnell, David (ed.). La República de las Floridas: Texts and Documents. Mexico City: Pan American Institute of Geography and History. pp. 8–18. OCLC 15520704.
- Codd, Edward (1824). Proceedings of an inquiry and investigation, instituted by Major General Codd, His Majesty's Superintendent and Commander-in-chief at Belize, Honduras, relative to Poyais. Lawler and Quick.
- Gregg, Richard T. (1999). Gregor MacGregor, Cazique of Poyais, 1786–1845...or, Gregor MacGregor: on the Trail of the Gullible!. London: International Bond & Share Society. ISBN 0-9511250-2-8.
- Harvey, Robert (2011). Bolivar: The Liberator of Latin America. New York City, New York: Skyhorse Publishing. ISBN 978-1-62087-663-3.
- Logan, W H (1869). A Pedlar's Pack of Ballads and Songs: With Illustrative Notes. Edinburgh: William Paterson. OCLC 5247923.
- Olson, James Stuart (1991). The Indians of Central and South America: An Ethnohistorical Dictionary (First ed.). Westport, Connecticut: Greenwood Press. ISBN 978-0-313-26387-3.
- Owsley Jr, Frank Lawrence; Smith, Gene A (1997). Filibusters and Expansionists: Jeffersonian Manifest Destiny, 1800–1821 (First ed.). Tuscaloosa, Alabama: Alabama University Press. ISBN 978-0-8173-0880-3.
- Naylor, Robert A (1989). Penny Ante Imperialism: The Mosquito Shore and the Bay of Honduras, 1600–1914: a Case Study in British Informal Empire. Teaneck, New Jersey: Fairleigh Dickinson University Press. ISBN 978-0-8386-3323-6.
- Norris, L David (1986). "Failure Unfolds: The Loss of Amelia Island". In Bushnell, David (ed.). La República de las Floridas: Texts and Documents. Mexico City: Pan American Institute of Geography and History. pp. 19–33. OCLC 15520704.
- Rafter, Michael (1820). Memoirs of Gregor M'Gregor: Comprising a Sketch of the Revolution in New Grenada and Venezuela, etc. London: J J Stockdale. OCLC 316532821.
- Robens, Erich; Jayaweera, Shanath Amarasiri A; Kiefer, Susanne (2014). Balances: Instruments, Manufacturers, History. Heidelberg: Springer. ISBN 978-3-642-36446-4.
- Rodriguez, Moises Enrique (2006). Freedom's Mercenaries: Northern South America. Falls Village, Connecticut: Hamilton Books. ISBN 978-0-7618-3437-3.
- Sinclair, David (2004) [2003]. The Land That Never Was: Sir Gregor MacGregor and the Most Audacious Fraud in History. Boston, Massachusetts: Da Capo Press. ISBN 978-0-306-81309-2.
- Straney, Louis L (2011). Securities Fraud: Detection, Prevention and Control. Hoboken, New Jersey: John Wiley & Sons. ISBN 978-0-470-91859-3.
- Strangeways, Thomas (1822). Sketch of the Mosquito Shore, Including the Territory of Poyais, etc. Edinburgh: William Blackwood. OCLC 1850212.
- Vittorino, Antonio (1990). Relaciones colombo-británicas de 1823 a 1825: según los documentos del Foreign Office. Barranquilla: Ediciones Uninorte. ISBN 978-958-9105-22-1.
- Westmacott, Charles Molloy, ed. (1825). The Spirit of the Public Journals, For the Year 1824, etc. London: Sherwood, Jones & Co. OCLC 862786520.
