= Albion (1800 Whitehaven ship) =

History

Great Britain
- Name: Albion
- Namesake: Albion
- Builder: Whitehaven
- Launched: 1800
- Fate: Wrecked 8 March 1824

General characteristics
- Tons burthen: 225 (bm)
- Propulsion: Sail

Albion was launched at Whitehaven and spent her entire career as a West Indiaman. She was the last vessel to sail under Gregor Macgregor's ill-conceived and ill-fated Poyais scheme. She delivered her cargo of stores for the colony to Belize in November 1823 and was wrecked, with no loss of life, off Cuba in March 1824 on her way home to England.

== Career ==
Albion first entered Lloyd's Register (LR) in 1821.

Year	Master	Owner	Trade	Notes and source
1801	W. Rey	O'Conner	Dublin–Jamaica	LR
1802	W.Key; Hayton	O'Conner	Dublin-Jamaica	LR
1802	T. Key	Conner & co.	Whitehaven-Jamaica	Register of Shipping
1805	Hayton	O'Conner	Cork	LR
1810	Homes	O'Conner	Dublin–Antigua	LR
1815	T. Holmes	Berkett & Co.	Cork	LR
1820	T. Holmes	T. Holmes	Dublin–Antigua	LR

Lloyd's List reported on 11 June 1816 that a letter from Demerara dated 13 April stated that Albion, Holmes, master, had been surveyed and found seaworthy. She had been bound from Demerara to Dublin. About 92 hogsheads of sugar had been landed much damaged and had been sold.

Lloyd's Register for 1824 showed Albion with B. Fisher, master and owner, and trade Workington–Honduras. She had undergone a good repair in 1823 and 1824.

Gregor Macgregor chartered Albion, Thomas Fisher, master, in 1823 to carry a cargo to the settlement of Poyais, on the Mosquito Coast, that he was promoting. She arrived there only to find the settlement abandoned and in November sailed on to Belize where she discharged her cargo, said to be worth £10,000. Testimony in a subsequent hearing about the disposal of the cargo showed that it included small arms and six 18-pounder and six 6-pounder guns, mounted on carriages, as well ammunition, food, and numerous other stores. The cargo had been over-valued on the invoices, and was sold at auction. There is no evidence that Albion carried any passengers.

== Fate ==
A letter dated 1 April 1824, at Havana, reported that Albion, Fisher, master, had wrecked during the night of 8 March at Cayo Blanco, on the leeward side of Cuba. The crew were saved, as were seven boxes of silver bars and dollars, 13 serons of indigo, and a barrel of tortoiseshell.
