= Hussaren (1808 ship) =

UK merchant ship (1808-1828)

History

United Kingdom
- Name: Housaren
- Namesake: Hussar
- Launched: 1801, Denmark, or France
- Renamed: Hussaren (1808)
- Fate: Wrecked 13 January 1828

General characteristics
- Tons burthen: 260, or 261, or 262 (bm)
- Length: 92 ft 3 in (28.1 m)
- Beam: 26 ft 0 in (7.9 m)
- Sail plan: Snow; later brig
- Complement: 20
- Armament: 1808: 10 × 6-pounder guns; 1809: 10 × 12-pounder carronades

Hussaren's origins are obscure. She was taken in prize in 1805, probably as Houseren, and renamed to Hussaren in 1808. She was wrecked in 1828.

== Career ==
The Prize Court condemned Hussaren on 16 December 1805, and she was then sold. One source states that she was built in France. However, she first appeared in Lloyd's Register (LR) in the volume for 1805 as the Danish vessel Houseren.

Year	Master	Owner	Trade	Source
1805	Arbohn	Nealsowl	Falmouth–Naples	LR

Lloyd's Register for 1809 had the first listing for Hussaren, while continuing the listing for Housaren. Houseren first appeared in the volume of the Register of Shipping (RS) for 1809 with the same information as that in Lloyd's Register. Both registers continued to carry the two names, with unchanging data, for some years.

Year	Master	Owner	Trade	Source
1809	M'Farlane	Miller & Co.	Greenock–St Thomas	LR

Captain John McFarlane acquired a letter of marque on 20 September 1808.

Lloyds List reported in October 1809 that Hussariun, M'Farlane, master, had come into Halifax, Nova Scotia in distress, having seven feet of water in her hold. She was on her way from the Clyde to St Thomas.

On 25 December 1810, Hussaren, M'Falane, master, was coming back to England from St Thomas when she ran on shore near Sheerness. She was got off with the loss of an anchor and cable, and her rudder. Once she had been supplied with replacements, she proceeded on to the Thames.

Year	Master	Owner	Trade	Source & notes
1811	M'Farlane; Wools	Miller & Co.	Greenock–Martinique	LR; new wales 1809, and good repair 1810
1812	Wools; T.Hamlin (or Hamlyn)	Miller & Co.	London–St Thomas	LR; new wales 1809, and good repair 1810
1814	Hamlin; J.Swan	Miller & Co. J.Croel	Greenock–St Croix	LR; new wales 1809, and good repair 1810

In 1816 there are references in Lloyd's List to the "Hussaren transport".

Year	Master	Owner	Trade	Source & notes
1818	W.Allen; Gray; Phillips	Borrdailes	Cork transport	LR; new wales 1809, good repair 1810, new deck and thorough repair 1814

In April 1817 the transports Kinnersley Castle, Hussaren, and Pomona left Cowes for Portsmouth. There they embarked the 2nd and 63rd Regiments of Foot for Barbados, and the 58th and 61st Regiments of Foot for Jamaica. However, Hussaren, Ailen, master, apparently arrived at Quebec from Cowes on 31 May with 124 officers and men of the 76th and 99th Regiments of Foot. (Note: These officers and men had accepted land grants in Upper Canada from the British government. The 99th Regiment had served in Canada during the War of 1812 and had been withdrawn in 1816 to be disbanded at Chatham. The aim of the land grants was, with the end of the Napoleonic Wars, to reduce the number of demobilized veterans in the United Kingdom.)

Year	Master	Owner	Trade	Source & notes
1819	W.Phillips; G.Gibson	J.Long	London–New Orleans	LR; new wales 1809, good repair 1810, new deck and thorough repair 1814

On 27 December 1818, Hussaren, Gibson, master, had to put back to Ancona after five days at sea on her way to London. Her pumps had become choaked; she had been obliged to discharge her cargo.

Year	Master	Owner	Trade	Source & notes
1821	G[eorge] Gibson	J[ohn] Long	London	LR; iron standards deck, and thorough repair 1820
1822	G.Gibson	J.Long	London	LR; iron standards deck, thorough repair 1820, new deck 1821, & new wales 1822
1823	G.Gibson	J.Long	London–Honduras	LR; iron standards & thorough repair 1820, new deck 1821, & new wales 1822
1825	G.Gibson	J.Long	London–Straits [of Gibraltar]	LR; almost rebuilt 1824
1826	G.Gibson	J.Long	London–CGH	LR; almost rebuilt 1824

Although Hussaren apparently did not sail east of the Cape of Good Hope, she apparently did carry cargoes of goods for the British East India Company (EIC). In 1826 the EIC reported that Hussaren had recently arrived from the Cape with goods belonging to the company.

Hussaren also carried passengers. In early 1827 she brought the Methodist missionary Barnabas Shaw and his family home from the Cape on home leave.

== Fate ==
On 13 January 1828 a hurricane drove Hussaren, Gibson, master, on the Sandwich Sand at Pegwell Bay, Kent after she had lost both her anchors in the Downs. After all attempts to get her off, including cutting her masts to lighten her, had failed, her crew abandoned her. Part of her cargo and all on board were rescued. She had been on a voyage from the Cape of Good Hope to London.
