= Kennersley Castle (1811 ship) =

British merchant ship 1811-1834

History

United Kingdom
- Name: Kennersley Castle
- Namesake: Kinnersley Castle
- Owner: 1811:Temple; 1823:Leasley; 1829:Nicholas Temperley
- Builder: William Smoult Temple, Temple shipbuilders, Jarrow
- Launched: 1811
- Fate: Wrecked 1833; burnt 1834

General characteristics
- Tons burthen: 371, or 400 (bm)
- Sail plan: Snow
- Armament: 8 × 18-pounder carronades

Kennersley Castle (or Kinnersley Castle), was a merchantman launched in 1811. She made several voyages transporting British troops. She also twice transported emigrants from Britain, once to South Africa and then once, most notably because of the subsequent notoriety of her destination, to the at best misguided and at worst fraudulent colony of Poyais. She was wrecked in 1833, and her remains were burned in 1834.

== Career ==
Kennersley Castle appears in Lloyd's Register in 1812, with J. Turner, master, changing to T. Sharp, Temple, owner, and trade London transport.

Around 2 May 1816, Kennersley Castle sailed for Zante, with British troops. At the time Zante was part of the British protectorate of the United States of the Ionian Islands.

On 7 February 1817, Kennersley Castle was sailing from Jamaica to Britain in company with and the transport Retrieve and Pomona when three large Carthaginian privateers chased them off San Domingo. Al three British ships arrived safely at Plymouth in late March.

In April, the transports Kinnersley Castle, Hussaren, and Pomona left Cowes for Portsmouth. There they embarked the 2nd and 63rd Regiments of Foot for Barbados, and the 58th and 61st Regiments of Foot for Jamaica.

Kennersley Castle was one of the three transports that left Gibraltar on 10 May 1818, carrying the 5th Battalion of the 60th Regiment of Foot. She carried 270 officers and men, and 73 women and children. She arrived at Portsmouth on 4 June.

=== South Africa ===
Captain Pinckney sailed Kennersley Castle from Bristol on 10 January 1820. She was bound for South Africa with 202 settlers under sailing under the auspices of the Government Settler Scheme. (Twenty eight vessels left that year with settlers for South Africa.) She reached Table Bay, Cape Town on 29 March, and arrived at Port Elizabeth, Algoa Bay, on 29 April.

Kennersley Castle left Barbados on 2 May 1821, and arrived at Portsmouth in June. She brought part of the 2nd Regiment of Foot.

On 1 July 1821, the transport Kennersley Castle, Day, master, was off Margate. She had lost an anchor on the Goodwin Sands while sailing from Portsmouth to Chatham.

=== Poyais ===
The Register of Shipping for 1823, showed Kennersley Castle with Adams, master, changing to Crouch, Leaseley, owner, and with trade London–Virginia, changing to Leith–Poyais.

The Scottish adventurer Gregor MacGregor attempted to found a colony in Honduras that he called Poyais. MacGregor chartered Kennersley Castle, Crouch, master, in October 1822, to carry emigrants from Scotland to the nascent colony. She was the second emigrant ship and left Leith on 22 January 1823, with about 180 emigrants. She arrived in March and landed her passengers before sailing off. The colony did not exist.

The emigrants were rescued and taken to Belize. Most of the settlers from Kennersley Castle and her predecessor Honduras Packet, died, either at the colony or at Belize. Not much later Skene brought a third group of settlers who did not land at "Poyais" when they found that it had been abandoned; instead they too arrived at Belize.

The investment frenzy and subsequent debacle gave rise to a number of ballads.

The Register of Shipping for 1824 showed Kennersley Castle, with Crouch, master, Leaseley, owner, and trade London–Virginia.

Lloyd's List reported on 4 November 1828, that Kennersley Castle, Crouch, master, had put into Plymouth after being on shore in the Gulf of Saint Lawrence. She underwent a small repair in 1828.

The Register of Shipping for 1830, shows her master as Crouch, changing to Grocock, her owner as Leasley, changing to Temperly, and her trade as Greenock–Quebec.

=== Abandonment ===
When Kinnersley Castle ran aground on a reef near Pictou, Nova Scotia, on 17 September 1830, her crew abandoned her. She was later refloated and taken in to Pictou. At the time of her mishap, Kinnersley Castle was on a voyage from Pugwash, Nova Scotia, to Newcastle upon Tyne, Northumberland.

Actually, she had left Pictou with a cargo of lumber when on 30 September 1830, she struck a rock near the entrance to the harbour and put back waterlogged. She was judged repairable, but that the work could not be completed in time to sail before the winter ice set in. She was put in dock with her cargo on board.

At Pictou, Grewcock, her master, signed over to, or put Kennersley Castle under the care of a Mr. Smith, merchant there, and sailed to England in October. In England, Mr. Temperley, the owner, advised his insurers that she was a total loss. Mr. Loarey, the underwriters agent, gave instructions to Captain Henzell, master of one of Loarey's vessels bound to Nova Scotia, to take charge of Kennersley Castle. Henzell and Smith on 15 June 1831, engaged a shipwright to repair her and made themselves responsible for the costs. The shipwright repaired her. On 7 October, Captain Herring, the substitute master, gave the shipwright a bottomry bond for £2330 13s for the repairs. She then reclaimed her cargo and completed her voyage. She arrived at Liverpool in 1831. Kennersley Castle was sold, as was her cargo, and the proceeds, net of the bond, was £541.

The case was a dispute on the validity of the bond. Temperley himself declared bankruptcy. On 28 February 1833, the High Court of Admiralty upheld the bond and rejected a claim by the underwriters against Mr. Smith for costs.

== Fate ==
Kennersley Castle or Kinnersley Castle was driven ashore and wrecked at Mille Roches, Ontario. Lloyd's List reported on 22 November 1833, that Kennersley Castle was on shore at Mille Vaches, Quebec, full of water.

In May 1834, the Montreal Herald and Daily Commercial Gazette reported that Kennersley Castle, which had stranded near the New Felix, Souligny in Fall 1833, had been burnt to recover her iron. She had been judged not worth refloating.
