= Honduras Packet (1800 ship) =

History

Spain
- Builder: Spain
- Launched: 1798
- Captured: 1800

Great Britain
- Name: Honduras Packet
- Acquired: 1800 by purchase of a prize
- Fate: Last listed 1828 (Lloyd's Register), or 1830 (Register of Shipping)

General characteristics
- Tons burthen: 110, or 142, or 143, or 150, or 160, or 165(bm)
- Propulsion: Sail
- Sail plan: Brig
- Complement: 19
- Armament: 1804:2 × 3-pounder guns + 6 × 4-pounder carronades; 1809:2 × 12-pounder guns ("of the New Construction"); 1810:8 × 6-pounder guns

Honduras Packet was launched in Spain in 1798 under another name and was renamed when the British captured her in 1800. She was a merchantman that between 1804 and 1809 made one, two, or three voyages seal hunting or whaling in the Southern Fishery. She was also the first vessel to transport Scottish emigrants to Honduras in 1822-23 under Gregor MacGregor's ill-conceived and ill-fated "Poyais scheme". She was last listed in 1828–30.

== Career ==
Honduras Packet entered Lloyd's Register (LR) in 1801 with J. Goodwin, master, Collingdon, owner, and trade London–Madeira. She was surveyed on 24 January.

She initially sailed between London and Madeira and London and Spain.

Between 1804 and 1809 Honduras Packet made one, two, or three voyages as a sealer or whaler. The three voyages would have been in 1804–1805 with J. Nichols, master, and C. Hurry and Co., owner, 1805–1806 with Owen Bunker, master, and William Edwards, owner, and 1806–1808 with J. Todrig, master and T. Todrig & Co., owner.

Year	Master	Owner	Trade	Notes & source
1802	J.Goodwin; W. Bulkeley	F, Collingdon; C. Hurry	London–Madeira; Yarmouth	LR
1803	W.Bulkley; J. Nicholson	E.C. Hurry	Yarmouth–Madeira; London–Spain	LR
1804	J. Nichols	E.C. Hurry	London–Spain; London–South Seas	LR
1805	J. Nichols	E.C. Hurry	London–South Seas	LR
1805	O. Bucker	E. Hurry	London–Southern Fishery	Register of Shipping (RS)

Sealing voyage (1804-1806): Captain Owen Bunker sailed Honduras Packet in 1804. In 1804 he anchored at a bay on Stewart Island that became known as Port Honduras, but later Port Adventure after a later sealing ship. She explored Foveaux Strait on her way to the Antipodes Islands. On 22 July 1805 she arrived at Sydney from "Bass's Strait" with 7,000 seal skins. At Sydney the partnership of Lord, Kable, & Underwood hired her. Late in December she returned to the Antipodes where she loaded a cargo of skins, and then sailed for London. She returned to England on 22 May 1806. By one account she was carrying 34,000 skins.

Whaling voyage (1806-1809?): Captain Francis Todrig sailed Honduras Packet from England on 2 September 1806. Honduras Packet, Tedridge, master, was reported to have been well at the island of Boavista on 22 October 1806. Honduras Packet returned to England on 23 May 1809.

It is not clear that this was in fact a whaling voyage. Lloyd's Register for 1808 showed Honduras Packet with trade London–Rio de Janeiro. In October 1808 the packet Honduras rescued the crew of HMS Volador, which had wrecked in the Gulf of Cora. The Register of Shipping for 1809 showed Honduras Packet with F. Todrig, master, F&J Todrig, owners, and trade London–Brazils. The supplemental pages in the issue showed her with Taylor, master, Smith & Co., owners, and trade London–Jamaica.

Lloyd's Register for 1809 again showed Honduras Packet with Todrig, master and owner, and trade London–South Seas. Lloyd's Register continued to carry stale data for some time. The Register of Shipping showed that she became a West Indiaman, sailing to Jamaica, and later a general trader sailing to the Mediterranean.

Year	Master	Owner	Trade	Source
1808	Todrig	Todrig	London–Rio de Janeiro	LR (supplemental pages)
1809	Todrig	Todrig	London–South Seas	LR
1810	Taylor; Clunning	Smith & Co.	London–Jamaica	RS
1815	F. Gibbs; T. Luce	N. Lavers	London–Smyrna	RS
1820	Luxton	N. Lavers	London–Vence	RS; good repair 1816 & damages repaired 1818

At this point the Register of Shipping carried stale data and Lloyd's Register was more up-to-date.

Year	Master	Owner	Trade	Source
1822	Luxton; Hedgecock	Camper & Co.	London–Barbados	LR
1823	Hedgecock	Hedgecock	London–Payais	LR
1824	Hedgecock	Hedgecock	London–Poyais	LR

Poyais: Honduras Packet sailed from London on 10 September 1822 with 70 emigrants bound for Poyais. They arrived at Black River, Honduras, in November, only to discover there was no settlement there and conditions were very different than they had been led to expect. Before they could unload all their stores, a storm came up and Honduras Packet sailed off, not to return. A second emigrant ship, Kennersley Castle, arrived in March 1823, having left Leith with some 200 emigrants in October 1822. With the coming of the rainy season insects infested the camp, diseases such as malaria and yellow fever took hold, and the emigrants sank into utter despair. Eventually, the schooner Mexican Eagle, from British Honduras, discovered the settlers in early May, and took them to Belize in three trips. Eventually, of the roughly 250 who had sailed on Honduras Packet and Kennersley Castle, at least 180 perished.

== Fate ==
Honduras Packet's subsequent history is obscure as Lloyd's Register carried stale data to 1828. The Register of Shipping carried it to 1830.
