= Melchor Feliú =

Spanish governor

42nd Royal Governor of La Florida
- In office March 20, 1762 – July 27, 1763
- Preceded by: Alonso de Cárdenas
- Succeeded by: James Grant (East Florida) and George Johnstone (West Florida)

Personal details
- Born: unknown
- Died: August 18, 1766 Havana
- Profession: Administrator (Governor of Florida)

Melchor Feliú (?-1766) was the last governor in the First Spanish Period of Florida's history, governing from March 20, 1762 to July 27, 1763. Feliú oversaw the cession of Florida to Great Britain by the Treaty of Paris on July 21, 1763 and the subsequent immigration of most of the province's Spanish and African inhabitants to Cuba. Some of the Native Americans living in the Spanish Catholic missions also moved away from Florida at this time.

== Government of Florida ==
Melchor Feliú was appointed governor of Florida on March 20, 1762.

=== Relations with Native Americans and strengthening defense of the colony ===
During his administration, Feliú, like his predecessors, continued to support the Franciscan missions established at various Native American villages, and tried to revive friendly relations with former indigenous allies that former Florida governor Lucas Fernando Palacios had broken, even granting Christian Native Americans the same rights as the colonists.

Following the war between Spain and England, which had revealed the vulnerability of Florida to an English attack, Feliú sought to improve the military readiness of the province. To supplement the ranks of the some 2,000 soldiers that the Florida militia could muster, Feliú invited enslaved peoples in the British and French colonies of North America to escape to Florida and become Spanish citizens in exchange for joining Florida's militia, a stratagem that proved successful.

Feliú had the thick forest between Fort Mose and St. Augustine cut down to deprive the Native Americans of cover to launch their raids, saving five thousand suitable logs to use as stakes in constructing fortifications. He doubtless recruited lumberjacks from the Mose militiamen for this project, and assigned them to help raise the earthen defensive line from Fort Mose to the San Sebastian River. These black soldiers from Fort Mose helped build a stockaded fort where the line joined the San Sebastian, working alongside the moreno and pardo troops sent from Havana to help defend the city.

=== Engineers in St. Augustine ===
When Feliú came to St. Augustine in 1762, he brought with him a military engineer by the name of Pablo Castelló. Castelló and mission engineer Juan de Cotilla, who had returned to Florida in 1763, became important Spanish architects in the region. Cotilla was even instructed to assist Feliú in organizing the departure of Spanish colonists from Florida. Spanish inhabitants of St. Augustine, as well as Feliú himself, trusted Cotilla to assist in the sale of their properties.

=== Cession of Florida to Britain ===
On July 21, 1763, Feliú signed the documents that ceded Florida to Great Britain by the 1763 Treaty of Paris. The official ceremony took place at the Castillo de San Marcos, where he delivered the city keys to Major John Hedges, the ranking representative of King George III.

Feliú oversaw the evacuation of the Spanish troops and almost the entire population of Spanish citizens of Florida to Havana, Cuba, which had been captured by Great Britain in 1762 during the Seven Years' War, and was regained by Spain according to the terms of the treaty (until the exchange, Florida belonged to the Captaincy General of Cuba). Feliú organized a flotilla of ships to transport the Floridanos (Spanish Floridians) including Blacks from Gracia Real de Santa Teresa de Mose, as well as Native Americans from the missions of Nuestra Senora de Guadalupe de Tolomato and Nuestra Senora de la Leche, to Cuba.

The exodus of people leaving Florida began on April 12, 1763. The mass immigration of the Floridanos to Cuba ended on February 5, 1764. Feliú decided to leave seven soldiers and an interpreter in Florida. (Note: Only eight Spaniards stayed behind in St. Augustine during the British occupation, among them Luciano Herrera (1736-1789), who proceeded to spy on the British administration for Spain. This espionage was subsequently discovered by the British governor, Patrick Tonyn, when letters sent by Herrera to Spanish military officers in Cuba were intercepted, forcing Herrera to flee to Havana with his wife. He returned to Saint Augustine with his family in the early 1780s after Spain regained Florida in 1783, becoming chief supervisor of East Florida under governor Vicente Manuel de Cespedes. There he died.)

Feliú was determined to ascertain the validity of all land titles before properties were sold to British subjects. The deeds, signed by the governor and the royal treasurer, Juan Esteban de Peña, affirmed that the Spanish owners of the lands had legitimate titles and that, according to the Treaty of Paris, John Gordon and Jesse Fish had become the "true and lawful owners and possessors" of those lands.
