= Lucas Fernando Palacios =

40th Royal Governor of La Florida
- In office 21 April 1758 – 6 December 1761
- Preceded by: Alonso Fernández de Heredia
- Succeeded by: Alonso de Cárdenas

Personal details
- Born: Unknown
- Died: Late 1761 Florida
- Profession: Military official and administrator (governor of Florida)

Lucas Fernando Palacios y Valenzuela (?? - 1761) was a military official who served as governor of Spanish Florida from 21 April 1758 to 6 December 1761.

== Biography ==
Palacios joined the Spanish Royal Army in his youth as a cadet, attaining the ranks of Captain and Field Marshal. He served in the Spanish Guards Regiment as well, where he also ascended the ranks, eventually being named Knight of the Order of Alcantara and Commander of the Order of Calatrava.

On April 21, 1758, Palacios was appointed Royal Governor of the Spanish province of La Florida. Under his administration, the province saw renewed growth of the Spanish population with the arrival of Spanish settlers sent by the Spanish crown from the Canary Islands (a colonization effort that began in 1757 and would extend for 47 years).

In 1759, still under the Palacios administration, the Spanish began to build a stone fort designed to resist bombardment by ships at San Marcos de Apalache (St. Marks, Florida) in East Florida; the boundary between the two Floridas, East and West, was the Apalachicola River. They abandoned it to Native Americans for use as a trading post after ceding the territory to the British following the defeat of France in the Seven Years' War, also known as the French and Indian War (1754–1763). The British then installed a garrison at the fort, but following the American Revolutionary War, the British traded some territory with Spain, which resumed control of West and East Florida. Spanish forces reoccupied the fort in 1783 and strengthened its defenses.

In late 1761, while still governor of the province, Palacios was killed in battle fighting against Amerindian forces in the area.
