= Governor White =

Governor White may refer to:

- Albert B. White (1856–1941), 11th Governor of West Virginia
- Benjamin F. White (Montana politician) (1833–1920), 9th Governor of Montana Territory
- Edward Douglass White Sr. (1795–1847), 10th Governor of Louisiana
- Enrique White (1741–1811), 3rd Governor of West Florida from 1793 to 1795 and 4th Governor of East Florida from 1796 to 1811
- Frank White (North Dakota politician) (1856–1940), 8th Governor of North Dakota
- Frank D. White (1933–2003), 41st Governor of Arkansas
- George White (British Army officer) (1835–1912), Governor of Gibraltar from 1900 to 1905
- George White (Ohio politician) (1872–1953), 52nd Governor of Ohio
- Horace White (1865–1943), 37th Governor of New York
- Hugh L. White (1881–1965), 45th and 50th Governor of Mississippi
- Hugo White (1939–2014), Governor of Gibraltar from 1995 to 1997
- John White (colonist and artist) (1540s–1590s), Governor of failed Roanoke Colony
- Mark White (Texas politician) (1940–2017), 43rd Governor of Texas

== See also ==
- William Pinkney Whyte (1824–1908), 35th Governor of Maryland
