= Governor Howard =

Governor Howard may refer to:

- Benjamin Howard (Missouri politician) (1760–1814), 1st Governor of Missouri Territory
- Carlos Howard (1738–?), Governor of West Florida from 1792 to 1793
- Francis Howard, 5th Baron Howard of Effingham (1643–1690s), Crown Governor of Virginia from 1683 to 1692
- George Howard (Governor of Maryland) (1789–1846), 22nd Governor of Maryland
- Henry Howard (colonial governor) (1913–1977), Governor of the British Virgin Islands from 1954 to 1956
- Henry Howard (Rhode Island politician) (1826–1905), 32nd Governor of Rhode Island
- John Eager Howard (1752–1827), 5th Governor of Maryland
- William Alanson Howard (1813–1880), 6th Governor of the Dakota Territory
