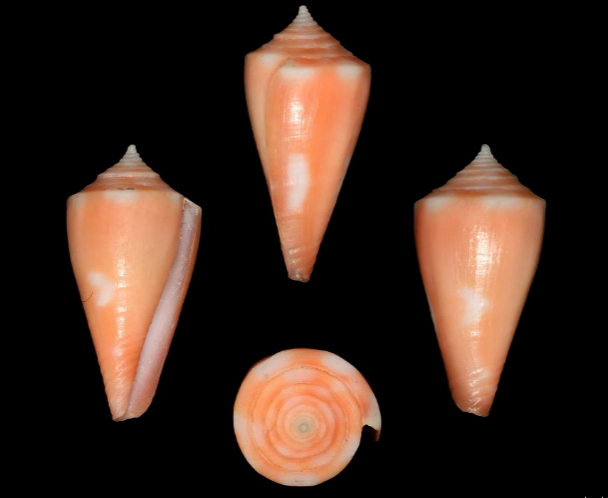
- Shell and protoconch of Conus flamingo (holotype at the Smithsonian Institution)

Scientific classification
- Kingdom: Animalia
- Phylum: Mollusca
- Class: Gastropoda
- Subclass: Caenogastropoda
- Order: Neogastropoda
- Superfamily: Conoidea
- Family: Conidae
- Genus: Conus
- Species: C. flamingo

Binomial name
- Conus flamingo Petuch, 1980

Synonyms
- Conus (Dauciconus) flamingo Petuch, 1980 · accepted, alternate representation; Gradiconus flamingo (Petuch, 1980); Tuckericonus flamingo (Petuch, 1980)

= Conus flamingo =

Species of sea snail

Conus flamingo is a species of sea snail, a marine gastropod mollusk in the family Conidae, the cone snails, cone shells or cones.

These snails are predatory and venomous. They are capable of stinging humans.

== Description ==
The size of the shell varies between 16 and 27 mm (0.63 and 1.06 in).

== Distribution ==
Locus typicus: Off Dania, Broward County, Florida, USA.

This marine species of cone snail occurs off Eastern Florida at a depth of 46 m (151 ft).
