= Capture of Minorca (1798) =

British victory over Spain

- Part of the Mediterranean campaign of 1798
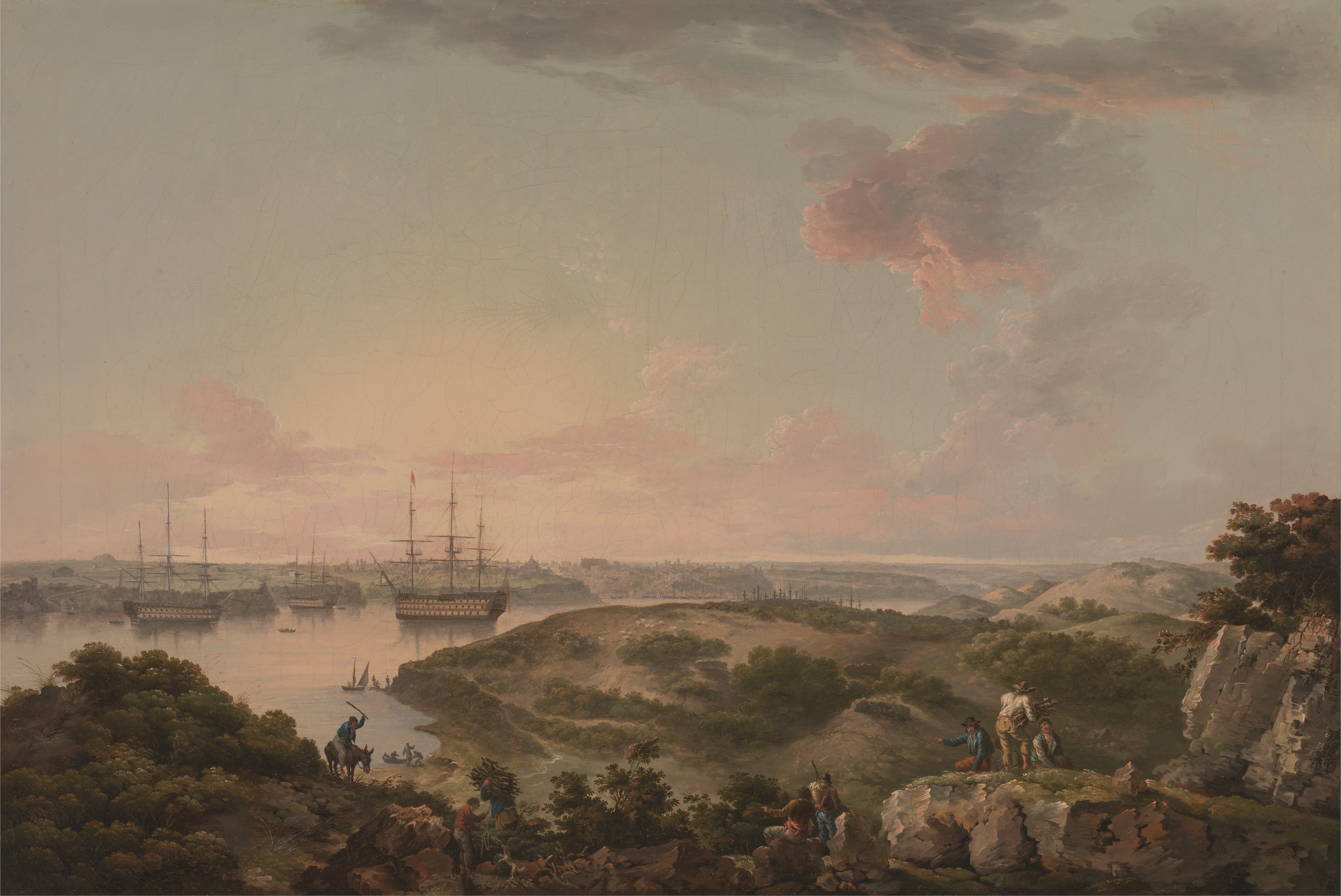
- c. 1795 painting of Port Mahon with British warships at anchor three years before the invasion
Date	7–15 November 1798
Location	Menorca, Spain 39.9500°N 4.0500°E
Result	British victory
Territorial changes	British occupation of Menorca

Belligerents
Great Britain	Spain

Commanders and leaders
John Duckworth; Charles Stuart	Juan Nepomuceno de Quesada (surrendered)

Strength
6,000 troops; 20 warships	4,284+ troops; 8 frigates

Casualties and losses
Unknown killed or wounded	Unknown killed or wounded; 4,284 captured; 4 frigates captured

The capture of Minorca occurred in November 1798 during the Mediterranean campaign of 1798 of the War of the Second Coalition. The Spanish-held island of Menorca, historically called Minorca by English-speakers, was invaded and occupied by a British expeditionary force of 6,000 troops and 20 warships under Captain John Duckworth and Colonel Charles Stuart. British forces landed on 7 November and following several skirmishes forced the outnumbered Spanish garrison under the governor of Menorca Juan Nepomuceno de Quesada to fully surrender by 15 November. The British occupied the island for almost four years, using it as a major naval base, before permanently returning it to Spain in 1802 as a result of the Treaty of Amiens.

== Background ==
The island had traditionally belonged to Spain, but was captured in 1708 by the British and was subsequently ceded to Britain by Spain under Article XI of the Treaty of Utrecht (1713). The British retained their possession until 1783 when it was returned to Spain at the Treaty of Paris. During their occupation the British had used it as a naval base, but it was extremely vulnerable to capture by Spanish or French forces as shown by two separate sieges in 1756 and 1781.

While Britain and Spain had initially entered the French Revolutionary War as allies, in 1796 Spain had switched to supporting France and had gone to war with Britain. The British attempted to assert their authority over the Mediterranean but had a shortage of usable bases. After the failure to establish a British presence in Corsica, other targets such as Menorca, Malta, and Elba were considered. Once the French Mediterranean Fleet had been destroyed in Aboukir Bay, Earl St Vincent was determined to restore British hegemony in the Mediterranean. To ensure this, his fleet needed a base with a well protected deep water harbour that could not be assaulted by land. The best island harbour in the Western Mediterranean was at Port Mahon on Menorca, where a large modern dockyard included a careening wharf, extensive storehouses and a purpose-built naval hospital. At the end of October St Vincent decided to send an expedition against Menorca, which departed on 19 October 1798.

== Invasion ==
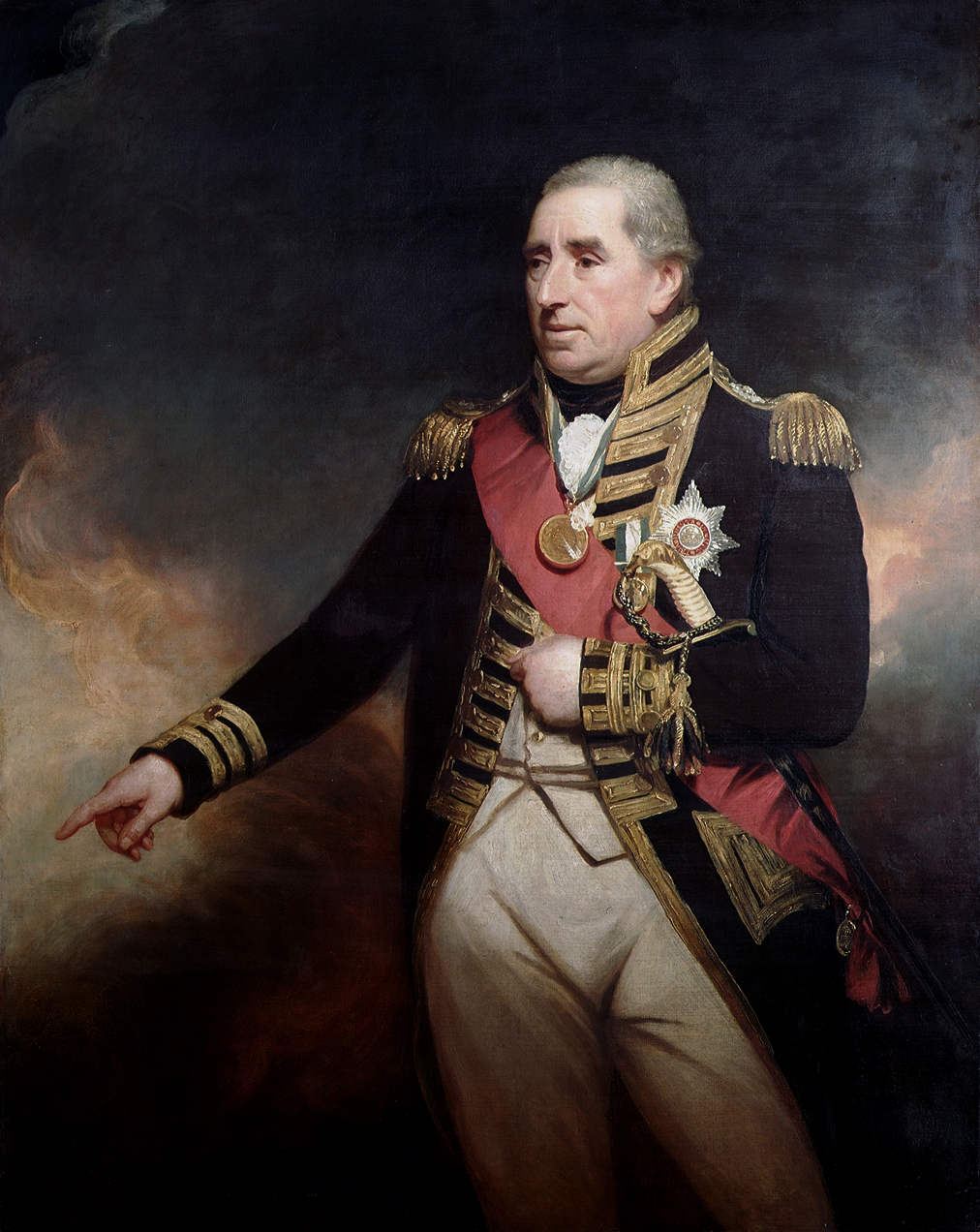
Captain John Duckworth, who commanded the naval contingent of the invasion force

The expeditionary force arrived off Menorca on 7 November and St Vincent detached three ships of the line, HMS Leviathan (1790), HMS Orion (1787), and HMS Princess Royal (1773) three frigates and several smaller vessels and transports to the island under Captain John Duckworth, carrying 6,000 troops under Colonel Charles Stuart. A force was put ashore at the Addya Creek and destroyed a Spanish artillery position and from there an attack by the garrison was driven off. Over the next two days the British army continued inland, with a force of 300 men under Colonel Henry Paget capturing Fort Charles which allowed the British fleet to enter the harbour and anchor there while the main army received the surrender of town after town, including Fournella, which overlooked the island's principal protected anchorage and then Mercadal.

On 11 November a Spanish squadron of four frigates attempted to disrupt operations, but a swift counterattack by Duckworth's ships drove them off. Stuart had moved his army to harass Ciudadella by the 14th. After offering only token resistance the Spanish governor, Juan Nepomuceno de Quesada surrendered Ciudadela on 16 November and control of the island was ceded to British forces. 3,528 Spanish other ranks and 156 officers were captured by the British, as well as a large amount of supplies and weaponry and 600 Swiss soldiers who had been taken prisoner by Austrian forces and sold to Spain for two dollars per person. In addition, four Spanish frigates, Flora and Proserpina (40 guns) and Casilda and Pomona (38 guns), were captured along with their crews.

== Aftermath ==
The British converted the island into one of their principal Mediterranean bases. Many expeditions were launched from the island, and Thomas Cochrane, in particular, used the island as a base for his operations along the Spanish Coast. Charles Stuart served as the Governor of Menorca between 1798 and 1800, with Henry Edward Fox taking over the post thereafter.

The Treaty of Amiens agreed in 1802, called for the return of Menorca to Spain as a condition as what was hoped for a lasting peace in Europe. The return of Menorca and other Mediterranean bases was bitterly opposed by many officers, including Horatio Nelson who appeared in the House of Lords to speak against the prospect. In spite of this opposition, the Treaty was concluded, and the British commander Richard Bickerton oversaw the British evacuation.

The peace rapidly broke down, but no effort was made to recover Menorca as major bases had been established in other ports (Malta).

== Bibliography ==
- Harvey, Robert.Cochrane: The Life and Exploits of a Fighting Captain. Constable & Robinson, 2000.
- Knight, Roger.The Pursuit of Victory: The Life and Achievements of Horatio Nelson. Penguin Books, 2006.
