= Amelia Island =

Island in the U.S. state of Florida

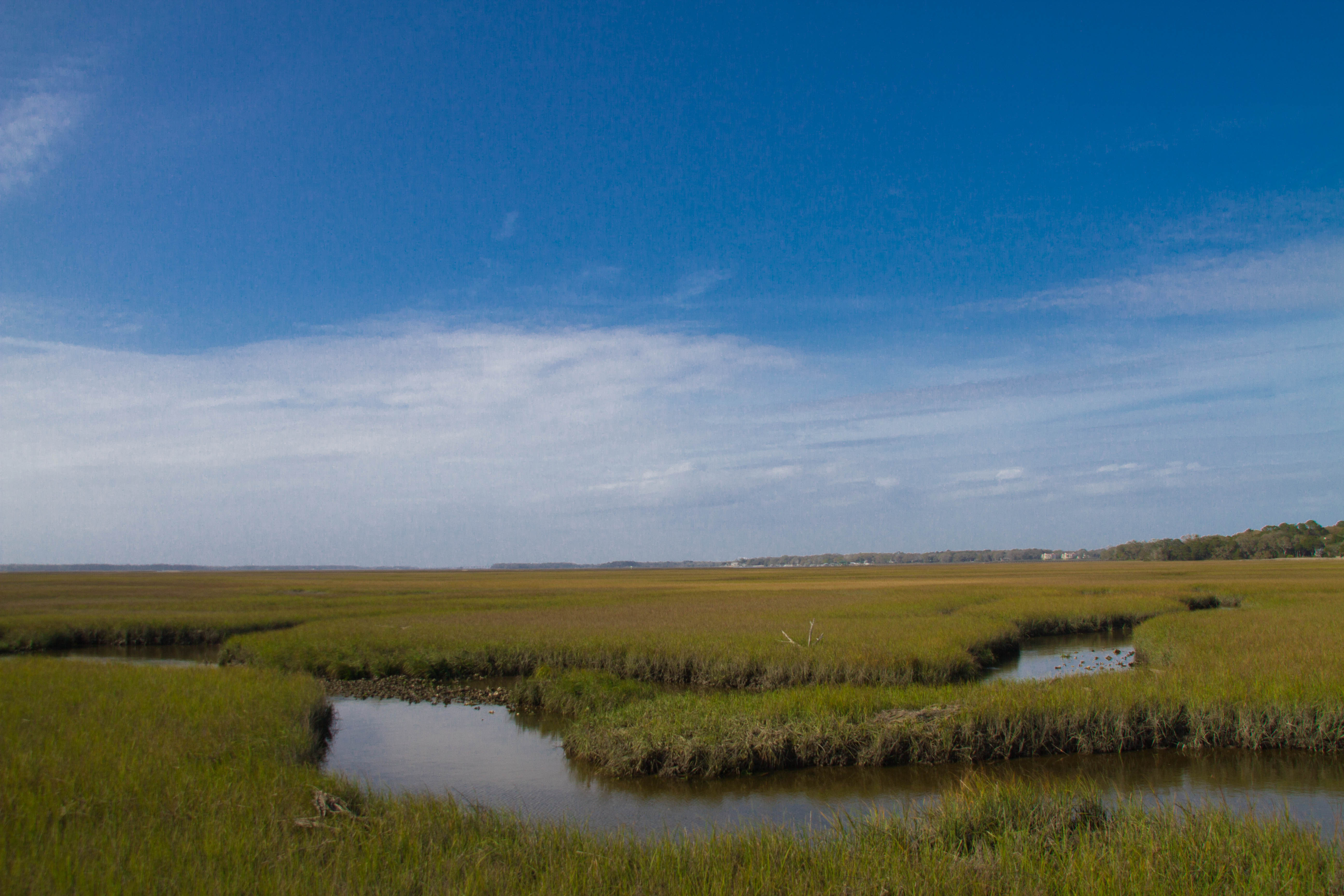
- Marshes surrounding Amelia Island

- Amelia Island Amelia Island (North Atlantic)
- Interactive map of Amelia Island

Geography
- Location: North Atlantic
- Coordinates: 30°36′56″N 81°27′14″W
- Length: 21 km (13 mi)
- Width: 6.5 km (4.04 mi)

Administration
- United States

Additional information
- Time zone: EST (UTC-5:00)
  - Summer (DST): EDT (UTC-4:00)

Amelia Island is a part of the Sea Islands chain that stretches along the East Coast of the United States from South Carolina to Florida; it is the southernmost of the Sea Islands, and the northernmost of the barrier islands on Florida's Atlantic coast. Lying in Nassau County, Florida, it is 13 miles (21 km) long and approximately 4 miles (6.4 km) wide at its widest point. The communities of Fernandina Beach, Amelia City, and American Beach are located on the island, and it is in the Jacksonville metropolitan area.

== Geography ==
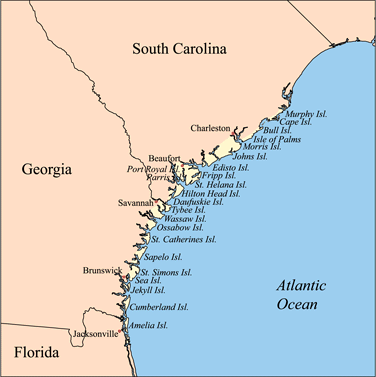
The Sea Islands, of which Amelia is the southernmost island.

The Amelia Island Trail is a part of the East Coast Greenway, a 3,000 mile-long system of trails connecting Maine to Florida.

=== Airport ===
Fernandina Beach Municipal Airport (KFHB), a general aviation airport and former military airbase also used at times by the U.S. Navy, the U.S. Coast Guard and the Florida Air National Guard, is located on the island.

== History ==
The island was named for Princess Amelia, daughter of George II of Great Britain, and rule over the island changed hands between colonial powers a number of times. Eight flags have flown over Amelia Island: the French, Spanish, British, Floridian/Patriot, Green Cross, Mexican, and Confederate flags, and that of the United States.

=== Early European settlement ===
American Indian bands associated with the Timucua people settled on the island around 1000, which they called Napoyca. They remained there until the early 18th century. In 1562, French Huguenot explorer Jean Ribault became the first recorded European visitor to Napoyca, and he named the island Île de Mai. In 1565, Spanish forces led by Pedro Menéndez de Avilés drove the French from northeastern Florida by attacking their stronghold at Fort Caroline on the Rivière de Mai (later called Río de San Juan by the Spanish, and later the St. Johns River in English). They killed Ribault and perhaps 350 other French colonists who had been shipwrecked further down the coast.

=== Spanish rule ===
In 1573 Spanish Franciscans established the Santa María de Sena mission on the island, which they named Isla de Santa María. In the early 17th century, the Spanish relocated the Mocama people from their former settlements to Santa María de Sena.

In 1680, British raids on St. Catherines Island, Georgia resulted in the Christian Guale Indians abandoning the Santa Catalina de Guale mission and relocating to Spanish missions on Isla de Santa María. In 1702, the Spanish abandoned these missions after South Carolina's colonial governor James Moore led an invasion of Florida with British colonists and their Native American allies.

Georgia's founder and colonial governor James Oglethorpe renamed this island as "Amelia Island" in honor of Princess Amelia (1710–1786), daughter of George II of Great Britain, although it was still a Spanish possession. Oglethorpe successfully negotiated with Spanish colonial officials for the island to be transferred to British sovereignty after ordering the garrison of Scottish Highlanders to build a fort on the northwestern edge of the island. Philip V, the King of Spain, rescinded the agreement.

=== British rule ===
Oglethorpe withdrew his troops in 1742. The area became a buffer zone between the English and Spanish colonies until the Treaty of Paris (1763) settling the Seven Years' War, in which Britain defeated France. Under the treaty, Spain traded Florida to Great Britain in order to regain control of Havana, Cuba; the treaty nullified all Spanish land grants in Florida. The Proclamation of 1763 established the St. Marys River as East Florida's northeastern boundary.

During the early period of British rule, the island was known as Egmont Isle, after Lord Egmont who had a 10,000-acre plantation covering almost the entire island. Its headquarters were presumably the so-called "New Settlement" on the south side of the mouth of Egan's Creek adjoining the Amelia River, the site of the present-day Old Town. Egmont had only recently begun his development of the island in 1770, when Gerard de Brahm prepared his map, the "Plan of Amelia, Now Egmont Island". This depicted most of the planned development at the north end.

Egmont died in December 1770, whereupon his widow Lady Egmont assumed control of his vast Florida estates. She continued to develop the plantation and appointed Stephen Egan as her agent to manage it. With the forced labor of enslaved African Americans, he produced profitable indigo crops there. until it was destroyed by American troops from Georgia in 1776.

=== Spanish rule returns ===
In the late 1770s and early 1780s, during the American Revolutionary War, British loyalists fleeing Charleston and Savannah hastily erected new buildings at the settlement, calling their impromptu town Hillsborough. Spain regained possession of Florida in 1783, under the terms of the new United States settlement with Great Britain. Amelia harbor was an embarkation point for Loyalists leaving the colony; they tore down buildings and took the lumber with them. In June 1785, former British governor Patrick Tonyn moved his command to Hillsborough town, from which he sailed to England and evacuated troops and Loyalists later that year.

After the British evacuation, Mary Mattair, her children, and a slave worker were the sole occupants left on Amelia island. She had received a grant from Governor Tonyn of the property on the bluff overlooking the Amelia River. Following the exchange of flags in 1784, the Spanish Crown allowed Mattair to remain on the island. In trade for the earlier British grant, the Spanish authorities awarded her 150 acres (61 ha) within the present-day city limits of Fernandina Beach. The site of Mattair's initial grant is today's Old Town Fernandina.

In 1783, the Second Treaty of Paris ended the Revolutionary War and returned Florida to Spain. The British inhabitants of Florida had 18 months to sell their belongings, collect any debts owed them, and remove their personal effects and themselves from the province. In June 1795, American rebel marauders led by Richard Lang attacked the Spanish garrison on Amelia Island. Colonel Charles Howard, an officer in the Spanish military, discovered that the rebels had built a battery and were flying the French flag. On August 2, he raised a sizable Spanish force, sailed up Sisters Creek and the Nassau River, and attacked them. The rebels fled across the St. Marys to Georgia.

During those years, Pedro Díaz Berrio, an engineer in the Spanish Army, drew the plans for a series of forts on the island:

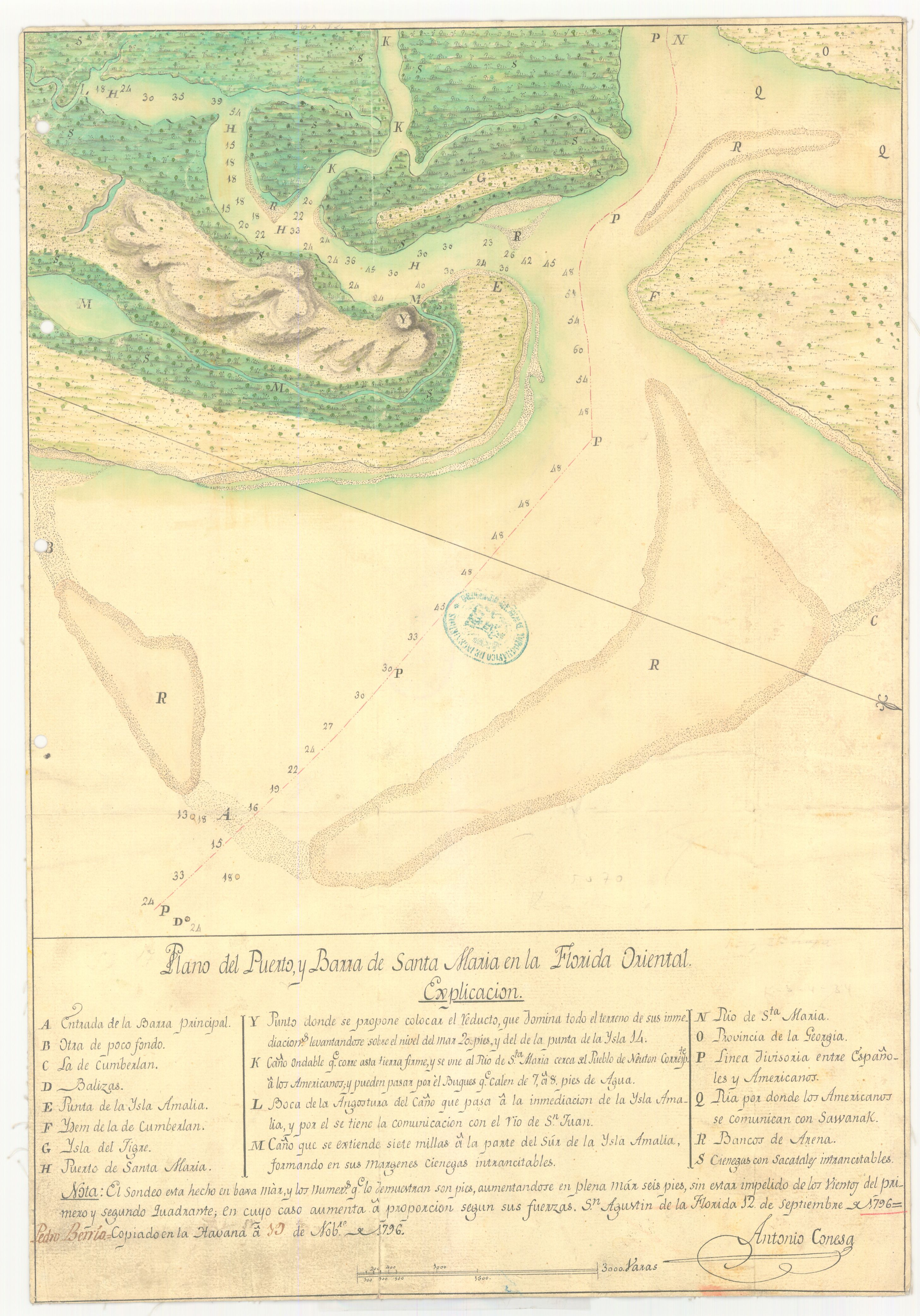
Map of the Santa María River Harbor and Bar in East Florida, original by Antonio Conesa; copied in Havana on November 19, 1796, by Pedro Berrio

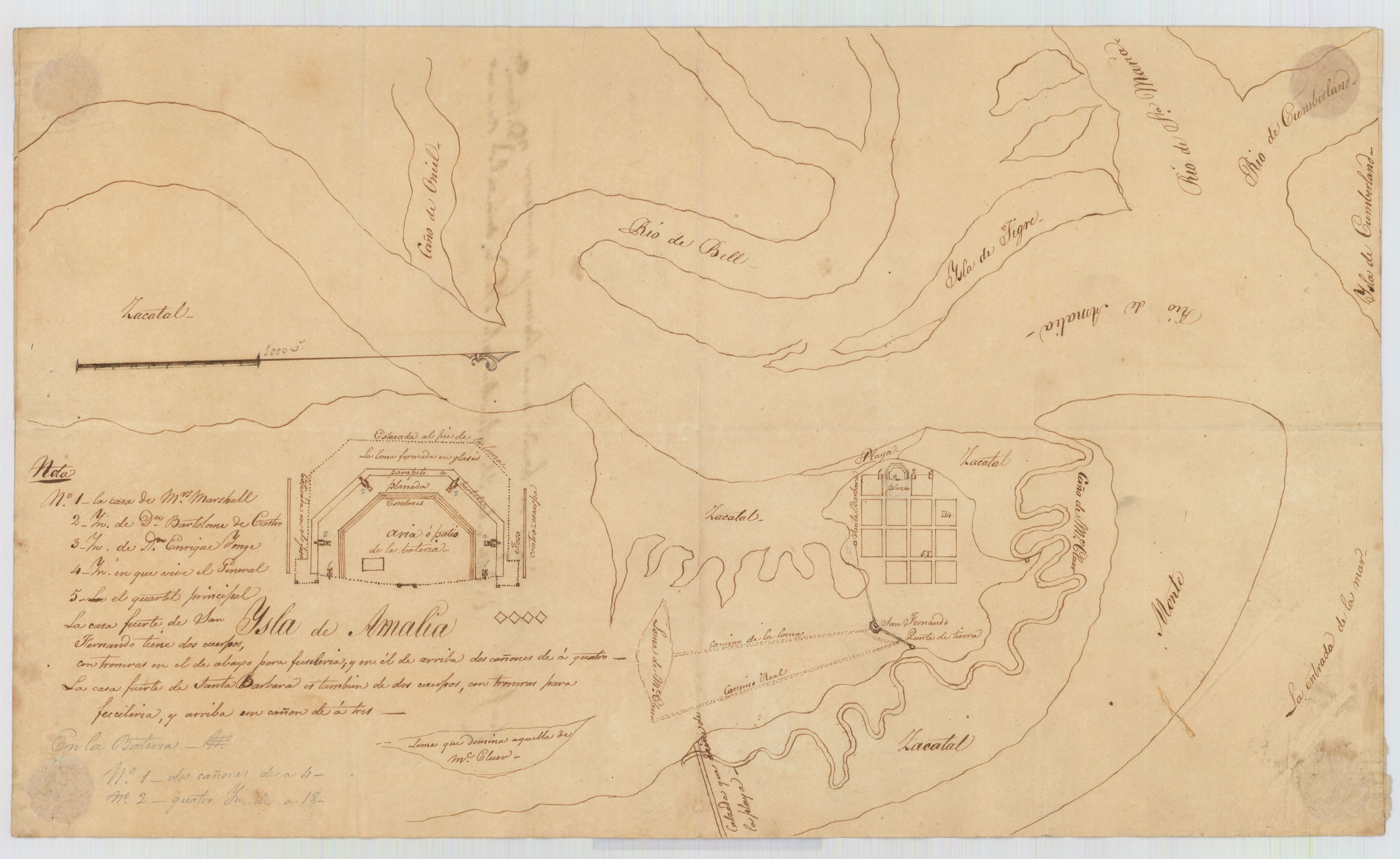
Sketch of Amelia Island, Francisco Cortazar

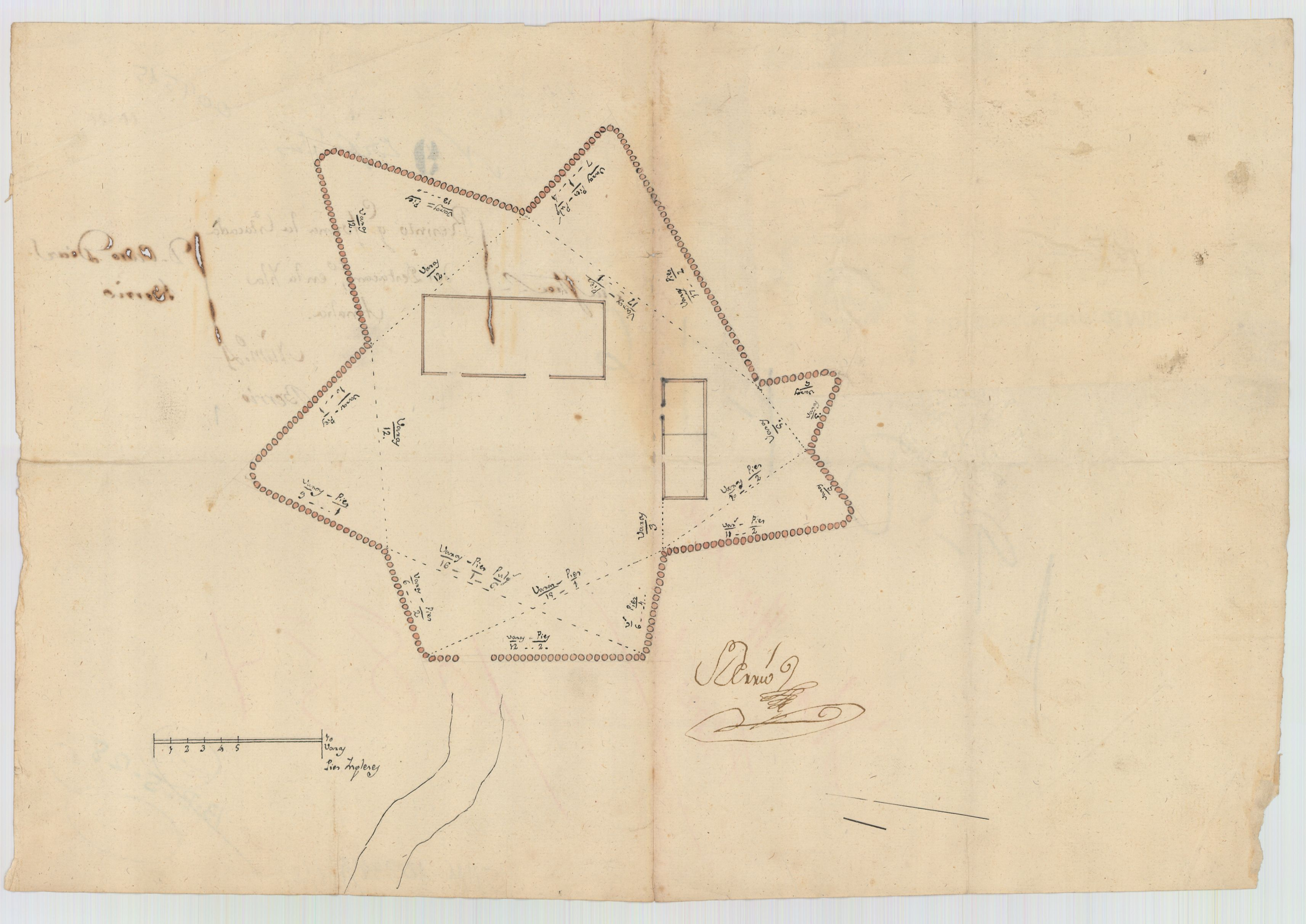
Wooden stake fort, Pedro Díaz Berrio

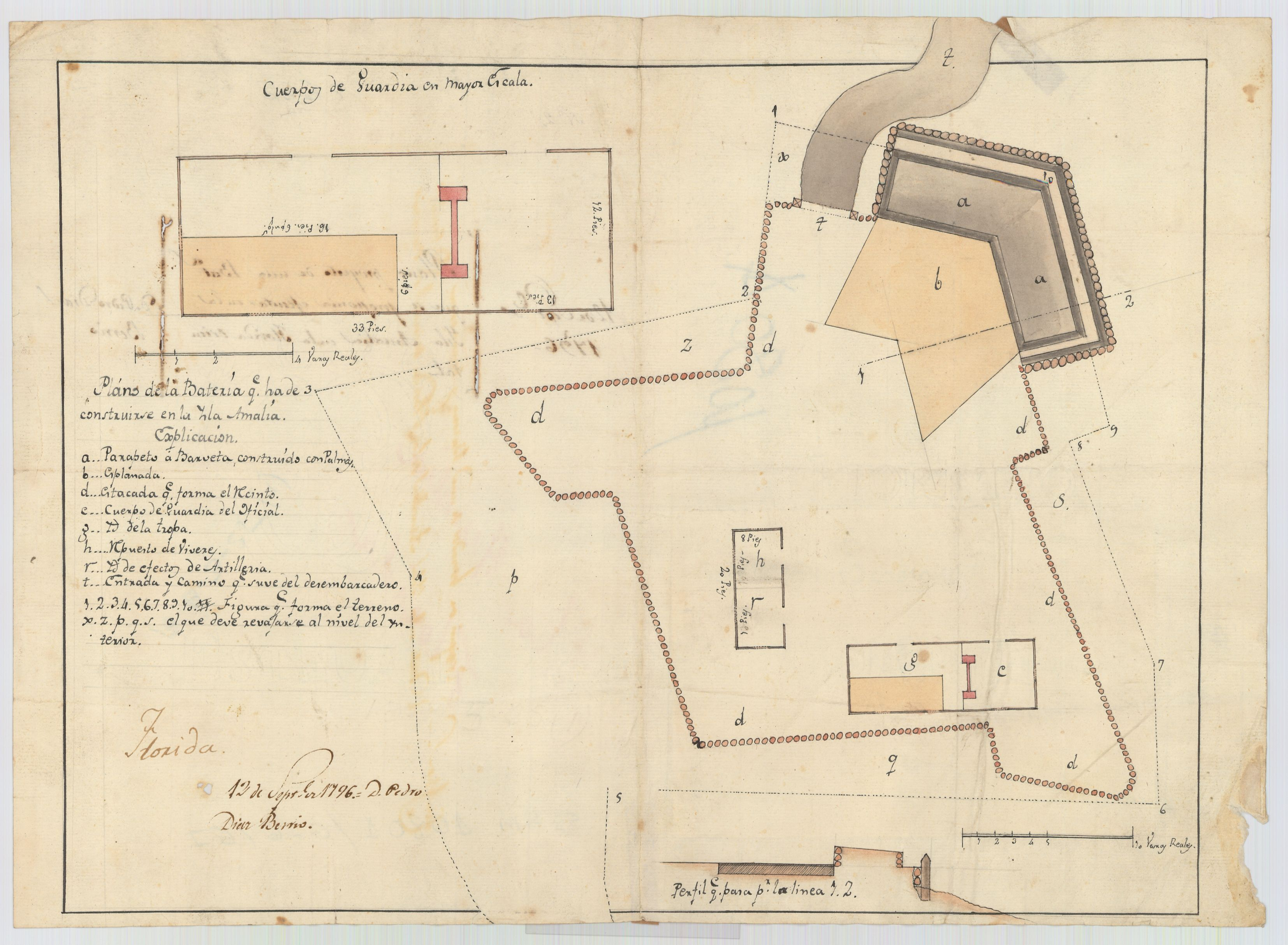
Gun battery, Pedro Diaz Berrio

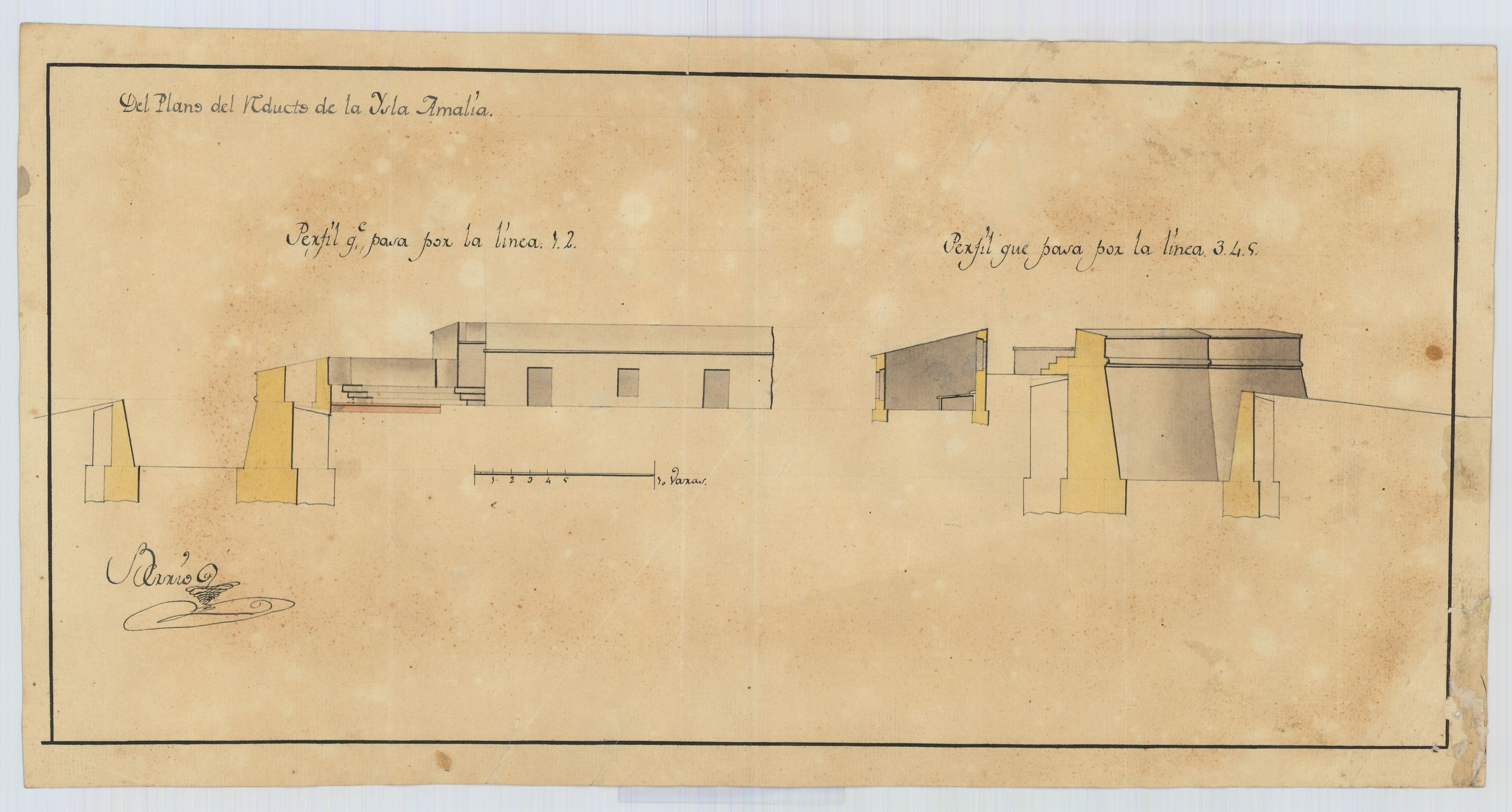
Fort, Pedro Diaz Berrio

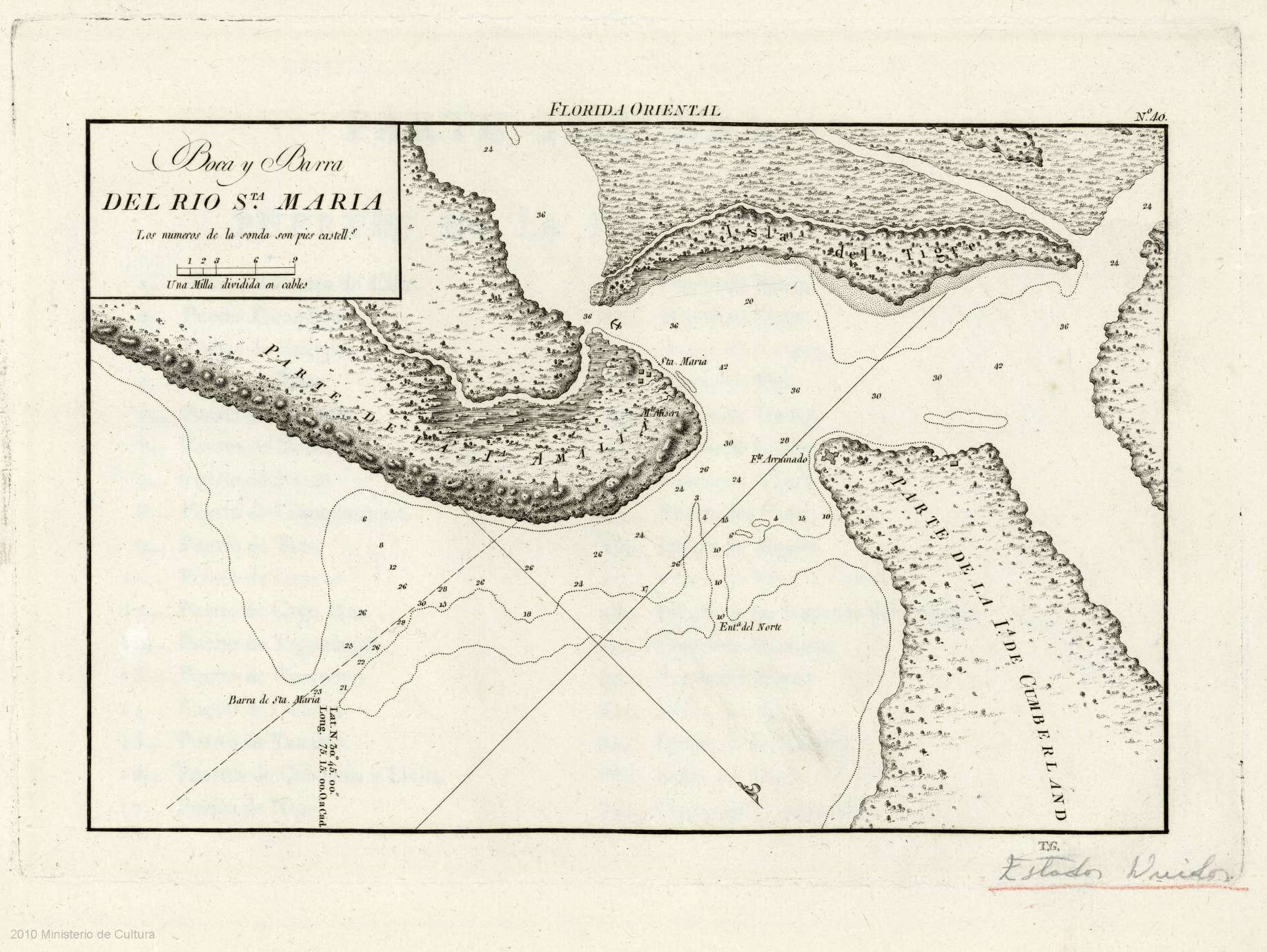
Mouth and bar of the Santa María River, 1809

In 1811, surveyor George J. F. Clarke platted the town of Fernandina, named in honor of King Ferdinand VII of Spain by Enrique White, the governor of the Spanish province of East Florida.

The East Florida Patriot flag

=== U.S.-led "Patriot War" ===
On March 16, 1812, Amelia Island was invaded and seized by insurgents from the United States calling themselves the "Patriots of Amelia Island," under the command of General George Mathews, a former governor of Georgia. This action was tacitly approved by President James Madison. General Mathews moved into a house at St. Marys, Georgia, just nine miles across Cumberland Sound from Fernandina on the northwest end of the island.

That same day, nine American gunboats under the command of Commodore Hugh Campbell formed a line in the harbor and aimed their guns at the town. From Point Peter, General Mathews ordered Colonel Lodowick Ashley to send a flag to Don Justo Lopez, commandant of the fort and Amelia Island, and demand his surrender. Lopez acknowledged the superior force and surrendered the port and the town. John H. McIntosh, George J. F. Clarke, Justo Lopez, and others signed the articles of capitulation; the Patriots raised their own standard. It was described as "...a white field, on which is represented a Soldier in the act of charging bayonet-with the Motto-SALUS POPULI-LEX SUPREMA." The next day, March 17 they flew another flag bearing the motto "Vox no qul lex Sallius." On the same day a detachment of 250 regular United States troops were brought from Point Peter, and the newly constituted Patriot government surrendered the town to General Matthews. He took formal possession in the name of the United States, ordering the Patriot flag struck and the flag of the United States to be raised immediately.

This was part of a plan by General Mathews and President Madison to annex East Florida, but Congress became alarmed at the possibility of being drawn into war with Spain while engaged in the War of 1812 against Great Britain. The effort fell apart when Secretary of State James Monroe was forced to relieve Matthews of his commission. Negotiations began for the withdrawal of U.S. troops early in 1813. On May 6, the army lowered the flag at Fernandina and took its remaining troops across the St. Marys River to Georgia. Spain seized the redoubt and regained control of the island. In 1816 the Spanish completed construction of the new Fort San Carlos to guard Fernandina.

=== Gregor MacGregor and the Republic of the Floridas ===
The Green Cross flag

Insurgencies and filibuster efforts continued. Gregor MacGregor, a Scottish-born soldier of fortune, led an army of 150 men, including recruits from Charleston and Savannah, some War of 1812 veterans, and 55 musketeers, in an assault of Fort San Carlos on June 29, 1817. The commander, Francisco Morales, struck the Spanish flag and fled. MacGregor raised his flag, the "Green Cross of Florida", a green cross on a white ground, over the fort and proclaimed the "Republic of the Floridas". On September 4, faced with the threat of Spanish reprisal, and lacking money and adequate reinforcements, MacGregor abandoned his plans to conquer Florida and departed Fernandina for the Bahamas with most of his officers, leaving a small detachment of men at Fort San Carlos. The garrison and a force of American irregulars, organized by Ruggles Hubbard and former Pennsylvania congressman Jared Irwin, repelled the Spanish attempt to reassert authority.

=== Battle of Amelia Island ===
On September 13 the Battle of Amelia Island started when the Spaniards erected a battery of four brass cannons on McLure's Hill east of the fort. With about 300 men, supported by two gunboats, they shelled Fernandina. Irwin's forces included ninety-four men, the privateer ships Morgiana and St. Joseph, and the armed schooner Jupiter. Spanish gunboats began firing at 3:30 pm and the battery on the hill joined the cannonade. The guns of Fort San Carlos, on the river bluff northwest of the hill, and those of the St. Joseph defended Amelia Island. Cannonballs killed two and wounded other Spanish troops clustered below. Firing continued until dark. The Spanish commander, convinced he could not capture the island, withdrew his forces.

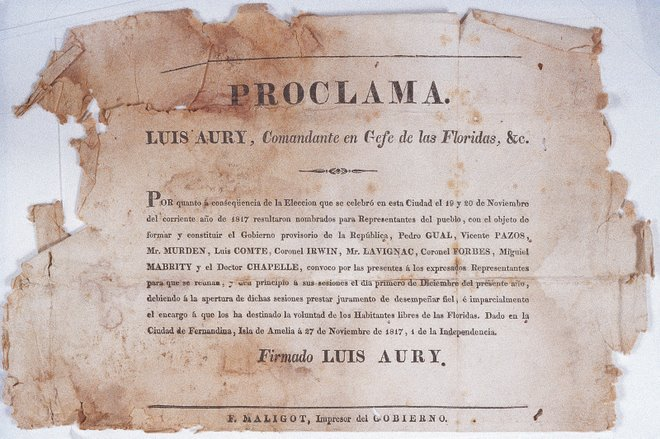
An official document announcing the results of elections held under Louis-Michel Aury's authority in 1817.

=== French privateer Louis-Michel Aury ===
Hubbard and Irwin later joined forces with French-born pirate Louis-Michel Aury, who laid claim to Amelia Island supposedly on behalf of the revolutionary Republic of Mexico. He had formerly been associated with MacGregor in South American filibuster adventures, Aury had also been a leader among a group of buccaneers based on Galveston Island, Texas.

Aury assumed control of Amelia, creating an administrative body called the "Supreme Council of the Floridas". Two Spanish American operatives, Pedro Gual Escandón and Vicente Pazos, arrived to help establish the government and to draft a constitution; they invited all of Florida to unite in throwing off the Spanish yoke. For the few months that Aury controlled Amelia Island, the flag of the revolutionary Republic of Mexico was flown. His supposed "clients" were still fighting the Spanish in their war for independence at the time.

=== U.S. occupation ===
The United States planned to annex Florida and sent a naval force, which captured Amelia Island on December 23, 1817. Aury surrendered the island to Commodore J.D. Henley and Major James Bankhead's U.S. forces on December 23, 1817. He stayed on the island more than two months as an unwelcome guest; Bankhead occupied Fernandina and President James Monroe vowed to hold it "in trust for Spain". This episode in Florida's history became known as the Amelia Island Affair.

=== Spanish cession of the Floridas to the United States ===
Although angered by U.S. interference at Fort San Carlos, Spain ceded Florida. The proclamation of the Adams-Onis Treaty officially transferred to the United States both East Florida and what remained of Spanish claims in West Florida on February 22, 1821, two years after its signing in 1819. That was also the year that Mexico gained independence from Spain.

The U.S. Army made little use of the fort and soon abandoned it. Subsequently, the island was privately developed as plantations by white planters using the labor of enslaved Black people.

=== During the American Civil War ===
In the days before the American Civil War, Confederate sympathizers calling themselves the Third Regiment of Florida Volunteers took control of Fort Clinch on January 8, 1861. This was two days before Florida seceded. Located on the north end of the island, it had been under construction. Federal workers abandoned the site. Confederate General Robert E. Lee visited Fort Clinch in November 1861 and again in January 1862 during a survey of coastal fortifications.

Union forces restored Federal control of the island on March 3, 1862. They had 28 gunboats commanded by Commodore Samuel Dupont. The island attracted slaves to the Union lines, where they gained freedom. By 1863 there were 1200 freedmen and their children, and 200 people of European descent living on the island. This was one of numerous sites where freedmen congregated near Union forces.

In 1862 Secretary of War Edwin M. Stanton had appealed to northern abolitionists for aid in caring for the thousands of freedmen who camped near Union forces in areas of South Carolina and Florida. Among those who responded was Samuel J. May of Syracuse, New York, who organized a "Freedman's Relief Association" in the city. Funds were raised to support two teachers on Amelia Island; one was Chloe Merrick of Syracuse. She went to the island, where she taught the freedmen, established a school and orphanage in 1863, and raised continued aid in Syracuse for clothing and supplies for the poor of the island. She continued her support for education and welfare in the whole state after marrying Governor Harrison Reed of Florida in 1869. By 1872 about one-quarter of school-age children were being served by new public schools.

== Events ==
Amelia Island is host to the annual Isle of Eight Flags Shrimp Festival (with more than 150,000 people visiting each May), the Amelia Island Jazz Festival, the Amelia Island Chamber Music Festival, the Amelia Island Film Festival, the automotive charitable event Amelia Island Concours d'Elegance and the Amelia Island Blues Festival. Amelia Island was the main filming location for the 2002 John Sayles-directed film Sunshine State. The New Adventures of Pippi Longstocking was also filmed there in 1988.

Amelia Island hosted a Women's Tennis Association tournament for 28 years (1980 to 2008). From 1987 to 2008 it was known as the Bausch & Lomb Championships.

Since 2009 Amelia Island has hosted the annual Pétanque America Open of the game of pétanque, a form of boules.

=== Golf ===
Amelia Island has five golf courses:

- Oak Marsh Course
- Long Point Course (The Amelia Island Club)
- Golf Club of Amelia Island
- Amelia River Golf Club
- Fernandina Beach Golf Club
