= Governor Hedges =

Governor Hedges may refer to:

- John Hedges (British governor) (fl. 1760s), Acting Governor of British East Florida in 1763
- William Hedges (colonial administrator) (1632–1701), Governor of Bengal Agency from 1681 to 1684
