= Jacksonville Courier =

Newspaper

The Jacksonville Courier was a newspaper in Jacksonville, Florida (East Florida) from 1835 to 1839 and is the first known paper established in Jacksonville. It was edited by Elijah Williams.

It was established by Williams and Lorenzo Currier. They were from Massachusetts. It was succeeded by the East Florida Advocate.

It was a weekly paper. It reported on the first known school established in Jacksonville. David Brown also served as editor of the paper and was rector at St. Johns Church.
