= List of governors of Spanish Honduras =

This is a list of Colonial Governors of Honduras. The first governor who ruled this colony was Álvaro de Saavedra Cerón between 1525 and 1526, although Honduras was not conquered and pacified until 1536 by Pedro de Alvarado.

During Honduras's colonial period, the territory went through three periods: In the first (1525 – 26 Jun 1787), the people who ruled Honduras were recognized as Governors. In the second period (26 June 1787 – 1812), Honduras was ruled by so-called Governor-Intendants, while in the third period (4 February 1812 – 28 September 1821), Honduras was ruled from Guatemala. So, the people who ruled Honduras in this period were Mayors.

== Governors ==
- Álvaro de Saavedra Cerón (d. 1529): 1525 – 27 October 1526
- Diego López de Salcedo: 27 October 1526 – 1530
- Andrés de Cerezeda (d. c.1540): 1530 – 1532 (1st time)
- Diego Alvítez: 1532
- Andrés de Cerezeda: 1532 – 1535 (2nd time)
- Francisco de Montejo: 1535 – 1540 (1st time)
- Diego Garcia de Celis: 1541 – 1542
- Francisco de Montejo: 1542 – 1544 (2nd time)
- Juan Pérez de Cabrera: 1552 – 1555
- Pedro de Salvatierra: 1555 – 1562
- Alonso Ortiz de Elgueta: 1563 – 1564
- Alonso Ortiz de Argueta: 1564 - 1567.
- Juan de Vargas Carvajal: 1567 – 1570
- Juan de Soto Pachón: 1570 - 1573
- Diego de Herrera: 1573 – 1577
- Alonso de Contreras Guevara: 1577 – 1582
- Rodrigo Ponce de León: 1582 – 1589
- Jerónimo Sánchez de Carranza: 1589 – 1594
- Rodrigo Ponce de León: (2º term) 1594 – 1602
- Jorge de Alvarado y Villafañe: 1602 – 1605
- Pedro de Castro: 1605 – 1608
- Juan Guerra de Ayala: 1608 – 1612
- García Garabito de León: 1612 – 1617
- Juan Lobato: 1617 – 1620
- Juan de Miranda: 1620 – 1625
- Pedro del Rosal: 1625 – 1632
- Francisco Martínez de la Ribamontan Santander: 1632 – 1639
- Francisco de Ávila y Lugo: 1639 – 1641
- Alonso de Silva Salazar: 1641 – 1643
- Juan de Bustamante Herrera: 1643 – 1644
- Melchor Alonso Tamayo: 1644 – 1647
- Baltasar de la Cruz: 1647 – 1650
- Juan de Zuazo: 1650 – 1668
- Juan Márquez Cabrera: 1668 – 1672
- Pedro de Godoy Ponce de León: 1673 – 1676
- Francisco de Castro y Ayala: 1676 – 1679
- Lorenzo Ramírez de Guzmán: 1679 – 1682
- Antonio de Navia y Bolaños: 1682 – 1687
- Sancho Ordóñez: 1689 – 1693
- Antonio de Oseguera y Quevedo: 1693 – 1698
- Antonio de Ayala: 1698 – 1702
- Antonio de Monfort: 1702 – 1705
- Gregorio de Salinas Varona: 1705 – 1709
- Enrique Longman: 1712 – 1715
- José Rodezno: 1715 – 1717
- Diego Gutiérrez de Argüelles: 1717 – 1727
- Manuel de Castilla y Portugal: 1727 – 1738
- Francisco de Parga: 1738 – 1741
- Tomás Hermenegildo de Arana: 1741 – 1745
- Luis Machado: 1745 – 1746
- Juan de Vera: 1746 – 1747
- Alonso Fernández de Heredia: 1747
- Diego de Tablada (interim): 14 junio 1747 – 1750
- Pedro Trucco (interim): 1750 – 1751
- Pantaleón Ibáñez Cuevas: 2 July 1751 – 1757
- Fulgencio García de Solís: 1757 – 1759
- Gabriel Franco (interim): 1759 – 1761
- José Sáenz Bahamonde: 1761 – 1769 (death)
- Juan Antonio González: (interim) 1769 – 13 May 1770
- Antonio Ferrandis (interim): 13 May 1770 – 1770
- Bartolomé Pérez Quijano: 1770 – 1775
- Agustín Pérez Quijano: 1775 – 1779
- Francisco Aybar: 1779 – 1783
- Juan Nepomuceno de Quesada y Barnuevo: 11 August 1783 – 26 June 1787

== Governor-Intendants ==
- Juan Nepomuceno de Quesada y Barnuevo: 26 Jun 1787 – 1789
- Alejo García Conde: 7 May 1789 – 1796
- Ramón de Anguiano: June 1796 – 1808
- Antonio Noberto Serrano y Polo (b. 1753 – d. 1820): 1804 – 1810 (acting for absent Anguiano)
- Carlos Castañón: 1810 – 1812

== Mayors ==
Since 1812, the Governors of Honduras became in Mayors, because Honduras was governed from Guatemala.

- José María Píñol y Muñoz: January 1812 – 4 Feb 1812 (acting for Castañón)
- Juan Francisco Marqués: 4 Feb 1812 – 1 Mar 1812
- Pedro Gutiérrez: 1 Mar 1812 – Apr 1812
- Juan Antonio de Tornos: Apr 1812 – 1818
- José Gregorio Tinoco de Contreras (b. c.1780 – d. 18..): 1818 – 21 Nov 1821
- Juan Nepomuceno Fernandez Lindo y Zelaya (acting) (b. 1790 – d. 1857): 21 November 1821 – 28 September 1822

== See also ==
- List of presidents of Honduras
