= Fulgencio García de Solís =

Governor of Spanish Florida(acting) Governor of Honduras

37th Governor of Florida
- In office June 3, 1752 – April 18, 1755
- Preceded by: Melchor de Navarrete
- Succeeded by: Alonso Fernández de Heredia

53rd Governor of Honduras
- In office 1757–1759
- Preceded by: Pantaleón Ibáñez Cuevas
- Succeeded by: Gabriel Franco

Personal details
- Born: Unknown
- Died: Unknown
- Profession: Governor

Fulgencio García de Solís was the acting Governor of Florida from 1752 to 1755, and Governor of Honduras from 1757 to 1759.

== Career ==
Fulgencio García de Solís was appointed acting governor of La Florida on June 3, 1752. In 1752, García rebuilt Fort Mose, which had been accidentally destroyed in 1740 when a Spanish force consisting of colonial troops, Indian auxiliaries, and free black militia attacked James Oglethorpe's troops, who were occupying the fort during the Siege of Fort Mose in Saint Augustine. They defeated the British decisively and destroyed the fort in the process; García rebuilt the installation to serve as a settlement for black people, including escaped slaves from the British colonies to the north, seeking freedom in Saint Augustine, the capital of Florida. One of his goals was to try to cut off communications between former slaves and the rest of the population.

García condemned both the original settlers of Mose as well as slaves from the Carolinas who had fled to Florida, considering them culturally and spiritually backward, and ordered the black people of St. Augustine to rebuild Fort Mose at a new site north of the city. In this way, runaway slaves from Carolina living in St. Augustine were forced to help the soldiers and citizens build the fort. However, Solis encountered resistance by the freed slaves of the city, who said they feared attacks by pro-British Indians, but he believed this indicated they actually wanted to be completely free; nonetheless, they were forced to work on the fort. Solis lightly punished two leaders of the protest who promised not to return to the Carolinas and punished all those who decided to return, threatening worse punishment to any who continued to resist. Eventually García effected both the resettlement of the outpost and its fortification.

García de Solís served as interim governor of Florida until April 18, 1755. In 1757, he was appointed governor of Honduras, a position he held until 1759.
