= Bartolomé Morales =

Cuban politician

3rd Spanish Governor of East Florida
- In office March 1796 – June 1796
- Preceded by: Juan Nepomuceno de Quesada
- Succeeded by: Enrique White

Personal details
- Born: 1737 Algeciras, Cádiz (Andalusia, Spain)
- Died: unknown
- Spouse: María of Medina Barsaga Soledad
- Profession: lieutenant colonel and Political

Bartolomé Félix Morales y Ramírez (1737 - date of death unknown) was a lieutenant colonel of the Spanish infantry who served as lieutenant governor in Holguín, Cuba, and briefly as an interim governor of East Florida (March 1796 - June 1796). As commandant of the third battalion of Cuba, he was appointed to posts in the Cuban cities of Bayamo, Cobre and Holguín (1763 to 1774), and commanded the Spanish garrison in St. Augustine, Florida.

== Early years ==
Bartolomé Morales was born in 1737 in Algeciras in Andalusia, Spain, but grew up in Seville. He held a commission as staff assistant in the infantry Regiment of Navarre, which was integrated with the Córdoba Regiment. Sometime before 1763, Bartolomé fought against the Muslims in Ceuta.

== Florida government ==
Morales was promoted to captain in 1790. The following year he was promoted to colonel by King Charles IV of Spain, and made commandant of the Third Battalion Cuban Regiment garrisoned at the Castillo de San Marcos in St. Augustine, Florida, which was then a unit of the Captaincy General of Cuba. He arrived there with his daughter Rita Josefa and his grandson Félix Varela, aged two, whose mother, Maria Josefa Ignacia (daughter of Morales,) had died a few days after giving birth.

In March 1796, Morales, accompanied by royal auditor Gonzalo Zamorano, was appointed to the post of acting governor of East Florida while Governor Enrique White was recovering from an illness, and left it in June of that year when White recovered and returned to office.

During Morales's time as governor, Spanish East Florida was concerned with Georgia's Camden County's failure to curb advancement of "Georgia bandits" on the Florida frontier.

== Personal life ==
On May 17, 1766, Bartolomé married María Medina Barsaga Soledad, the daughter of one of his subordinates, Sergeant Pedro Medina Barrios, whom he met in 1764 when he was sent to Cuba. Barrios was a small landowner engaged in the production of snuff in the town of Santiago del Prado, where the El Cobre cathedral was located. Bartolomé took up residence there and adopted local folk customs, one of which was devotion to the Virgen Morena, Our Lady of Charity, namesake of the cathedral and linked to Cuban religious tradition.

The couple had three daughters in Santiago: Maria Josefa Ignacia, Rita Josefa, and Maria Josefa Morales. The eldest daughter died a few days after giving birth to her son Félix. Consequently, Félix (1788-1853) was raised mostly by his aunt Rita.

After serving as commander in Florida, Bartolomé settled there in 1790 with his daughter Rita and infant grandson, Félix Varela. Bartolomé wanted his grandson to go into the military, and when the boy reached age 14, proposed that he enroll as a cadet in a military academy. Félix refused, saying that his vocation was not to kill people, but to save them, and asked permission to enter a seminary to become a priest. Father Félix later became an important figure in the history of Latin America. The Father Felix Varela Center in Jacksonville, Florida, belonging to the Diocese of St. Augustine, Florida, is named for Bartolomé's grandson, Félix Varela.
