= Gregorio de Salinas Varona =

Spanish administrator and noble

2nd Governor of Texas and 4th of Coahuila
- In office 1692 – 1697 (Texas) / 1698 (Coahuila)
- Preceded by: Domingo de Terán de los Ríos
- Succeeded by: Francisco Cuervo y Valdés

23rd Governor of Nuevo León
- In office 1705–1707
- Preceded by: Francisco Báez Treviño
- Succeeded by: Cipriano García de Pruneda

40th Governor of Spanish Honduras
- In office 1705–1709
- Preceded by: Antonio de Monfort
- Succeeded by: Enrique Longman

Governor of Pensacola
- In office 1709–1718
- Preceded by: Unknown
- Succeeded by: Unknown

Personal details
- Born: 1647 or 1650 Tormé, Burgos Province, Spain
- Died: 1720 Mexico City, New Spain, Spanish Empire
- Profession: Governor

Gregorio de Salinas Varona (1647 or 1650 in Tormé, Burgos, Spain – 1720 in Mexico City, New Spain, Spanish Empire) was a noble and Spanish administrator who served as governor in Texas, Nueva Extremadura, New Spain, Nuevo Leon (the latter two localized in Mexico), Honduras and Pensacola. He was from Burgos and was descended from a noble family of civil servants with roots in the towns of Salinas de Rosío and Medina de Pomar.

== Family origins ==
Gregorio de Salinas Varona is the founder of the Mexican branch of his house. His great grandnephew, Anselmo Manuel de Salinas Varona, father of Antonio Salinas y Castañeda, founded another New World branch in the Viceroyalty of Peru, where his descendants became influential.

He was the son of Francisco de Salinas Varona, an Escribano Real residing in Torme. Francisco died on 18 October 1683. His mother was Magdalena Ruiz, who was originally from the town of Bisnela.

== Biography ==
Gregorio was born in 1647 or 1650 in Burgos. He entered the army at a very young age and managed to attain rapid promotion. He served for a period of 19 or 24 years in Spanish controlled Flanders. In 1687, he was made a Capitán de Infantería (Infantry Captain) and sent to New Spain in the service of Viceroy Melchor Portocarrero Lasso de la Vega, Count of Monclova. His son, Alonso de Salinas Varona accompanied Gregorio to New Spain.

Soon after his arrival in New Spain, he was sent to the Gulf of Tehuantepec to lead Spanish forces against pirates and smugglers in the region. At the time, pirates had taken control of much of New Spain's Pacific coast.

In 1690, the new Viceroy, Gaspar de la Cerda, Count of Galve, sent Gregorio on a mission to explore the region of Tejas (Texas) together with the explorer Alonso de León who would go on to also become governor of Nuevo León. The expedition also constituted the escorting of four Franciscan friars to found their first mission in Texas called San Francisco de los Tejas.

In 1691, by royal decree, he was granted the title of Comandante del Presidio de San Francisco de Coahuila. Later in the same year, he was sent to accompany an expedition run by Domingo Terán de los Ríos to extend Spanish missions into Eastern Texas.

In 1692, he was named 2nd Governor of Texas and 4th of Coahuila, a post that he held until 1697 and 1698 respectively. During his tenure in Coahuila, he extended the scope and presence of missions and concentrated on colonizing the local Indians.

In 1705, he was appointed the Governor of the Nuevo Reino de León, a post that he held for two years until 1707.

He was later named Governor of Honduras, a post that he held until 1709 when he was made the colonial Governor of Pensacola. He held his post as Governor of Pensacola until 1718 when he was replaced by Captain Matamoros de Isla.

He was made Governor of the Presidio de Santa María de Galve, likely in 1718 after his tenure in Pensacola.

== Death ==
Gregorio de Salinas Varona died in 1720 or shortly after that date in Mexico City.

== Bibliography ==
- Some of the information on this page was translated from its Spanish version.
- Archivo General de Indias, Archivo General de Indias de Sevilla (Madrid, 1958).
- Jay Higginbotham, Old Mobile: Fort Louis de la Louisiane, 1703–1711 (Mobile, Alabama: Museum of the City of Mobile, 1977).
- Robert S. Weddle, The French Thorn: Rival Explorers in the Spanish Sea, 1682–1762 (College Station: Texas A&M University Press, 1991).
- Pedro Salinas, "De Torme a Sayan, los Salinas en el Peru" (Editorial San Marcos, Lima, 2011. 149 p.)
