= John Hedges (British governor) =

English politician

John Hedges was the first acting governor of British East Florida, serving in this office from 20 July to 30 July, 1763. He obtained the keys of the city of Saint Augustine, Florida, at Castillo de San Marcos, from the hands of the former Spanish governor Melchor Feliú, and governed the province until the arrival of Francis Ogilvie.

Hedges arrived in St. Augustine with four companies of the British 1st Regiment from Havana, Cuba.
