= Amelia City, Florida =

Unincorporated community in Nassau County, Florida, United States

Amelia City is an unincorporated community in Nassau County, Florida, United States. It is located in the southern half of Amelia Island, on A1A near the Amelia River.

== Geography ==
Amelia City is located at 30°35′25″N 81°27′26″W.
