= Melchor de Navarrete =

Spanish soldier and administrator

64th Governor of Cartagena
- In office 1739–1742
- Preceded by: Pedro Fidalgo
- Succeeded by: Basilio de Gante

37th Royal Governor of La Florida
- In office August 8, 1749 – June 3, 1752
- Preceded by: Manuel de Montiano
- Succeeded by: Fulgencio García de Solís

76th Colonial Governor of Yucatán
- In office 1754–1758
- Preceded by: Juan José de Clou
- Succeeded by: Alonso Fernández de Heredia

Personal details
- Born: January 17, 1693 Briones, Calahorra, La Rioja (Spain).
- Died: August 28, 1761 (aged 68) Cartagena de Indias (Colombia)
- Spouse: María Micaela de Sanz y de la Roche
- Profession: Politician and soldier

Melchor de Navarrete y Bujanda (1693–1761) was a Spanish soldier and administrator who served as governor of Cartagena de Indias (in what is now Colombia), from 1739 to 1742; of Spanish Florida from 1749 to 1752; and of Yucatán (in what is now Mexico), from 1754 to 1758. He was linked to several cases of corruption in Cartagena.

== Biography ==
=== Early years and government in Cartagena ===
Melchor de Navarrete was born on January 17, 1693, in the town of Briones, Spain, to Francisco Navarrete, the governor of Briones, and Josefa Bujanda y Bañuelos. His siblings were Javier and Teresa de Navarrete y Bujanda. He joined the Spanish Royal Army in his youth and eventually became a field marshal.

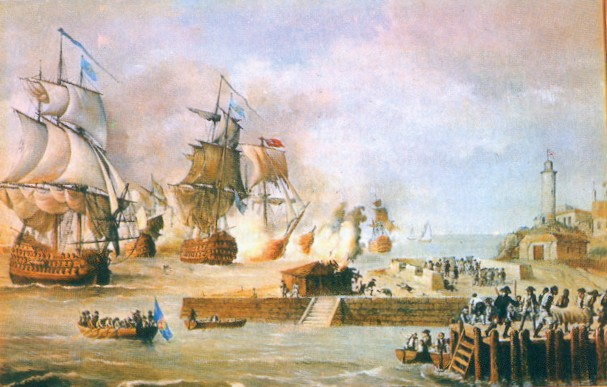
Navarrete defended Cartagena in the Battle of Cartagena de Indias.

In 1736, Navarrete moved to Cartagena to become the King's Lieutenant. Three years later, after the death of Governor Pedro Hidalgo, he was appointed acting governor of the city, in charge of administration and food supply, while Admiral Blas de Lezo held the military command. In 1740, Navarrete entered the Order of Santiago and was promoted to the rank of field marshal in the Spanish Royal Army. In 1741, he participated in the Battle of Cartagena de Indias, fighting against British Admiral Edward Vernon, who attempted to capture the city's fortress. Navarrete was accompanied by Admiral de Lezo and Viceroy of New Granada Sebastián de Eslava, a lieutenant general in the Spanish Royal Army.

In June, Navarrete wrote a letter to the Marqués de la Ensenada asking him to ensure that food was sent to Cartagena. In July, the city received 100,000 pesos from duties on commerce. In 1742, Navarrete was charged with several crimes by the officers of the Royal Treasury, who demonstrated that Navarrete had given commercial information to a French trader, Jean Lehen Brignon, advising him how to avoid paying royalties on a shipment worth 15,000 pesos, and suspected that Navarrete had taken the commission for himself. In response to these accusations, Viceroy Eslava replaced Navarrete as acting governor of Cartagena with Brigadier Basilio de Gante, and rejected Navarrete's petition to recover his office. The viceroy also suspended Navarrete as royal lieutenant.

However, Navarrete's wife belonged to one of the most important merchant families in Cartagena, and in 1749, he got enough money to be appointed governor of Florida. He also regained his position as lieutenant to the king, until he left to assume his new office as governor. In spite of this, Colonel Diego de Pino, a smuggler who belonged to Cartagena's elite society, accused Navarrete of several criminal offenses: he had married after the king denied him a marriage license; when the British attacked Cartagena, he had forced more than 500 residents to leave the city; and he had allowed a frigate carrying 200,000 pesos of contraband into port in exchange for 8,000 pesos. Viceroy Eslava, who feared that his opponents, the mariners of the Marqués de la Ensenada's political party, would try to prevent him from continuing in office as viceroy of Peru (which later happened) allowed Navarrete and his wife to travel to Florida.

=== Government of Florida and Yucatán ===
On August 8, 1749, Navarrete was appointed governor of Spanish Florida. While in office, he provided evidence of fugitive slaves leaving British Southern colonies for Florida. His correspondence of April, 1752 documented the baptism of fourteen fugitive enslaved persons living at Fort Mose. Fort Mose, inhabited mainly by free blacks, served St. Augustine as a buffer from Indian and British attacks. Navarrete left Florida office on July 3, 1752.

In 1752, he was admitted as a knight of the Order of Santiago. In 1754, he was appointed governor and captain general of the Mexican provinces of Yucatán, Cozumel, and Tabasco. During his tenure in Yucatán, complaints were raised about the forced labor of the Mayas, the indigenous people of the peninsula, who were enslaved by encomenderos and forced to raise cotton. Navarrete defended the position of the encomenderos and forced the Mayan chiefs to write a declaration that was forwarded to the Council of the Indies and King Ferdinand VI. They approved the declaration, and the forced work continued.

Navarrete participated in a military campaign against privateers who had attacked the Yucatán coast in 1754. Ships and fleets came from Mexico City, Campeche, Bacalar, Honduras, and Havana to take part in the campaign. The Spanish troops conquered Valis, captured many ships and soldiers, and burned all privateer settlements they found, although Valis was later retaken by the British, and privateer attacks continued).

Also during Navarrete's administration, the town council of Campeche requested permission to build a powder magazine away from the town plaza, where fires were frequently started by summer lightning storms. The powder magazine was completed in 1758, the same year that Navarrete finished his term in Yucatán. After that, he returned to Cartagena, where he died on the evening of August 28, 1761.

== Personal life ==
On May 28, 1740, Navarrete married María Micaela de Sanz y de la Roche. They had three children: María Antonia, María Josefa, and María Francisca de los Dolores.
