= Carlos Howard =

Irish soldier and governor of Spanish West Florida

2nd Governor of West Florida
- In office November 1792 – August 1793
- Preceded by: Arturo O'Neill
- Succeeded by: Enrique White

Personal details
- Born: c. 1738
- Died: Unknown
- Profession: Military career, Governor of Spanish West Florida

Carlos Howard (c. 1738 - ?) was an Irish-born military officer who served as Governor of West Florida (in Pensacola), between 1792 and 1793. Prior to that appointment, he served as secretary and general administrative assistant to the East Florida Governor Vicente Manuel de Céspedes y Velasco, in St. Augustine.

== Biography ==
He joined the Spanish army in his youth, attaining the rank of captain. He was part of the Irish Infantry Regiment, and later joined the Regiment of Louisiana, where he attained the rank of lieutenant colonel.

Eventually he emigrated to Florida, where he became secretary of the Governor Vicente Manuel de Céspedes y Velasco. He also served as general administrative assistant.

Cespedes sent a message to Howard to “prepare the Anglo-American residents of the province for a change of masters”. This was in reference to the regime change from two decades of British rule to a resumption of Spanish authority. Howard sent information about Georgia to St. Augustine.

In November 1792, Howard was appointed Governor of West Florida, where he established a small militia among the settlers on the Nassau and St. Marys Rivers. He left the office in August 1793.

In June 1795, American rebel marauders led by Richard Lang attacked the Spanish garrison on Amelia Island. Colonel Howard, once again an officer in the Spanish military, discovered that the rebels had built a battery and were flying the French flag. On August 2, he raised a sizable Spanish force, sailed up Sisters Creek and the Nassau River, and attacked them. The rebels fled across the St. Marys to Georgia.

== Personal life ==
Howard spoke English, French and Spanish.
