= Alonso Fernández de Heredia =

Governor of Yucatán (died 1782)

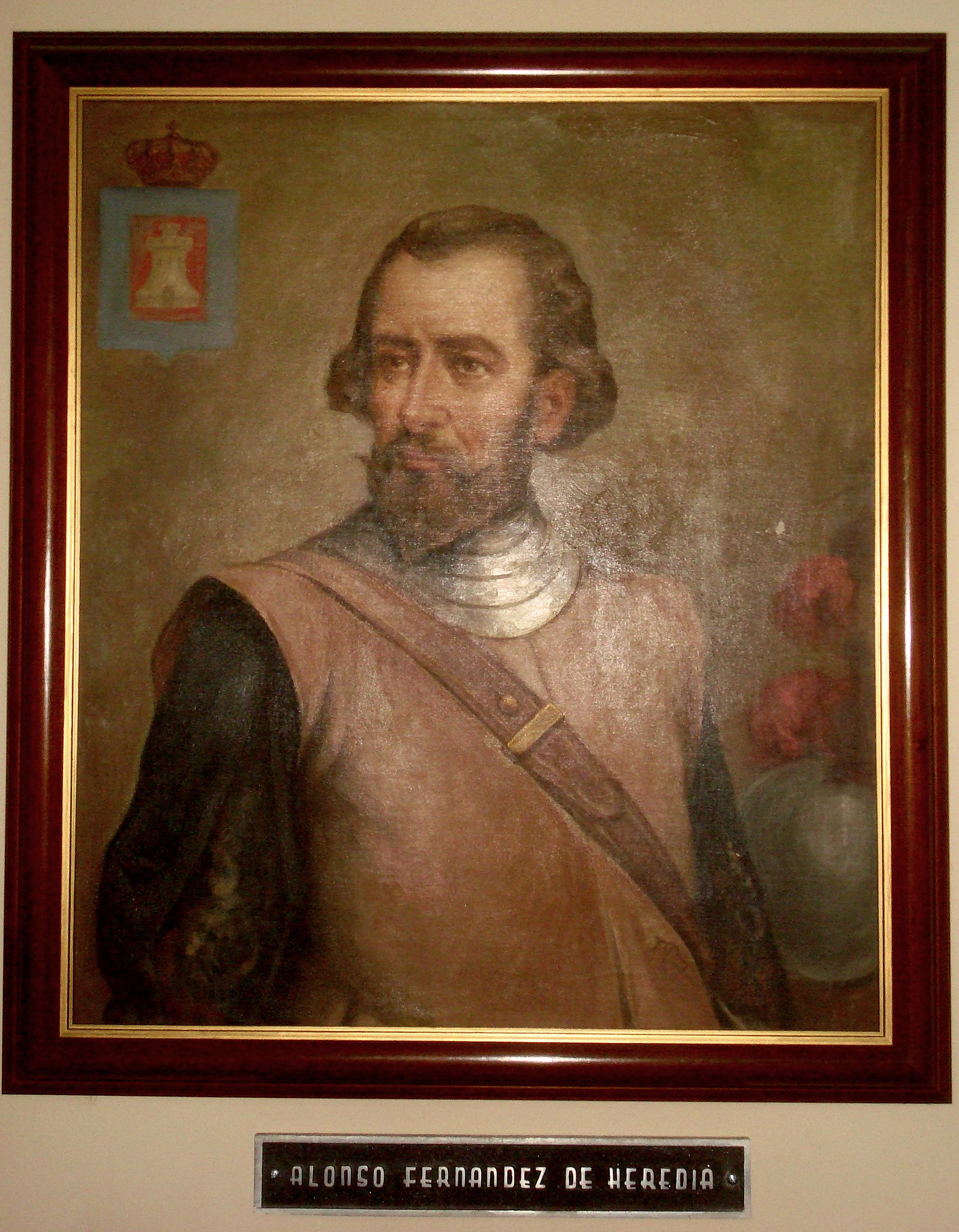

49th Governor of Honduras
- In office 1747 – 1747 (Heredia only served one year in the government)
- Preceded by: Juan de Vera
- Succeeded by: Diego de Tablada

39th Royal Governor of La Florida
- In office 18 April 1751/55 – 21 April 1758
- Preceded by: Fulgencio García de Solís
- Succeeded by: Lucas Fernando Palacios

77th Colonial Governor of Yucatán
- In office 1758–1761
- Preceded by: Melchor de Navarrete
- Succeeded by: Jose Crespo y Honorato

37th Governor of Guatemala
- In office 1761–1771
- Preceded by: Juan de Vera
- Succeeded by: José González Rancaño

40th Governor of the Nicaragua province
- In office 1761–1771
- Preceded by: Juan de Vera
- Succeeded by: José González Rancaño

Personal details
- Born: c. first half of 1700s Cetina, Zaragoza, Spain
- Died: March 19, 1782 Guatemala City
- Spouse: Elena Marin de Villanueva e Hijar
- Profession: Captain General and politician

Alonso Fernández de Heredia (died March 19, 1782) was a Spanish Captain General and administrator who governed Honduras (1747), Florida (1751–1758), Yucatan (in modern-day Mexico; 1758–?), the Captaincy General of Guatemala (1761–1771) and Nicaragua (1761–1771).

== Biography ==
Alonso Fernández de Heredia was born in Cetina, Zaragoza, Spain, in the first half of the 18th century. He was the son of Antonio Fernandez de Heredia y Liñan Altarriba, 2nd Count of Contamina, and of Beatriz Ximenez de Cerdan y Gurrea, 2nd Marquesa de Barboles. He was a captain in the Spanish army and later a Field Marshal of the royal armies. In 1749, he was involved in a well-known smuggling case of the time; twenty nine years later, he was sentenced along with other accused participants. Heredia, like the other persons accused of smuggling, had fought against the British and promoted a plan to defend Spanish possessions on the Atlantic Coast.

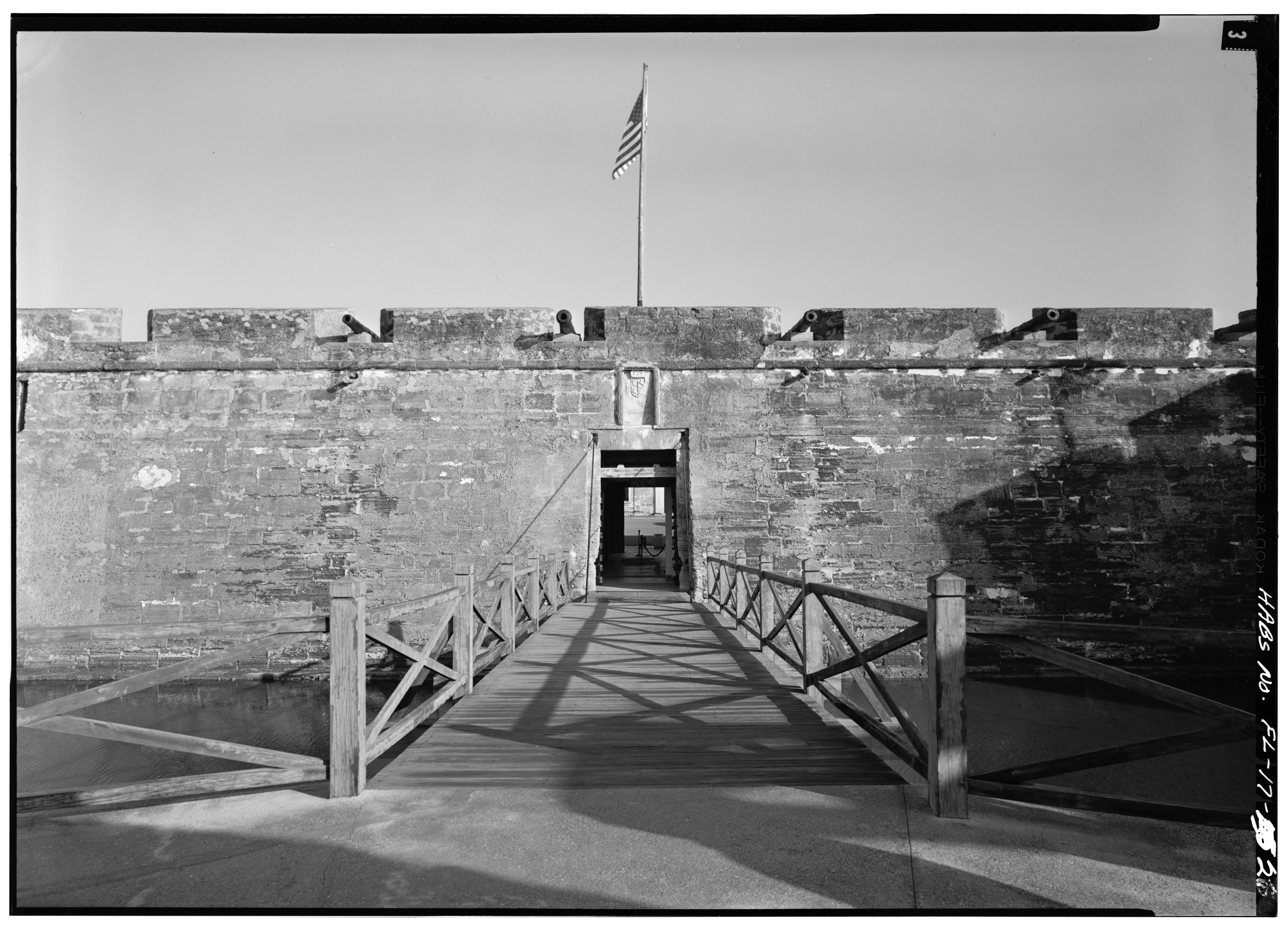
The last modifications made to the Castillo de San Marcos during Heredia's administration were the drawbridge and portcullis, with a plaque of the Spanish royal coat-of-arms above them, built at the fort's entrance in 1756.

Two years later, in 1751 (or on 18 April 1755, according to some sources), he was appointed governor of Florida, where he established a naval stores industry. The last substantial modifications of the Castillo de San Marcos under Spanish rule had begun in 1738, and were concluded in 1756 during his governorship with the construction of a drawbridge and portcullis at the fort's sally port entrance, as well as a plaque of the Spanish royal coat-of-arms above them.

On the other hand, the Florida population grew under Heredia's administration when 363 agricultural settlers from the Canary Islands, Spain, arrived in St. Augustine in October 1757. The Spanish authorities had conceived a plan to repopulate the province with groups of Spanish settlers, and altogether the Spanish crown sent 154 families hailing from the Canary Islands to Florida between 1757 and 1759. Heredia's term as governor of Florida ended on April 21, 1758, when he was appointed to serve as governor of Yucatan, Mexico.

Among his accomplishments in Yucatan, Heredia published a royal decree which exempted Indian women from all taxes and ordered several modifications to the fortification of Campeche.

On June 14, 1761, Heredia was sent to Guatemala to become its Captain General. He soon requested the Spanish crown to create a viceroyalty of Guatemala, pointing to the region's development of large cattle ranches and sugar cane, fruit and cocoa plantations, as well as the higher development of its cities, but the request was rejected. The same year, he was also appointed governor of Nicaragua (although according to some sources, he was actually governor of Nicaragua between 1746 and 1753) and acting governor of Honduras. His government in Honduras implemented a series of changes such as the reorganization of the tax code and an extension of state jurisdiction in social sectors. These initiatives met great success due to the goodwill he had cultivated with the provincial bureaucracy in his previous positions. Heredia was also able to improve relations with local government, including more efficient processing of applications by the people of Tegucigalpa. On March 12, 1768, he left the Captaincy General of Guatemala. Heredia also was recognized by the construction of Tegucigalpa in the construction of Omoa, where many people died due to the harsh climate of the region and his difficulty in adapting to it.

Heredia died on March 19, 1782, in Guatemala City.

== Personal life ==
Alonso Fernández de Heredia married the 3rd Countess San Clemente Elena Marin de Villanueva e Hijar, with whom he had one daughter, Maria Magdalena Fernandez de Heredia y Marin de Villanueva.
