= Juan Nepomuceno de Quesada =

Spanish governor

Juan Nepomuceno de Quesada y Barnuevo

61st Governor of Spanish Honduras
- In office 11 August 1783 – 1789
- Preceded by: Francisco Aybar
- Succeeded by: Alejo García Conde

2nd Governor of Spanish East Florida
- In office July 1790 – March 1796
- Preceded by: Vicente Manuel de Céspedes y Velasco
- Succeeded by: Bartolomé Morales

Personal details
- Born: 1738; Jaen, Andalusia (Spain)
- Died: 1798
- Profession: Military officer and administrator (governor of Honduras and East Florida)

Juan Nepomuceno de Quesada y Barnuevo Arrocha (1738–1798) was a military officer who served as Governor and intendant of Honduras between 1783 and 1789, and Governor of East Florida from July 1790 to March 1796.

== Early life ==
De Quesada was born in 1738 at Jaén, Spain. He joined the Spanish Royal Army in his youth, attaining the ranks of Brigadier of the Infantry of the Royal Armies and Commander General of the presidio of St. Augustine.

== Political career ==
De Quesada was appointed Governor and intendant of Honduras in 1783, and remained in this office until 1789, when he was replaced in the Honduran government by Alejo García Conde.

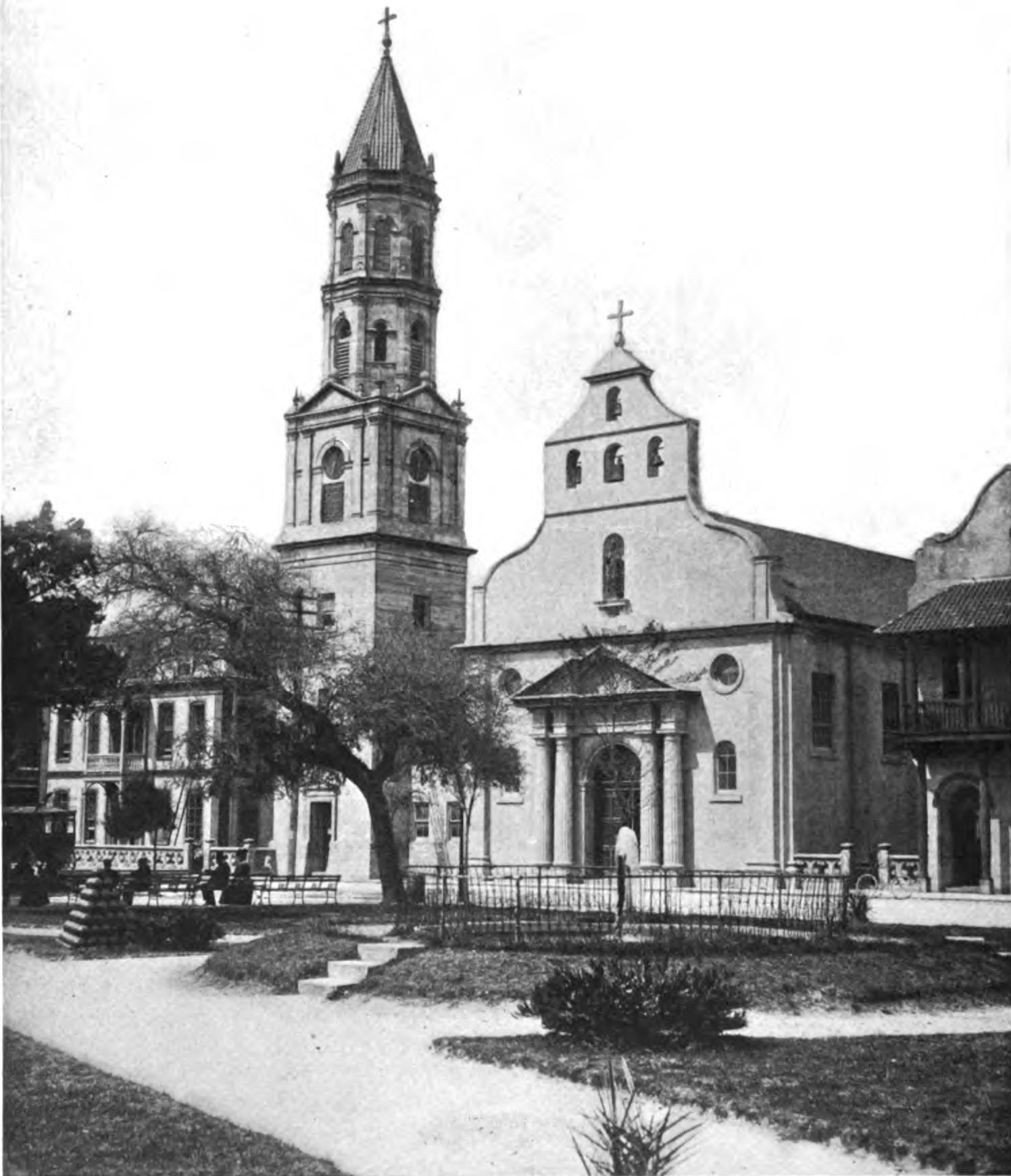
Photo of the Cathedral of St. Augustine, 1914.

In 1790 De Quesada was appointed Governor of East Florida by Charles IV of Spain, to replace Vicente Manuel de Céspedes. He assumed the governorship in July 1790, during the Nootka Sound Crisis. Upon his appointment, De Quesada wrote to George Washington informing the president of his new position in Florida and offering his diplomatic friendship to the United States.

After his arrival at Saint Augustine, as a consequence of the Nootka Crisis, De Quesada revamped the defenses of the city, which were not extensive enough, according to him and his engineer, Mariano de la Roque. The garrison was small and dispirited, as the Spanish royal subsidy (situado) had not arrived in Florida since 1787.

In the course of his service as governor of the province, De Quesada also obtained the titles of Vice Royal Patron, and Subdelegate of St. Augustine and the province. Construction of the Cathedral was begun in 1793 under his administration and finished in 1797, a year after he left his post.

=== Slavery ===
De Quesada banned the recognition of runaway slaves who had fled from the American South to Florida seeking freedom. He had corresponded with Thomas Jefferson in 1791 on the matter of fugitive slaves coming from the southern United States. Through commissioner James Seagrove of Georgia, De Quesada wrote a letter initiating the agreement that stated any American slaveowner immigrating to Florida simply had to swear that they were the legitimate owners of the enslaved person for their ownership to be recognized.

== Death ==
He became ill in February 1796, and continued to serve as governor of East Florida only until March of that year, when he was succeeded by Bartolomé Morales. He died in 1798.
