= Francis Ogilvie (British Army officer) =

British Army officer

Francis Ogilvie was a British Army officer who served as interim governor of East Florida from 30 July 1763 to 29 August 1764.

Commissioned into the 9th Regiment of Foot, Ogilvie served in Cuba, and was then posted to Saint Augustine, Florida, where he held the highest military title among the members of the city's military garrisons.
