= Enrique White =

Spanish colonial governor

3rd Governor of West Florida
- In office May 1793 – May 1795
- Preceded by: Carlos Howard
- Succeeded by: Francisco de Paula Gelabert

4th Governor of East Florida
- In office June 1796 – March 1811
- Preceded by: Bartolomé Morales
- Succeeded by: Juan José de Estrada

Personal details
- Born: 1741 Dublin, Ireland
- Died: April 13, 1811 (aged 69–70) San Agustín, Spanish East Florida, Spanish Empire
- Profession: Military officer and Governor of Florida

Enrique White (1741 - April 13, 1811) was an Irish-born Spanish soldier who served as Governor of West Florida (May 1793 – May 1795) and of East Florida (June 1796 - March 1811).

== Biography ==
Enrique (Henry) White was born in Dublin, Ireland. He later immigrated to Spain, where he served the Spanish Crown from age 22 until his death. White joined the Spanish Royal Army, eventually rising to the rank of colonel. In 1779 he was appointed commander of the third battalion of the Louisiana Infantry Regiment, with the title Sargento Mayor (Sergeant Major). serving several times in that capacity, and eventually attained the rank of brigadier.

On May 15, 1793, White was appointed acting Governor of West Florida, and remained in the position until June 1795.

White was appointed Governor of East Florida in the spring of 1796, and arrived in its capital, Saint Augustine, on June 5. He assumed his duties on June 20. Construction of the cathedral of St. Augustine, initiated by his predecessor Bartolomé Morales, was completed the next year in 1797. It was in January 1797 that Governor White received news that Spain was at war with England (Anglo-Spanish War). This conflict would last until 1802 and was part of the larger Napoleonic Wars in Europe.

New construction was encouraged in St. Augustine during White's governorship, with numerous new houses being built. The military preparedness of the city and its fortifications were strengthened. The garrison's morale improved as well with better conditions. White was very strict in granting the concession of lands from the public domain, and often enforced the laws more rigorously than the legal code itself would allow.

In 1799, English corsairs took Amelia Island along the much contested Florida-Georgia border. Officials in Georgia's Camden County corresponded with White whenever American fugitives crossed the southern border fleeing the law.

== Illness and death ==
White fell ill in 1800, and was temporarily replaced by Lt. Col. Bartolomé Morales, who had previously served as acting governor of East Florida (March 1796 - June 1796), accompanied by Gonzalo Zamorano, Commissary of the army and accountant of the royal finance. White recovered from his illness in 1801 and resumed his office, remaining in that position until March 1811, when he fell ill again and died on April 13 of that year in St. Augustine. He is buried in Tolomato Cemetery in St. Augustine.

== Personal life ==
Governor White never married. He owned several slaves, who gained their freedom when he died.

== Legacy ==
In 1811, White officially named a town on Amelia Island "Fernandina," in honor of the Catholic monarch Ferdinand VII of Spain. This renaming followed Napoleon's invasion of Spain and the Court's exile.

The street running east and west in Fernandina called "White Street" was named after Enrique White.
