= Alonso de Cárdenas (governor of Spanish Florida) =

Alonso de Cárdenas was the governor of Florida between 1761 and 1762

When he was young, he joined the Spanish Army and became sergeant major. In 1761 he was named governor of Florida until March 1762, when Melchor Feliú appointed himself to it because Juan de Prado, governor of Cuba, rejected Cárdenas. He is interred at cemetery of Campo Santo.
