= Vicente Manuel de Céspedes =

Spanish governor of the 18th century

Vicente Manuel de Céspedes y Velasco

1st Governor of Spanish East Florida
- In office June 27, 1784 – July 1790
- Preceded by: Patrick Tonyn (in the British East Florida)
- Succeeded by: Juan Nepomuceno de Quesada y Barnuevo

Personal details
- Born: 1721? Valencia, Spain
- Died: 1794 Cuba
- Spouse: Concepción Basabe Arostegui
- Profession: Governor

Vicente Manuel de Céspedes (1721?–1794), also known as Vicente Manuel de Zéspedes, was a Spanish colonel and field marshal in the Spanish Royal Army who served as governor of Santiago de Cuba (1781–1782) and the Spanish province of East Florida (1784–1790).

== Early life ==
Vicente Manuel de Céspedes y Velasco was born in Valencia, Spain, probably in 1721. His paternal grandfather, José de Céspedes, was a lieutenant general in the Spanish Royal Army and Governor of Rosalcazár in Oran, (Algeria), and his maternal grandfather, Martín Arostegui Larrea, was a Knight of Santiago (1750) in Spain. He joined the Spanish Royal Army in his youth, attaining the rank of colonel and field marshal.

Céspedes married Maria de la Conception Basabe Arostegui on July 22, 1754, in the Cathedral of Havana, Cuba.

== Political career ==
In 1781, Céspedes was elected acting governor of Santiago de Cuba, but this assignment lasted only until 1782.

In 1783, he was appointed Governor of East Florida by Bernardo de Gálvez, assuming the office on June 27, 1784. On July 12, British Governor Patrick Tonyn turned over the Castillo de San Marcos to Céspedes, which marked the end of the British regime in East Florida and the renewal of Spanish administration. Thus, many of the British who had migrated there during British rule of the province moved to the British colonies in the Caribbean. At the same time, many blacks insisted on remaining in Spanish Florida, taking advantage of the Spanish policy that provided sanctuary for those who were Roman Catholic or who intended to convert to that religion. Many of these individuals were former slaves, and Céspedes was dubious that their religious convictions were legitimate. Still, while he believed they simply sought to escape their forced servitude, he had no choice but to honor the policy.

Céspedes proposed that all the vacant property in St. Augustine should be confiscated by the Crown for distribution to returning Floridanos. He also recommended that the King impose time limits for the repossession of unoccupied property to avoid confusion when the former proprietors or their heirs asserted their claims. Céspedes wanted to register all legitimate proprietorships purchased from such realtors during the British Period; by this means he hoped to forestall disruption of the traditional real estate system in St. Augustine. Following the Spanish exodus of 1763, twenty years of British rule, and the retrocession of Florida to Spain in 1784, Céspedes faced many problems concerning the disposition of property. His manner of addressing them was expeditious and suitable to the complex situation in St. Augustine.

Céspedes began to attract settlers to East Florida, granting them lands, exemption from taxes for ten years, and delivery of cash bonuses.

He especially promoted the emigration of settlers who were not of Spanish origin to East Florida. A group of impoverished settlers who had come to Florida from the Canary Islands were transported to St. Augustine from Pensacola in 1786. Their efforts at agricultural self-sufficiency disappointed Céspedes. 1787 onwards saw many non-Catholic Anglo-Saxons venturing to East Florida. Newcomers swore allegiance to the Spanish Crown, but refused to convert to Catholicism.

In 1784, Céspedes ordered a census taken of East Florida, although only a partial draft of it is preserved. In 1786, still under the Céspedes administration, priest Thomas Hassett conducted another more detailed census, to learn the population of the province. The complete draft of this census, unlike the previous one, has been preserved.

== Diplomacy & Exploration ==
Céspedes, along with the British military officers stationed in the Floridas, asked the Spanish king, King Charles III, that the British merchants William Panton (of the trading firm Panton, Leslie & Company) and Mathew and Strother (of the namesake company) be allowed to stay in the Floridas, maintaining that they prevent American Indian attacks against the Spanish garrisons, undersell the price of goods sold by the Americans, and help keep the Floridas under Spanish dominion. After their trade commissions were authorized in 1786, these merchants could legally maintain their commercial relations with Native Americans.

Alexander McGillivray, a Creek diplomat and trader, wrote to Céspedes in 1789 after walking out on talks with United States representatives in Georgia. McGillivray was convinced the United States sought to expand southward into Spanish territory, and remarked he was pleased to have the Spanish as an ally.

Céspedes gave botanist André Michaux permission to explore East Florida in search of new species of plants. He had great success in his enterprise. Céspedes was replaced by Juan Nepomuceno de Quesada y Barnuevo as governor of the province in July 1790.

Vicente Manuel de Céspedes died on October 21, 1794, and was buried in the Cathedral of San Cristóbal in Havana.

== Legacy ==
According to American botanist Asa Gray (1810–1888), the flowering plant genus, "Lespedeza", was named in honor of Céspedes, who had written a letter giving André Michaux permission to explore East Florida in search of new species of plants. When Michaux´s book Flora Boreali-Americana was printed in 1802, the name "de Céspedes" was misspelled as "de Lespedez", from which was derived the current botanical name of the plant, "Lespedeza".
