= East Florida =

Colony in North America (1763–1822)

- 1763–1822
- Left: Red Ensign of Great Britain; Right: Flag of the Spanish Empire

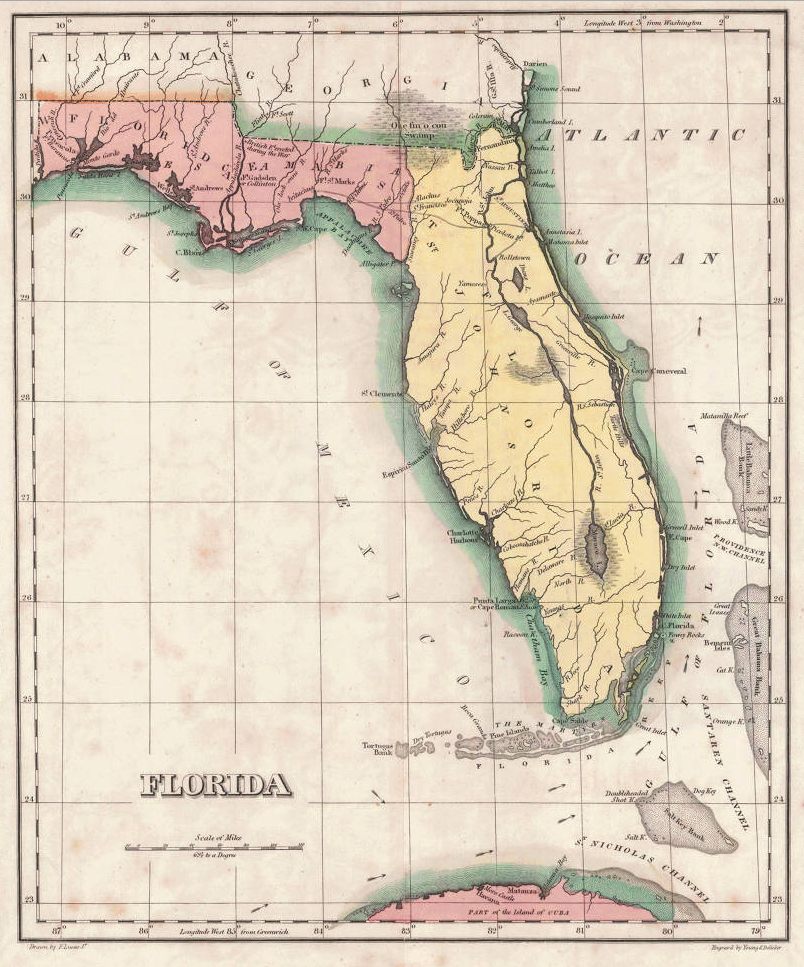
- Under Spanish rule, East Florida and West Florida were divided by the Suwannee River. (H. Carey & Lea)
- Status: Colony of Great Britain (1763–1783); Colony of Spanish Empire within the Viceroyalty of New Spain (1783–1821); Provisional military government of the United States (1821–1822)
- Capital: St. Augustine
- Governor
  - 1763–1784: 5 under Britain
  - 1784–1821: 8 under Spain
  - 1821: 1 U.S. military commissioner
- History
  - Treaty of Paris: 10 February, 1763
  - Transferred to Spain: 25 November 1783
  - Adams–Onís Treaty: 1821
  - Merged into Territory of Florida: 30 March, 1822
Preceded by	Succeeded by
Spanish Florida	Territory of Florida

East Florida (Spanish: Florida Oriental) was a colony of Great Britain from 1763 to 1783 and a province of the Spanish Empire from 1783 to 1821. The British gained control over Spanish Florida in 1763 as part of the Treaty of Paris that ended the Seven Years' War. Deciding that the colony was too large to administer as a single unit, British officials divided Florida into two colonies separated by the Apalachicola River: the colony of East Florida, with its capital located in St. Augustine; and West Florida, with its capital located in Pensacola. East Florida was much larger and comprised the bulk of the former Spanish colony and most of the current state of Florida. It had also been the most populated region of Spanish Florida, but before control was transferred to Britain, most residents – including virtually everyone in St. Augustine – left the territory, with most migrating to Cuba.

Britain tried to attract settlers to the two Floridas without much success. The sparsely populated colonies were invited to send representatives to the Continental Congress but chose not to do so, and they remained loyal to Great Britain during the American Revolutionary War. However, as part of the 1783 treaty that ended the American Revolutionary War and marked Britain's defeat, Britain ceded both Floridas to Spain. The two colonies remained separate, and their boundary was shifted eastward to the Suwannee River.

By the early 1800s, Spain had shown little interest in, and limited capacity for, administering either of the two Floridas beyond their capital cities. American settlers entered the territory without authorization, provoking conflict with the Seminoles, a new Native American culture formed largely by Indigenous refugees from the American Southeast. During the War of 1812, American forces occupied West Florida. American settlers calling themselves the "Patriots" declared the short-lived and unrecognized Republic of East Florida at Amelia Island. The U.S. government soon renounced this action and ordered the return of the occupied land to Spain.

Border disputes between the United States and the Seminoles tribes in Florida continued after the war. By 1817, much of Spanish West Florida had been occupied and annexed by the United States; the territory later became parts of Louisiana, Alabama, and Mississippi. After a decade of escalating border disputes and American incursions, Spain ceded both Floridas to the United States in the Adams–Onís Treaty of 1819. The United States formally took possession in 1821, in exchange for renouncing any claims to Spanish Texas. In 1822, all of East Florida and the remaining portions of West Florida were merged into a single Florida Territory, with borders closely resembling those of the present-day state of Florida.

== British period ==
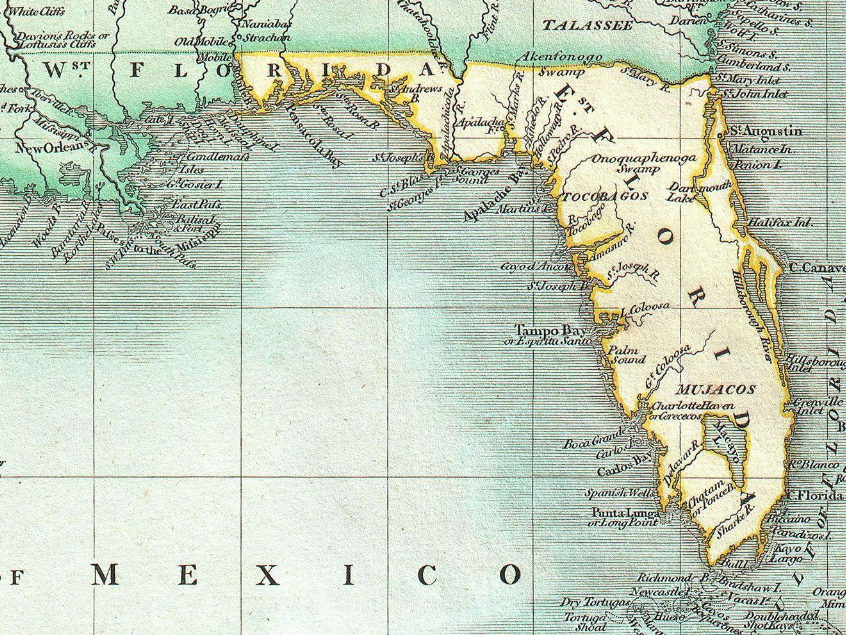
Excerpt of 1803 map by John Cary showing East and West Florida, limited by the United States' claim to part of Spain-controlled West Florida

Under the terms of the 1763 Treaty of Paris, which ended the Seven Years' War (the French and Indian War), Spain ceded Spanish Florida to Britain. At the same time, Britain received all of French Louisiana east of the Mississippi River, with the exception of New Orleans, from France. Determining the new territory too large to administer as one unit, Britain divided its new southeastern acquisitions into two new colonies separated by the Apalachicola River: East Florida, with its capital in the old Spanish city of St. Augustine, and West Florida, with its capital at Pensacola. However, in the Spanish evacuation most of the population departed following the signing of the treaty, with the entirety of St. Augustine emigrating to Cuba.

The settlement of East Florida was heavily linked in London to the same interests that controlled Nova Scotia. The East Florida Society of London and the Nova Scotia Society of London had many overlapping members, and Council frequently followed their suggestions on the granting of lands to powerful merchant interests in London.

Perhaps it is strange to think of such dissimilar geographic areas with such opposing climates as having much in common. But if one considers naval and military strategy, one can see that these areas have a common significance, especially when viewed from London by the ministry. Halifax (Nova Scotia) was the command post for both the admiral and general in charge of the American forces.... St. Augustine evoked the same strategic considerations. These posts have been described as the two centers of strength to which the British Army was withdrawn in the late 1760s.

The apportionment of lands in the new colonies fell to the same group of English and Scottish entrepreneurs and merchant interests, led chiefly by the Scottish slave trader Richard Oswald and the British general James Grant, who would later become governor of East Florida. A list of the grantees in both Florida and Canada shows that the plums fell to a well-connected—and inter-connected—group. Lincoln's Inn barrister Levett Blackborne, grandson of Sir Richard Levett, a powerful merchant and Lord Mayor of London, came in for grants of 20,000 acres (81 km^{2}) in both locales, for instance. Other aristocrats, nobles, and merchants did the same.

The most powerful lubricant between the East Florida speculators and the Nova Scotia speculators was Col. Thomas Thoroton of Flintham, Nottinghamshire. Thoroton, the stepbrother of Levett Blackborne, had married an illegitimate daughter of the Duke of Rutland and often lived at Belvoir Castle, where he acted as principal agent to the Duke, who, along with his son, the Marquis of Granby, were heavily involved in overseas ventures. Thoroton frequently acted as the go-between for Richard Oswald and James Grant, particularly after those two gave up their Nova Scotia Grants to focus on East Florida, where a drumbeat of steady speculation (particularly from Andrew Turnbull and William Stork) had fanned the flames of interest in London. It was not until March 1781 that the Governor of East Florida, Patrick Tonyn, called elections for a provincial legislature.

East Florida remained loyal to Great Britain during the American Revolution. The colony became a haven for Loyalist refugees and fugitive slaves fleeing to British lines from the Southern Colonies during the American War of Independence, and several military units were established by Loyalists in East Florida.

Spain participated indirectly in the war as an ally of France and captured Pensacola from the British in 1781. In the 1783 Treaty of Paris, which ended the war, the British ceded both Floridas to Spain. The same treaty recognized the independence of the United States, directly to the north.

=== Government ===
"Governor of British East Florida" was an appointed position. A legislative council did exist which shared power with the governor. The governor could appoint officials but they needed to be approved by the British government. These positions included: an attorney general, chief justice, coroner, etc. An official could be suspended but needed to get the council's consent. A court relating to maritime cases, the East Florida Court of Vice Admiralty was created in April 1771. The British province of East Florida had a royal seal, as did the province of West Florida. The seal for East Florida had on one side a depiction of a fortified town and harbor with the Latin motto Moresque Viris et Moenia Ponet ("He will establish customs for men, and walls").

=== Demography ===
==== Racial demographics ====
During the period of British rule in East Florida, the black population came to outnumber the white population in the province by a ratio of 2 to 1. The ratio of blacks to whites in East Florida was lower than in British West Florida but higher than in the other southern British colonies. Those who were white in Florida generally served in the military or worked as overseers, artisans, or merchants. There were very few white yeomen farmers. White residents generally lived in or around St. Augustine with an exception being generally made for overseers and those who resided in New Smyrna. Due to the poor treatment of Minorcans in New Smyrna, some left for St. Augustine, where a large number of them lived in a section of the city known as the "Minorcan Quarter" or the "Greek Quarter".

==== Population and other characteristics ====
It is unclear what the population of East Florida was prior to the American Revolution but it is estimated to have had a population of close to 3,000, making it much larger in population than West Florida, which is believed to have had only several hundred residents. The British tried to encourage settlement in East and West Florida, thinking it would take pressure off the proclamation line that colonists in the northern British colonies wanted to move beyond. However, this plan was generally unsuccessful as many of those who got land grants did not end up settling on those lands. By 1783 the population of East Florida was about 17,000. St. Augustine was about 0.75 miles (1.21 km) long and 0.25 miles (0.40 km) wide in size.

During the American Revolution, East Florida sided with the British and became a loyalist haven. With the end of the Revolution and the handing over of both Floridas to the Spanish, many loyalists were hesitant to leave. In the end, most of the loyalist and British residents, approximately 10,000 people, left with most of these going to the Bahamas or West Indies and some going to Nova Scotia and England. Another 4,000 people "melted away into the wilderness", with some going as far away as the Mississippi River.

A town named St. Johns Bluff or St. Johns Town was laid out in 1779 along the St. Johns River. The planned community was the first town to be established on the river. Most of those who fled to Florida settled at that town and St. Augustine. St. Johns Bluff became a port and had 300 houses in it by the spring of 1783. With the end of the British period, it was renamed as St. Vincent Ferrer before it was eventually abandoned. A settlement named Rollestown was established by Denys Rolle 30 miles (48 km) southeast of St. Augustine, on the east shore of the St. Johns River, south of Deep Creek.

St. Augustine, the capital of the colony, was much smaller and less advanced than the capitals of the other Thirteen Colonies.

=== Slavery and economics ===
East Florida did not establish a formal slave code until 1782. Those who were black or of mixed race of European and African origin and could not prove they were free were considered to be slaves. During the American Revolution, many Georgians and Carolinians moved to Florida along with their slaves. The colonial government, along with slave-owners, used slaves to construct defensive fortifications. A militia act that allowed for conscripting slaves as laborers and soldiers was passed in 1781.

Goods produced in and exported from East Florida included sugar, timber, indigo, rice, naval stores, and barrel staves; most of these goods came from plantations along the St. Marys and St. Johns rivers that used slave labor. The primary harbor was located in St. Augustine, which had more ship traffic than Pensacola. Most commerce flowing into and sailing from East Florida went via St. Augustine. Ships leaving or entering St. Augustine almost always were destined to or departed from Charleston, South Carolina, but occasional ships did come directly from Europe. Nevertheless, the amount of traffic in St. Augustine was smaller than that of the ports to its north, Savannah and Charleston. For example in 1768, 56 ships entered St. Augustine compared to Savannah's 148 and Charleston's 448 ships.

Bernard Romans wrote the first account of Spanish fishing ranchos existing along Florida's southwest coast in 1770. When the British took control of Florida, they monitored the fishermen who occupied the ranchos but let them continue their activities. Governor James Grant was ordered to stop the fishermen from operating but did not enforce that order. At one point the fishing boats were suspected of being a threat to British control, but a complete review in 1767-68 found they were harmless.

=== Media ===
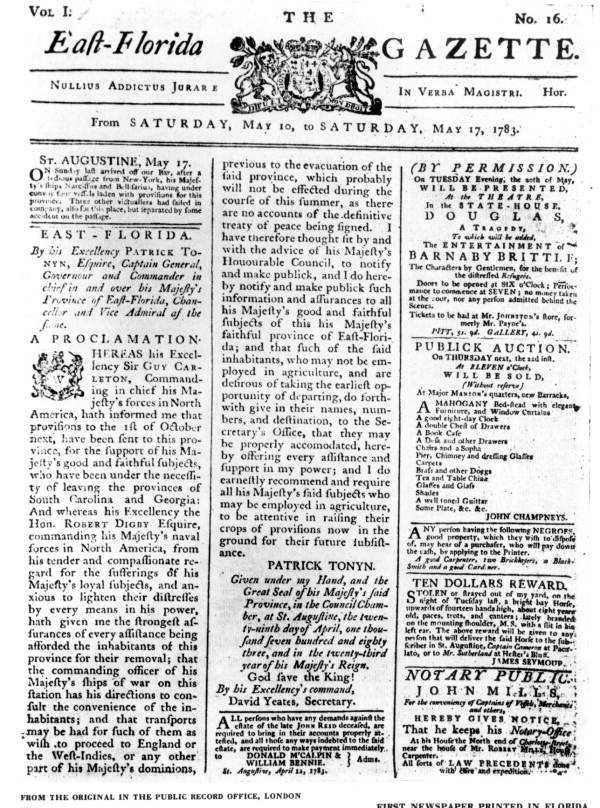
Front page of the East Florida Gazette (Volume 1, no 16), a pro-loyalist newspaper

The East Florida Gazette was a pro-loyalist newspaper that was published weekly in St. Augustine from 1783 to 1784. It was founded by a loyalist printer, John Wells, and his brother, William Charles Wells, who had moved to St. Augustine from Charleston, South Carolina. The paper was printed "'...at the Printing-office in Treasury-lane'". Prior to the establishment of a newspaper, most news came into St. Augustine through gazettes that were published in Savannah, Georgia, and Charleston.

The Wells brothers also published two books: Nature and the Principles of Public Credit, by Samuel Gale, along with The Case of the Inhabitants of East Florida, written by John Wells himself. In 1783, another printer named David Zubly, who was a loyalist refugee from Savannah, Georgia, printed the first book in the colony, a copy of John Tobler's Almanack, at his home.

== Spanish period: Florida Oriental ==
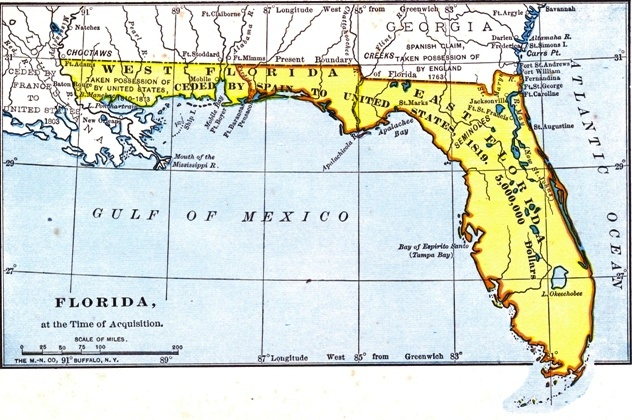
Map of East and West Florida in 1819, the year that Spain ceded Florida to the United States by the Adams–Onís Treaty (ratified 1821)

Under Spanish rule, the provinces of East Florida and West Florida initially remained divided by the Apalachicola River, the boundary established by the British. However, Spain moved it eastward to the Suwanee River in 1785.

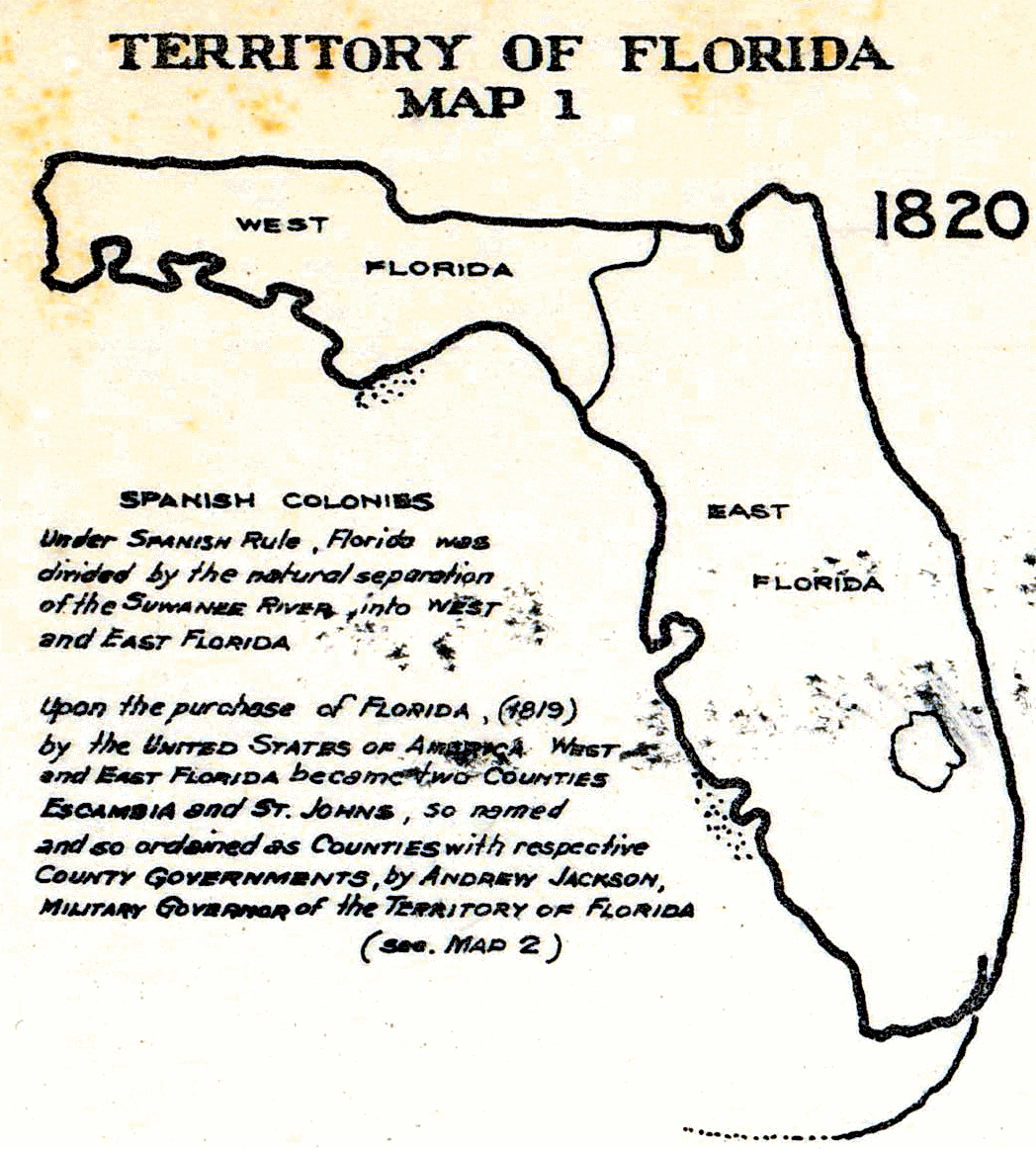
"Under Spanish rule, Florida was divided by the natural separation of the Suwanee River into West Florida and East Florida." – University of Florida

Spain continued to administer East and West Florida as separate provinces. The Spanish offered favorable terms for acquiring land, which attracted many settlers from the newly formed United States. There were several territorial disputes between the U.S. and Spain, some resulting in military action, including the Patriot War in 1812 and the filibuster at Amelia Island in 1817.

An American army under Andrew Jackson invaded East Florida during the First Seminole War. Jackson's forces captured San Marcos on 7 April 1818; as well as Fort Barrancas at West Florida's capital, Pensacola, on 24 May 1818.

James Monroe's secretary of state, John Quincy Adams, defined the American position on this issue. Adams accused Spain of breaking Pinckney's Treaty by failing to control the Seminoles. Faced with the prospect of losing control, Spain formally ceded all of its Florida territory to the U.S. under the Adams–Onís Treaty in 1819 (ratified in 1821), in exchange for the U.S. ceding its claims on Texas and the U.S. paying any claims its citizens might have against Spain, up to $5,000,000.

In 1822, the U.S. Congress organized the Florida Territory, merging East Florida and the portion of West Florida that had remained under Spanish control until 1821. In 1845, Florida was admitted as the 27th state of the United States.

=== Population and demographics ===
With the transfer of Florida to Spain, a number of former British subjects decided to stay while some Spaniards came to Florida. St. Augustine had a mix of both residents from the British period and newly arrived Spaniards. The rural areas settled by colonists were described as being "exclusively Anglo". During the Spanish period, the population of St. Augustine "hovered" at about 3,000 people, with half of its population being black slaves. There were nine Native American towns in Florida, but those towns were not counted in the 1786 census. In 1786, St. Augustine had a population of about 950 people, 300 of whom had some degree of African descent whether they were enslaved or not.

=== Economics ===
With the return of the Spanish, the system of plantation agriculture developed in the colony during the British period remained. Although the production levels were not as high as other British colonies, cash crops like indigo, hemp, and rum made in Spanish East Florida led to economic growth there. As a result, St. Augustine became less dependent on the royal situado (royal financial payments for support). Trade became less restrictive during the second Spanish period as the Spanish monarchies enacted reforms allowing for trade between Spanish and non-Spanish areas, which benefited St. Augustine.

St. Augustine was the largest port on the Atlantic Ocean south of Charleston. Ships would travel often to Charleston, South Carolina and Cap Français in Haiti where goods were traded and crews learned the latest news as well. East Florida became economically dependent on the United States after Spain started to align with France and declared war on the British in 1796; as a result British trade largely stopped. Charleston began to surpass Havana as St. Augustine's biggest trading partner while Savannah, Philadelphia and New York City had become trading partners with the city. East Florida exported oranges, lumber and cotton to the United States while fish, grain and foodstuffs were imported from the United States.

Spain was concerned about the Haitian Revolution, fearing that ideas of independence could be spread to their own colonies, including Florida, with Governor Quesada doing his best to follow the Spanish government's policy of prohibiting interactions with French possessions, "...forbidding the introduction of French ideas, books, citizens, or slaves originating from French possessions."

== Governors ==
=== List of governors of East Florida ===
Name	Term	Notes
John Hedges	20 Jul 1763 – 30 Jul 1763	capital at St. Augustine (acting governor)
Francis Ogilvie	30 Jul 1763 – 29 Aug 1764	acting governor
James Grant	29 Aug 1764 – 9 May 1771	Considered the inaugural governor.
John Moultrie	9 May 1771 – 1 Mar 1774	
Patrick Tonyn	1 Mar 1774 – 12 Jul 1784	
Vicente Manuel de Céspedes y Velasco	12 July 1784 – July 1790	capital at St. Augustine
Juan Nepomuceno de Quesada y Barnuevo	July 1790 – March 1796	
Bartolomé Morales	March 1796 – June 1796	acting governor
Enrique White	June 1796 – March 1811	
Juan José de Estrada	March 1811 – June 1812	Patriot War with U.S.
Sebastián Kindelán y Oregón	June 1812 – June 1815	Patriot War with U.S.
Juan José de Estrada	June 1815 – January 1816	
José María Coppinger	January 1816 – 10 July 1821	First Seminole War with U.S.

== See also ==
- George Mathews (Georgia), Patriot War of East Florida (1812)
- Mosquito County, Florida
- Spanish colonization of the Americas
