= Republic of the Floridas =

1817 failed military adventure against Spain

Green Cross of Florida flag, also used as flag of Poyais.

The Republic of the Floridas, also called Republic of Floridas, was a short-lived attempt, from June to December 1817, to establish an independent Florida (the plural "Floridas" refers to the separate provinces of East Florida and West Florida, then claimed by Spain and partially occupied by the United States). It was led by Gregor MacGregor, a Scottish military adventurer, and he was joined by French adventurer and soldier of fortune Louis-Michel Aury and by the Scot Richard Ambrister, whose execution by General Andrew Jackson shortly thereafter provoked an international incident. MacGregor conquered Amelia Island, the only territory the country consisted of, and raised the Green Cross of Florida flag over the Spanish Fort San Carlos.

== Background ==
Starting with the American Revolution, Florida was sought after by the United States. What had begun as a Spanish colony, Florida became a British holding from 1763 until 1783 when, with the Treaty of Paris, it was once again returned to Spain. During those twenty years, and after, the Florida territory became a haven for British loyalists, Native Americans, and run-away slaves. Many citizens and politicians in the United States feared this haven and wished to bring Florida under control in order to protect the southern border. Aside from increasing pressure from the United States, Spain's empire was weakened, thanks to the Napoleonic war and, more particularly, the Peninsular War, and increasingly losing control of its territories, including Florida. According to a letter written at the time, Spanish East Florida had only three military establishments; a garrison of about 200 men at St. Augustine, roughly 80 men at a place called the Cow Ford (now Jacksonville) on the St. Johns River, and "50 or 60 invalids" at Amelia Island.

Tensions between the two countries, and the inhabitants who lived on either side of the border, escalated and led to a number of conflicts. These conflicts included an insurrection in West Florida in 1810 and an unsuccessful attempt at a coup by the self-described Patriots in 1812 in East Florida.

== Preparation by Gregor MacGregor ==
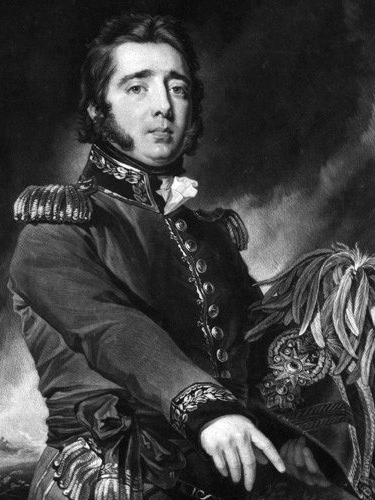
Gregor MacGregor

Gregor MacGregor was a Scotsman who had fought during the Peninsular War before heading to South America and fighting for the revolutionaries in the Spanish American wars of independence. He was also a confidence trickster and likely viewed the annexation of Florida as a worthwhile investment. On top of land investments, MacGregor also wished to become a governor in Florida, to further increase his prestige and wealth.

In early February 1817, MacGregor arrived in Baltimore, Maryland, and began to gather political and financial support to “wrest Florida from Spain” and embolden “the existing disposition of the people in that section to confederate with the United States” until a more “favorable time for their admission into the Union.” He intended to use a private force so that the United States could add Florida to its holdings while avoiding responsibility for an invasion. He also had commissions and claimed to be fighting on behalf of Venezuela and Mexico, further obfuscating his intentions and that of the United States. MacGregor eventually gathered a force of roughly 150 men, mostly from Charleston. Some were veterans from the War of 1812 but most were simply mercenaries. Before taking his small force down into the Florida territory, MacGregor sent an agent in disguise to sow fear amongst the citizens of Amelia Island and the garrison at Fort San Carlos. The agent spoke of an "army of 1,000 men" that would easily sweep aside the defending troops. The propaganda worked and many citizens fled their homes before MacGregor had even embarked on his campaign.

== Invasion and occupation of Amelia Island ==
On June 29, 1817, MacGregor and his men sailed into the harbor at Fernandina at the northern end of Amelia Island. After disembarking, MacGregor and 55 musketeers surrounded Fort San Carlos and the garrison surrendered without a shot fired. Following the capture of the fort, MacGregor had the "Green Cross of Florida" flag run up and released the Spanish garrison, who brought the news of the fort's capture to Governor Coppinger. The governor, in turn, had the garrison's commander arrested for losing the fort without a fight. In July, a Spanish force advanced on Amelia island but was repulsed by the guns on MacGregor's vessels anchored in the harbor. However, as soon as MacGregor tried to deploy one of his ships out of Amelia Island, it was overtaken by a Spanish vessel and nearly all of the American crew were killed.

Due to setbacks, the revolutionary forces suffered from desertions and by August 1817 were reduced to less than one hundred men. At the same time, local citizens were becoming increasingly unwelcoming to MacGregor and his forces.

On September 4, 1817, two of MacGregor's officers resigned. Only two days later, MacGregor himself set sail from Amelia island on his own vessel. He said that his reason for leaving was to gather more recruits and funds from the Bahamas and Baltimore, yet he would end up never returning to the island. He left behind roughly forty men including a man named Jared Irwin, a former congressman, who was left in charge of the military and Ruggles Hubbard, a former sheriff from New York, who was named the civil leader. The "Republic" at Amelia was soon attacked again by the Spanish but managed to beat them back.

Shortly after the second failed attack by the Spanish, a French-born pirate named Louis-Michel Aury arrived and assumed military command, making Hubbard his adjutant-general. Within a short time, conflict and arose between the French and the American groups, leading to a growing mountain of issues on Amelia Island.

== End of the Republic ==
The United States government was becoming increasingly unhappy about the smuggling and privateering of the "Republicans of the Floridas." It believed that the occupation of Amelia Island by the men in question meant "that it would be used as a base from which to smuggle slaves and other merchandise into the U.S." to avoid the customs duties which were the main source of federal revenue.

On December 23, 1817, a U.S. army and naval forces overtook Amelia Island without resistance.

"It also shews that the Pseudo-Patriots of Fernandina were one day Americans and the next Floridians ; that there were to be found among them natives or subjects of all nations except Spain or Spanish America ; and that their true and sole object was booty."

President Monroe delivered to Congress on January 13, 1818, a Message from the President of the United States, communicating information of the troops of the United States having taken possession of Amelia Island, in East Florida. Its first sentence reads: "I have the satisfaction to inform Congress, that the establishment at Amelia Island has been suppressed, and without the effusion of blood." Monroe included "the papers which explain this transaction", consisting of the letters of Graham and Crowninshield, letters of Aury, and other documentation from Federal records.

== Legacy ==
On December 9, 1817, "first year of the independence of Floridas", there was printed in Fernandina the Report of the Committee Appointed to Frame the Plan of Provisional Government for the Republic of Floridas. It was reprinted privately in 1942 under the title Republic of the Floridas: Constitution and Frame of Government Drafted by a Committee Appointed by the Assembly of Representatives. The location of Fort San Carlos is now the Fernandina Plaza historic state park, operated by the Florida State park system.
