= Port of Fernandina =

Seaport in Nassau County, Florida

Fernandina
- Interactive map of Fernandina
- Location within the United States

Location
- Country: United States
- Location: Nassau County, Florida
- Coordinates: 30°40′52″N 81°27′44″W
- UN/LOCODE: USFEB

Details
- Operated by: Ocean Highway & Port Authority of Nassau County
- Owned by: Nassau County, FL
- Type of Harbor: Natural/Artificial
- No. of berths: 3
- Draft depth: 36 ft.

The Port of Fernandina is located on Florida's Atlantic coast. It is used for terminal service for pulp and paper as well as steel exports, machinery, auto parts, chemicals, beverages, chemicals, building materials and food products. Container lines from the port serve routes to Colombia, Venezuela, the Dominican Republic, Haiti, Jamaica, Aruba, Curaçao and Bermuda.

A deepwater port on Amelia Island has been used by traders and as a base for combatants going back several hundred years.

== History ==
The area's ports have been used by explorers and traders.

Fort San Carlos was built by Spaniards to defend the town and port area. On March 16, 1812 nine American gunboats under the command of Commodore Hugh Campbell formed a line in the harbor and aimed their guns at the town. General Mathews, who was ensconced at Point Peter on the St. Marys in Georgia, ordered Colonel Lodowick Ashley to send a flag to Don Justo Lopez, commandant of the fort and Amelia Island, and demand his surrender. Lopez acknowledged the superior force and surrendered the port of Fernandina and the town. John H. McIntosh, George J. F. Clarke, Justo Lopez, and others signed the articles of capitulation; the Patriots then raised their own standard at the flagstaff of the fort. The next day, March 17, a detachment of 250 regular United States troops were brought over from Point Peter, and the newly constituted Patriot government surrendered the town to General Matthews, who ordered the stars and stripes of the US flag raised immediately.

General Mathews and President Madison had conceived a plan to annex East Florida to the United States, but Congress became alarmed at the possibility of being drawn into war with Spain, and the effort fell apart when Secretary of State James Monroe was forced to relieve Matthews of his commission. Negotiations for the withdrawal of US troops began early in 1813. On May 6, the army lowered the flag at Fernandina and crossed the St. Marys River to Georgia with the remaining troops. Spain took possession of the redoubt and regained control of the island. The Spanish completed construction of the new Fort San Carlos to guard the port side of Fernandina in 1816. Louis-Michel Aury left Texas in 1817 to assist the Scottish adventurer Gregor MacGregor, self-styled "Brigadier-General of the United Provinces of the New Granada and Venezuela and General-in-Chief of the armies of the two Floridas", in attacking Spanish Florida from Amelia Island. MacGregor left the island on September 4, and Aury sailed into the Port of Fernandina Following negotiations with MacGregor's lieutenants, Ruggles Hubbard and Jared Irwin, Amelia Island was dubiously annexed to the Republic of Mexico on September 21, 1817, and its flag raised over Fort San Carlos. Aury surrendered the island to U.S. forces on December 23, 1817.

HMS Sappho was active in the port.

George J. F. Clarke moved his family to the port area on Amelia Island to take advantage of economic opportunities.

David Levy Yulee developed the Florida Railroad's eastern terminus at a port in Fernandina on Amelia Island.

Solicito Salvador (originally Salvadore Sollecito) (1869–1924) had a layover as a merchant seaman aboard an Italian freighter in the port during a hurricane and went on to help develop the area's shrimp industry. He is listed as a Great Floridian.

== See also ==
- Original Town of Fernandina Historic Site
- Fernandina Beach
