= George J. F. Clarke =

Spanish colonial official in Florida (1774–1836)

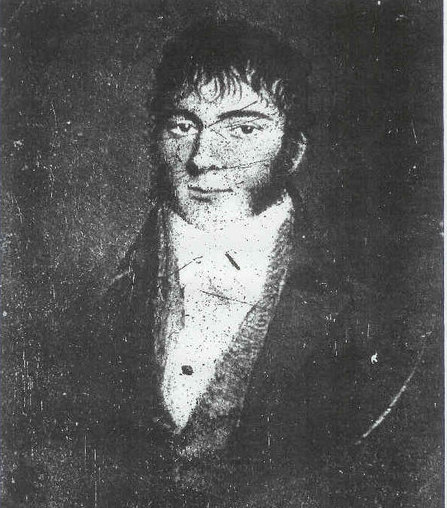
- Portrait of George J. F. Clarke

Surveyor General of East Florida
- In office 1811–1821
- Monarch: Ferdinand VII of Spain
- Governor: Enrique White, José Coppinger, others

Deputy Governor of East Florida
- In office c. 1816 – 1821

Personal details
- Born: October 12, 1774 St. Augustine, British East Florida
- Died: October 20, 1836 St. Augustine, Florida, United States
- Resting place: Probably Tolomato Cemetery, St. Augustine
- Spouse: Flora Leslie (common-law)
- Children: 12
- Parent(s): Thomas Clarke Sr. and Honoria Cummings
- Occupation: Surveyor, planter, militia officer, writer
- Known for: Platting Fernandina (1811); service as Surveyor General; writings on agriculture and Florida Indians

George J. F. Clarke (October 12, 1774 – 1836) was one of the most prominent and active men of East Florida (Spanish: Florida Oriental) during the Second Spanish period. As a friend and trusted advisor of the Spanish governors of the province from 1811 to 1821, he was appointed to several public offices under the colonial regime, including that of surveyor general.

Clarke served in the Spanish militia from 1800 to 1821, defending East Florida in the "Patriot War" of 1812 and leading militia forces against the freebooters Gregor MacGregor and Louis-Michel Aury in 1817. By the order of Governor Enrique White he platted the town of Fernandina in 1811 and oversaw the construction of new buildings there. He was a central figure in organizing a local government in the area between the St. Marys and St. Johns rivers, which brought a workable peace to that tumultuous section during the final years of Spanish rule.

Clarke supervised every land survey made in East Florida between 1811 and 1821, and profited from the acquisition and resale of large tracts of land; his landholdings were among the largest in Florida. In his will he distributed more than 33,000 acres to his heirs, as well as several houses and scattered lots. He spoke Spanish fluently, but his writing in the language was ungrammatical. His initials have been given incorrectly by many historians as I. F., confusion arising because the capital Is and Js of his handwriting were indistinguishable. His will shows his given name to have been George John Frederic Clarke.

In his later years, he invented a horse-driven sawmill, practical enough that the Spanish Governor José Coppinger gave him a "sawmill grant" of 22,000 acres of timbered land, although the customary such grant was for 16,000 acres. Clarke published his opinions on a wide array of subjects in the provincial newspaper, the East Florida Herald, including experimental agriculture, fruit tree cultivation, diet and health, archeology, and the white man's relations with the Indians.

== Early life ==
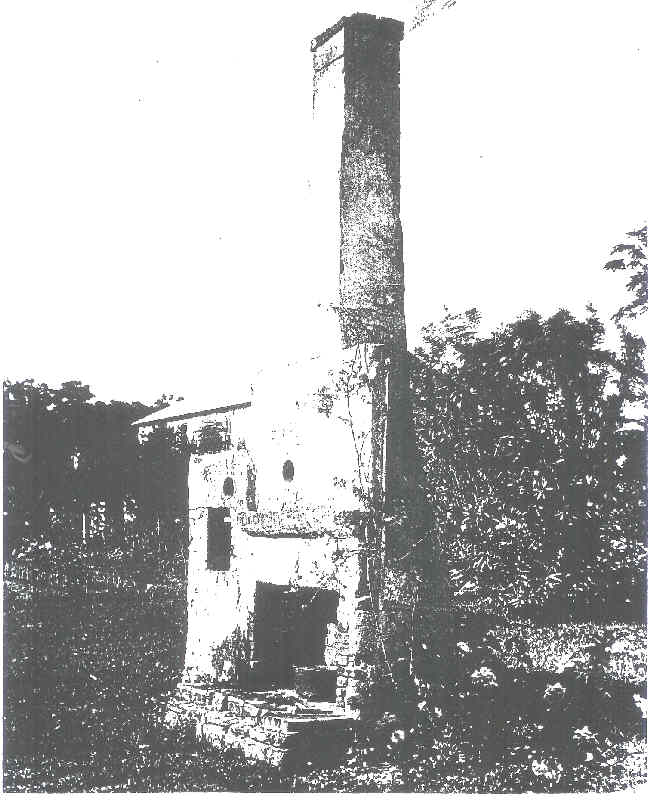
Remains of Honaria Clarke's house on St. Francis and Charlotte Streets in St. Augustine

Clarke was born a British colonial subject in St. Augustine, naturalized as a Spanish citizen, and died an American by the terms of the Adams-Onis Treaty, which ceded the Floridas to the United States. He was the youngest son of an English father, Thomas Clarke Sr., and an Irish mother, Honoria Cummings, who were among the earliest British settlers of British East Florida. His baptismal record in the Cathedral Parish of St. Augustine gives his birth date as October 12, 1774.

Thomas Clarke had obtained by grant or purchase four tracts of land and three houses with their lots in St. Augustine. In 1770, Governor James Grant gave him title to 300 acres on the west side of the Matanzas River, four miles northwest of the Spanish fort at Matanzas Inlet, and about ten miles south of St. Augustine. In honor of his native city he called the plantation he established there Worcester.

After Thomas Clarke Sr. died in 1780, his widow Honoria, a devout Roman Catholic, chose to remain in Florida; she became a Spanish subject following the recession of the province to Spain in 1783, and had her children baptized in the Roman Catholic church. Young George was well-trained in business, his mother having apprenticed him at age twelve to the British trading firm of Panton, Leslie & Company, which dealt with the Indians of Florida and those in the neighboring Spanish-claimed territory.

== Plantation on the Matanzas River ==
Prior to 1802, George, now called "Jorge", helped to manage his mother's property. By that year, he was living in St. Augustine and served as an ensign in the urban militia. In 1804, he purchased from the Crown a town lot and buildings conveniently located on Marine Street, between the military barracks and the old powder magazine. He and his brother Charles then occupied the family land on the south side of the mouth of Moses Creek, alongside the Matanzas River, harvesting and sawing timber trees, as well as gathering oyster shells for their lime kilns. They transported the wood and lime in flatboats sent up the Matanzas River to town, supplying the government with shingles for public buildings, and providing whitewash for the exteriors of houses.

The brothers raised corn, peas, sweet potatoes, pumpkins, and other vegetables, each on his own acreage of the plantation. They lived there for a few years, but as their mercantile and timber interests expanded, with new opportunities for great profits to be made at the free port of Fernandina, they moved their families and slaves in 1808 to the booming community at the north end of Amelia Island. Four freemen were hired to work their acreage on the Matanzas in their absence. "Don Jorge Clarke", his mixed-race common-law wife Flora Leslie and four children 7 to 15 years old are mentioned in an entry of the census taken at Fernandina in 1814.

== His biracial family ==
George J. F. Clarke owned ten adult working enslaved African Americans. Four were women, one of whom tended to his household, and the other three were hired out as laundresses or house servants. The six men labored mostly in his timber business alongside rented slaves and wage-earning freemen. Clarke was among the province's leading citizens who maintained a mixed-race family. He lived as husband and wife with Flora Leslie, a former slave whom he had freed, and made their eight children his heirs, dividing his property among them in his will. He had four children by another black woman named Anna or Hannah Benet after Flora died; they and she were left a legacy of 1,500 acres.

== Service to the Spanish province of East Florida ==
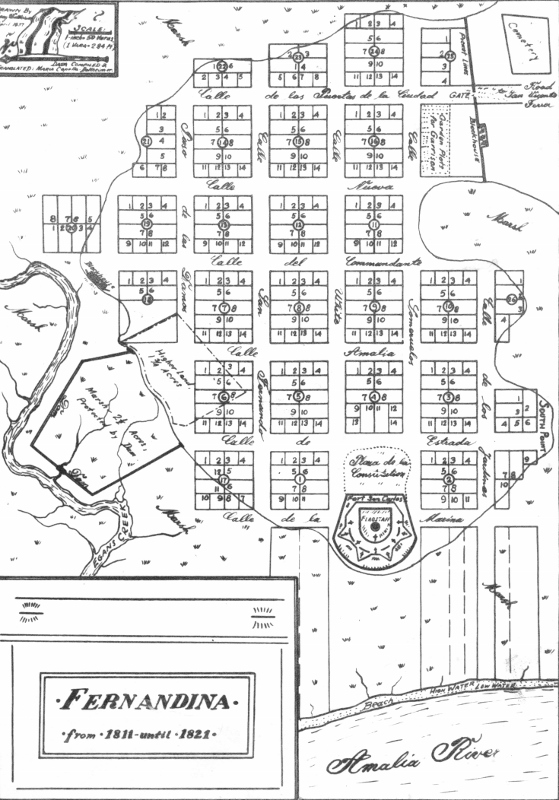
Plat of Fernandina 1811–1821 showing Fort San Carlos

Clarke's first known public service outside the militia was as acting public surveyor in the absence of Juan Purcell. It is likely he had previously served as deputy surveyor; Purcell's absence was prolonged, and after three years, on May 8, 1811, acting Governor Estrada appointed Clarke Surveyor General of East Florida. There was little supervision from Spain, which was embroiled in the Napoleonic invasion, with its government in exile. Clarke was in complete control of the surveying of land grants in the province, and surveyed many land grants for free blacks and helped them document and retain these grants when the United States finally took over Florida in 1821. After the East Florida revolution of 1812, Fernandina was occupied by US troops and the Spanish citizenry fled; some, including Clarke, suffered damage to their homes and businesses in their absence.

The United States Congress passed the Embargo Act of 1807, and prohibited the importation of slaves in 1808. That same year Fernandina was declared a free port; it began to ship great quantities of Florida cotton and lumber, and became a resort for the smuggling business and contraband slave trade. The town entered a boom period of extraordinary growth, with finer residences and crude shacks springing up next to each other. Vegetable gardens were planted haphazardly about, and the streets were little more than crooked paths. The unsightly and unsanitary condition of Fernandina disturbed Governor White, and on May 10, 1811, two days after Clarke's appointment as surveyor general, he instructed him to plat the town so that the streets were properly aligned and the lots were uniform.

In the Patriot War of 1812 George J. F. Clarke and his brother Charles were among those who most actively opposed the American invaders and their raiding parties into the province. George was in command of one of the two Spanish entrenchments at Fernandina when on March 14 his brother Charles brought word that the rebels had gathered at Low's Plantation on Bell's River to raid Fernandina.

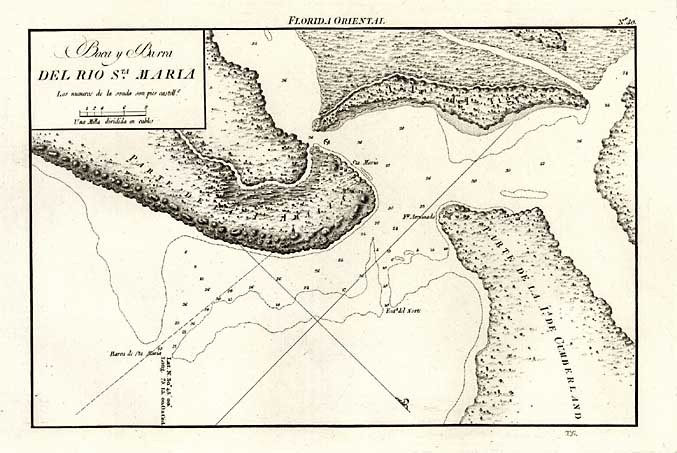
Map showing harbor of Amelia River and bar of the St. Marys River, 1809

On March 16, eight American gunboats under the command of Commodore Hugh Campbell formed a line in the harbor and aimed their guns at the town. Clarke and George Atkinson were sent by Justo Lopez, Commandant of Fort San Carlos and Amelia Island, to meet Commodore Campbell on one of the gunboats anchored in the Amelia River and find out his intentions, but Campbell, uneasy about the turn of events, equivocated. General George Mathews, ensconced at Point Peter on the St. Marys in Georgia, ordered Colonel Lodowick Ashley to send a flag to Lopez, commandant of the fort and Amelia Island, and demand his surrender. Lopez acknowledged the superior force and ordered Clarke to go to John H. McIntosh and Col. Lodowick, "director" and military chief, respectively, of the putative "Republic of Florida", with a flag of surrender, thus turning over the port and the town to the Patriot forces. Along with Justo Lopez, George Atkinson, and Charles W. Clarke, George signed the articles of capitulation on March 17. American forces held Amelia Island "in trust for Spain" until the following spring, and shut off Fernandina harbor to foreign vessels in an attempt to throttle the port's infamous smuggling.

Clarke's main business occupation following the Patriot War was buying and selling lots in Fernandina and lands in other parts of the province. He usually bought the land outright or secured it by grant, and then sought buyers. Sometimes he acted as agent, as he did in the sale of Fort George island in 1816 by John H. McIntosh to Zephaniah Kingsley.

Clarke's last service for the Spanish Crown was as Deputy Governor of East Florida. The colonial administration in Florida had been unstable since the retrocession, due partly to events in Europe—the Napoleonic invasion of the Iberian peninsula, and the revolutionary convulsions in Spain following the restoration of the Bourbons to the Spanish throne. The Spanish treasury was exhausted and the government demoralized. Conditions in the Floridas were unsettled as well with frequent Indian uprisings, the Patriot War, and finally the MacGregor invasion and Louis Aury's occupation. Spanish Florida's main concern, however, was the resolve of the United States to annex it.

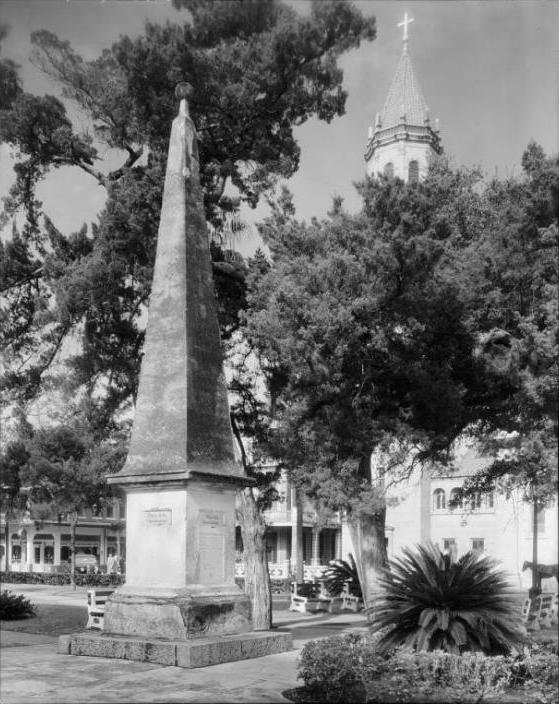
Constitution of 1812 monument in St. Augustine

The withdrawal of US troops in May 1813, and the dispensation by Governor Kindelán of local self-government under the new Spanish Constitution of 1812 to the inhabitants of the turbulent districts along the St. Johns and St. Marys rivers and Amelia Island, had little effect on the state of anarchy now endemic to the area, especially around the St. Marys River where the so-called Patriots were determined to preserve the "Republic of Florida". Civil disturbances were prevalent, and the rebellion begun in 1812 persisted, with hostility directed at the Spanish authorities on Amelia Island. In 1816, Governor Coppinger sent Clarke, Zephaniah Kingsley, and Henry Yonge Jr. to parley with the malcontents and negotiate an agreement by which the hostility might cease.

The three commissioners met forty "people of the main" at Mill's ferry on the St. Marys and arranged for a general meeting of the men of the region to be convened at Waterman's Bluff in three weeks. Clarke and the other two commissioners went to the meeting and offered a "plan of reconciliation and re-establishment of order", proposing that the malcontents accept Spanish rule under a plan that divided the territory between the St. Marys and St. Johns into three self-governing districts, to be known as Upper St. Marys, Lower St. Marys, and Nassau (Amelia Island). Each district was to have a magistrate's court and its own militia, the officers to be elected by the people. The group accepted these conditions, and Clarke's plan was adopted.

Governor Coppinger approved these proceedings and offered Clarke an appointment to superintend jurisdiction of the division, which he accepted on condition that it be confined to Upper and Lower St. Marys, omitting Amelia Island. Clarke was accordingly commissioned Capitan del partido Septentrional de la Florida del Esta (Captain of the Northern District of East Florida). His obituary notice described him as "Lieutenant Governor of East Florida". He later wrote that in the five years of his tenure in this office there had been only one appeal and one complaint to the authorities in St. Augustine, but admitted that his administration was assisted by "Lynch's Law" implemented by the more respectable citizens.

As Capitan of the "Northern Division" and Lieutenant of the Urban Militia of East Florida, Clarke was of great service to the province during the MacGregor and Aury interlude, and was the prime mover in keeping his section loyal to the Spanish Crown. The three companies of militia called by the governor to defend Amelia Island, consisting of mostly black citizens, were led by Clarke himself.

The Spanish regular officer leading the expedition ordered a retreat, to the disgust of Clarke's men, who returned to their homes. Even so, Clarke worked to impede the advance of the invaders into the province and tried to prevent the passage to and from Fernandina of enslaved African Americans and other contraband cargo.

Under orders of Governor Coppinger, Clarke reconnoitered Fernandina in August and September 1817, reporting on the status of the enemy's personnel, vulnerabilities of the fortifications, the number and kind of vessels in the harbor, rumors of expected reinforcements, and their intention to seize slaves from neighboring plantations to repair the fort. Clarke assured the governor that the militia was ready to fight.

In his report of September 1, Clarke related the departure of MacGregor and submitted a plan for the disposition of Spanish troops to attack the enemy forces still remaining in Fernandina. After MacGregor's departure, the freebooter Louis Aury assumed control of the island and declared the Floridas a part of the Republic of Mexico. On December 23 the United States government, which had been surveilling the situation, moved in and Aury surrendered. The stars and stripes were raised over Fort San Carlos, the fifth flag in five years to wave over Fernandina. United States troops remained on Amelia Island until November 30, 1819; meanwhile negotiations for the treaty of cession were concluded between the United States and Spain.

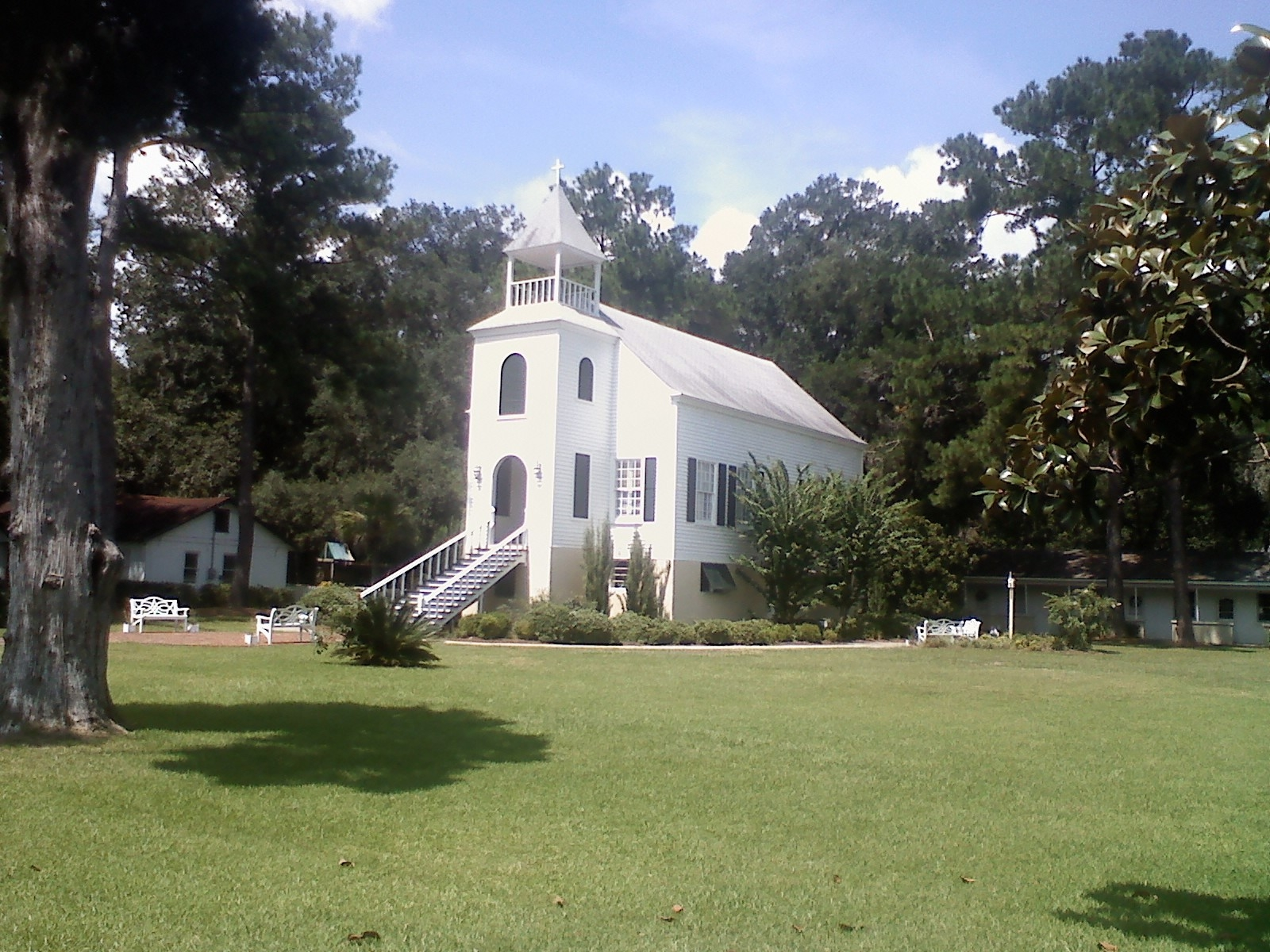
First Presbyterian Church, St. Marys (1808)

Clarke lived in Fernandina from 1808 until MacGregor seized the town in 1817. He then moved to St. Marys, Georgia, and rented "a house of occasional residence". One of his accomplishments was to establish regular mail service from that town through East Florida. Soon afterwards, he obtained an appointment as Spanish vice consul to the Carolinas and Georgia, a position he held until the change of flags.

When the United States took possession of the Floridas in 1821 – and surely could have used men of Clarke's experience and stature to ease the transition from Spanish to American rule – his services were not called upon. From 1823 to 1825, he was, however, frequently required to appear as a witness before the Board of Commissioners for East Florida, appointed to examine and pass judgement on the land claims of former Spanish subjects. The three commissioners appointed for East Florida were Davis Floyd, William F. Blair, and Alexander Hamilton Jr. Hamilton remarked on what he considered "Clarke's extravagant pretensions and inconsistent representations". The commissioners were skeptical of Clarke's often haphazard and incomplete surveys, and usually rejected claims which had no other supporting evidence of their validity.

== Retirement to St. Augustine ==
Clarke was living in St. Marys, Georgia, when the Floridas were transferred to the United States, but returned to St. Augustine before the spring of 1823. With the change of flags, Clarke's public service virtually came to an end. He spent the rest of his life in that city, devoting himself to maintaining his properties, experimenting in agriculture and fruit growing, writing articles for the East Florida Herald newspaper, and trying to collect damages from the US government for the loss of various properties during the Patriot War.

Local planter Gen. Joseph M. Hernández made mention of Clarke's horticultural activities in an address to the Agricultural Society of St. Augustine (transcribed in the East Florida Herald and reproduced in the Pensacola Gazette of June 25, 1825): "Many valuable plants have been introduced from the northern states by George J. F. Clarke of St. Augustine and by Col. Murat, both of whom are attentively engaged in experiments that are likely to prove of great consequence to the Territory."

Clarke wrote a series of articles for the St. Augustine newspaper and its successor, the East Florida Herald, which appeared regularly from 1823 to 1832, describing the results of his horticultural observations and experiments. He discussed the proper use of fertilizers, the cultivation of fruits, vegetables, and tobacco, beekeeping, the utilization of wild plants, and the necessity for growing diversified crops. He advocated self-sufficient farming and insisted that sweet oranges should be grown in preference to sour oranges, and that waste lands could be made profitable by planting them with fruit trees. In a letter dated August 10, 1830, he described the careful picking and handling of the oranges grown by Jesse Fish at his El Vergel plantation on Anastasia island and shipped safely to London, where they had found favor for their sweetness. He believed strongly that the people of Florida should grow more vegetables and thought growing maguey for liquor-distillation would be profitable.

He wrote a long article on the growing and curing of tobacco for cigar-making and discussed how the bulbous roots of "comtee" (coontie), which grows wild in Florida and Georgia, could be used to make a starchy flour called Florida arrowroot, thus anticipating a future commercial enterprise in Florida.

== Death and unknown whereabouts of his grave ==
About four years before he died, Clarke published his observations on education. After his death the East Florida Herald published in seven parts Clarke's letter to Rev. Jedidiah Morse, D. D., corresponding secretary of the American Civilization Society. The letter was written at St. Marys, July 1, 1822, and treated of the Florida Indians—their ethnic characteristics, social customs, language, personal appearance, medicinal use of native plants, spiritual beliefs, burial methods, practice of slavery, treatment of enemies, and of the chief Secoffee (Cowkeeper) and his son King Payne. Clarke alleged that he got much of his information from an Indian woman named 'Mary' whose tribal name supposedly meant "Salt Water Indians", and who died in 1802 at the age of 100.

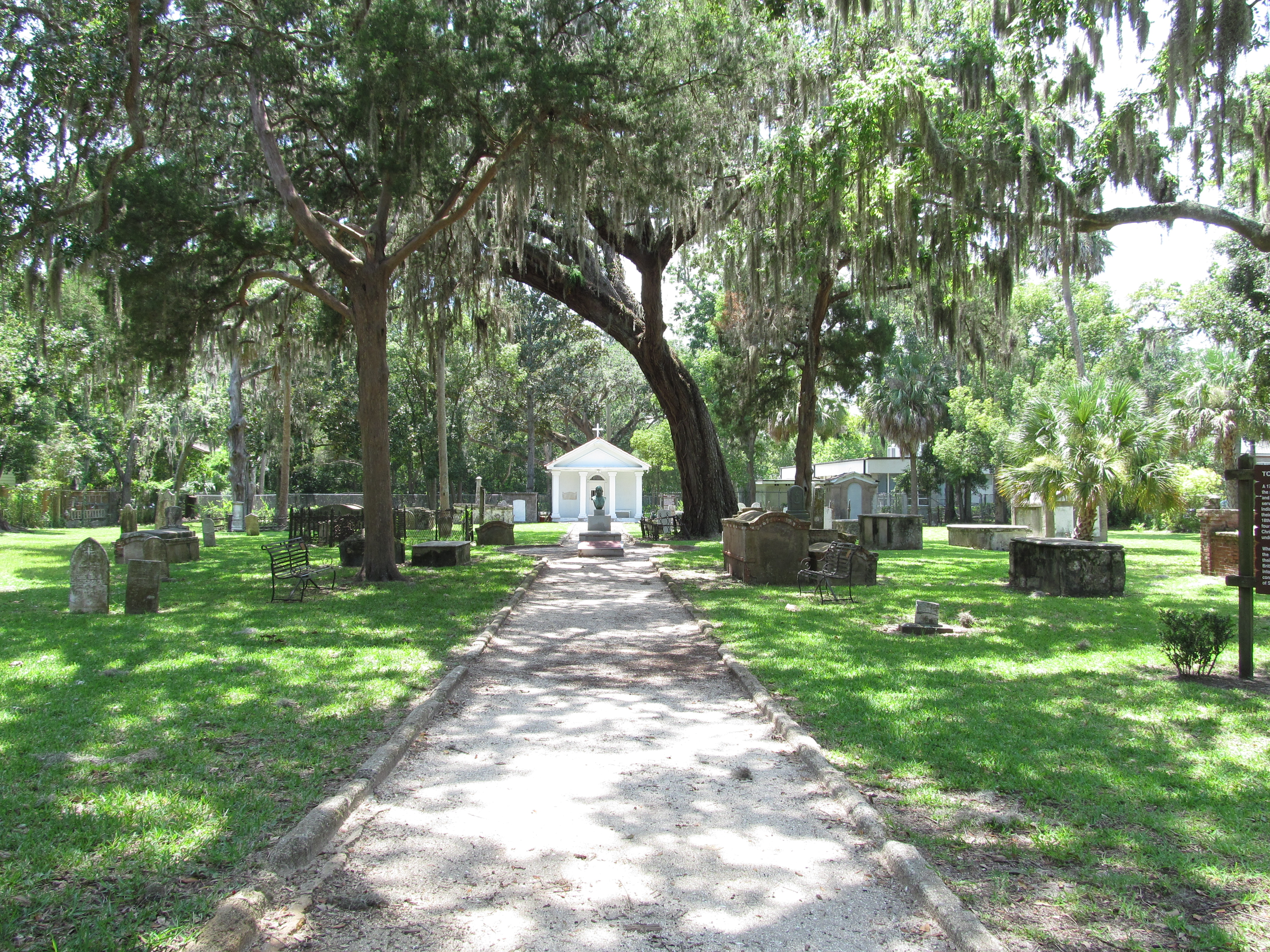
Tolomato Cemetery entryway

The date of Clarke's death is uncertain, and the place of his burial is unknown. In the section "American Obituraries for 1836" in the American Almanac for 1838, the following entry appears:

Oct. 20, at St. Augustine, Florida, George I. F. Clark, a native of Florida, and for many years Lieutenant-Governor and Surveyor-General of the province of East Florida, under the Spanish Government.

In a bill of complaint filed in chancery court, July 25, 1840, it is stated that:

... on or about the twenty-third day of October Anno Domini Eighteen Hundred and Thirty Six at the City of St. Augustine the said George J. F. Clarke departed this life ...

The burial records of the Cathedral archives for 1831–1844 are missing, but according to Louise Biles Hill, the date October 20, 1836, is most likely the correct one. Clarke was probably buried in St. Augustine in the Tolomato Catholic cemetery, on what is now Cordova street, although no vaults or headstones bearing his name have been found. There is no record of his interment in the Bosque Bello cemetery of Old Town Fernandina.
