= Solicito Salvador =

Solicito "Mike" Salvador, originally Salvadore Sollecito (1869–1924), was a leader and innovator in the Florida shrimping industry in Fernandina Beach, Florida. He is listed as a Great Floridian.

Born in 1869, Sollecito Salvatore came from Syracuse, Sicily, as a merchant seaman aboard an Italian freighter forced by a hurricane to lay over at the Port of Fernandina in Fernandina, Florida.

Salvador came to New Orleans in 1895 on a banana boat. He traveled to Cedar Key and then Fernandina in 1898 by train. He first worked as an interpreter, fishing part-time. Then he got into shrimping. He experimented with preservatives so shrimp could be shipped and tried canning. He used large shrimp shipments to secure refrigerated car lots and used haul seines to increase catch size. As others copied his innovations, the local industry expanded and corollary businesses such as boat building prospered. He used modified otter trawl nets to greatly expand the catch and make use of deeper waters. He and his brother-in-law, Salvatore Versaggi, expanded operations to St. Augustine, Florida. Salvador founded the Salvador Fish Company in 1906 and by 1921 was shipping across the U.S. and internationally to countries including Canada and Denmark. He died in 1924.

A blue plaque commemorating Salvador is located at the site of his family residence at 20 South 4th Street in Fernandina Beach.
