= Fort San Carlos =

Military outpost in Spanish Florida

Coordinates: 30.68868°N 81.45687°W

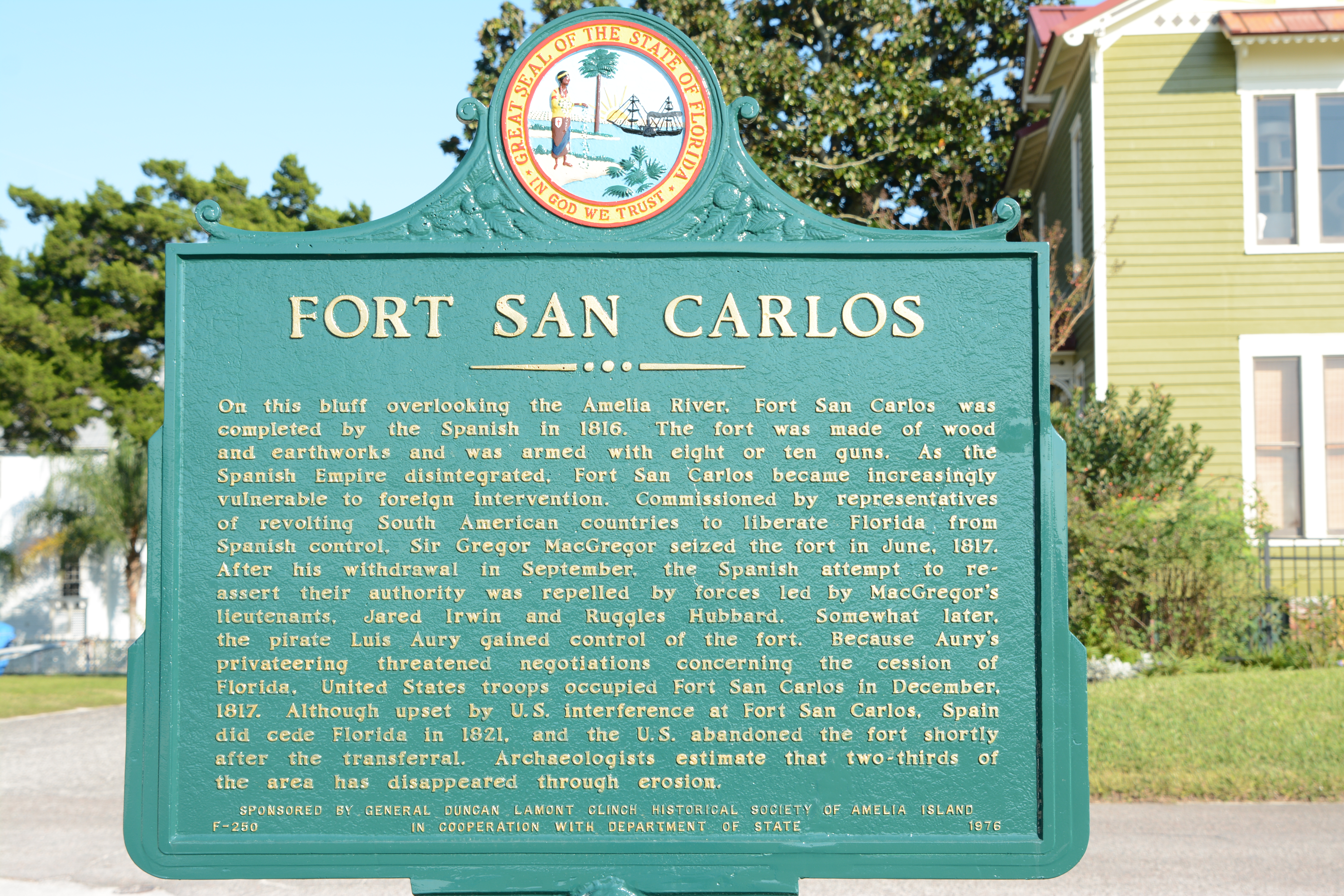
Historical marker

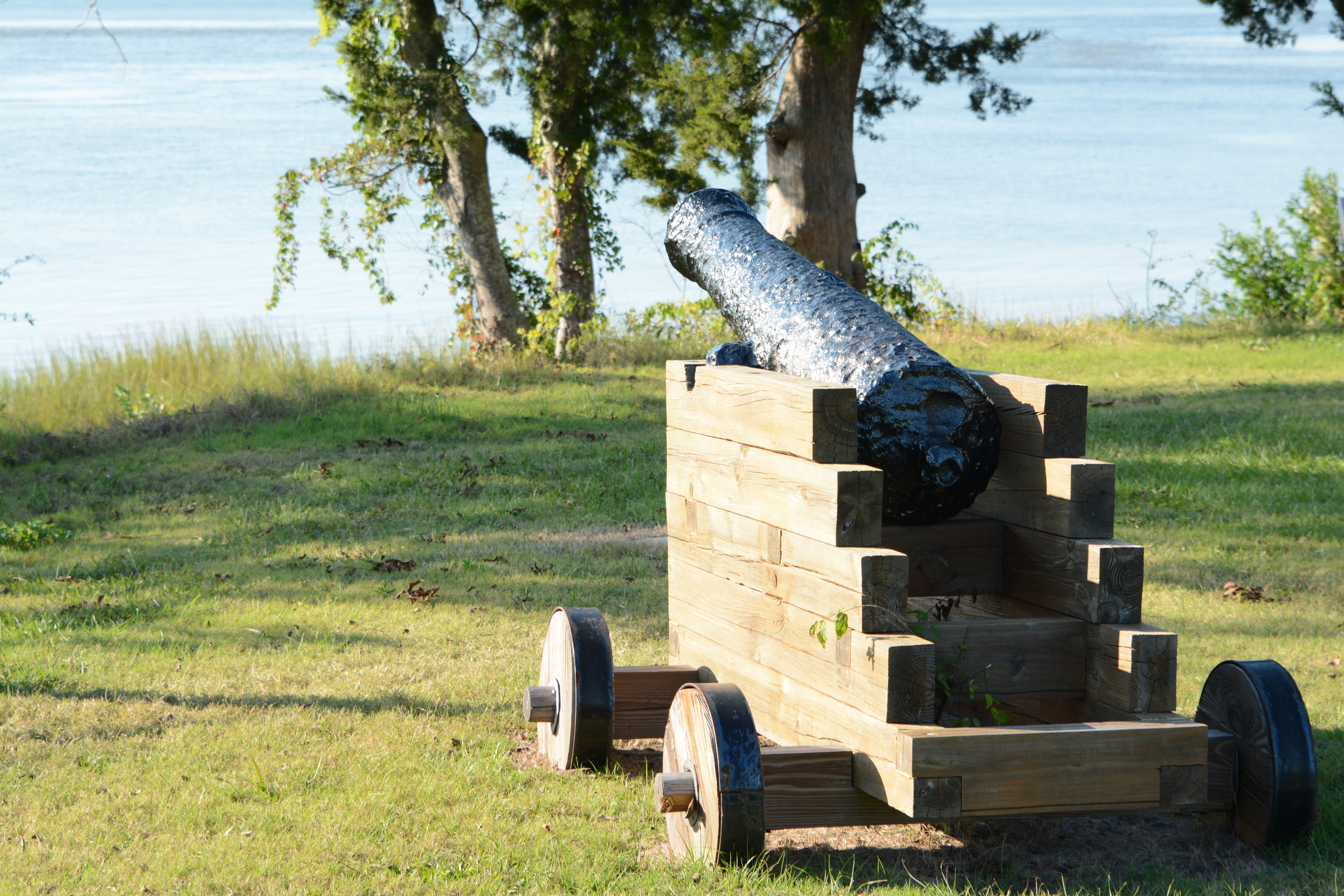
Cannon on the site of the fort

Fort San Carlos was a military structure built in 1816 to defend the Spanish colonial town of Fernandina, Florida, now called Old Town, which occupied a peninsula on the northern end of Amelia Island. The fort, a lunette fortification, stood on the southwest side of the town next to the harbor, on a bluff overlooking the Amelia River. It was made of wood and earthworks, backed with a wooden palisade on the east side, and armed with an eight or ten gun battery. Two blockhouses protected access by land on the south, while the village was surrounded with military pickets. An 1821 map of Fernandina shows that the street plan, laid out in 1811 in a grid pattern by the newly appointed Surveyor General of Spanish East Florida, George J. F. Clarke, today preserves nearly the same layout as that of 1821. The fort occupied the area bounded by the streets Calle de Estrada, Calle de White, and Calle de Someruelos. The structure itself has disappeared and only traces remain in what is now Fernandina Plaza Historic State Park.

The park contains the largest known undeveloped portion of the site of Spanish municipal and military activity on Amelia Island dating from the late 1780s. Archaeological investigations, starting in the early 1950s, revealed intermittent occupation and use of the area for as long as 4,000 years, beginning in the Orange period (2000–500 BC) and continuing to this day. A Spanish sentinel house was built in 1696 at the Timuqua village located there. Nearly all of Old Town was built on this Indian village and its shell heaps. In later colonial times the site gained military importance because of its deep harbor and its strategic location near the northern boundary of Spanish Florida.

== History ==
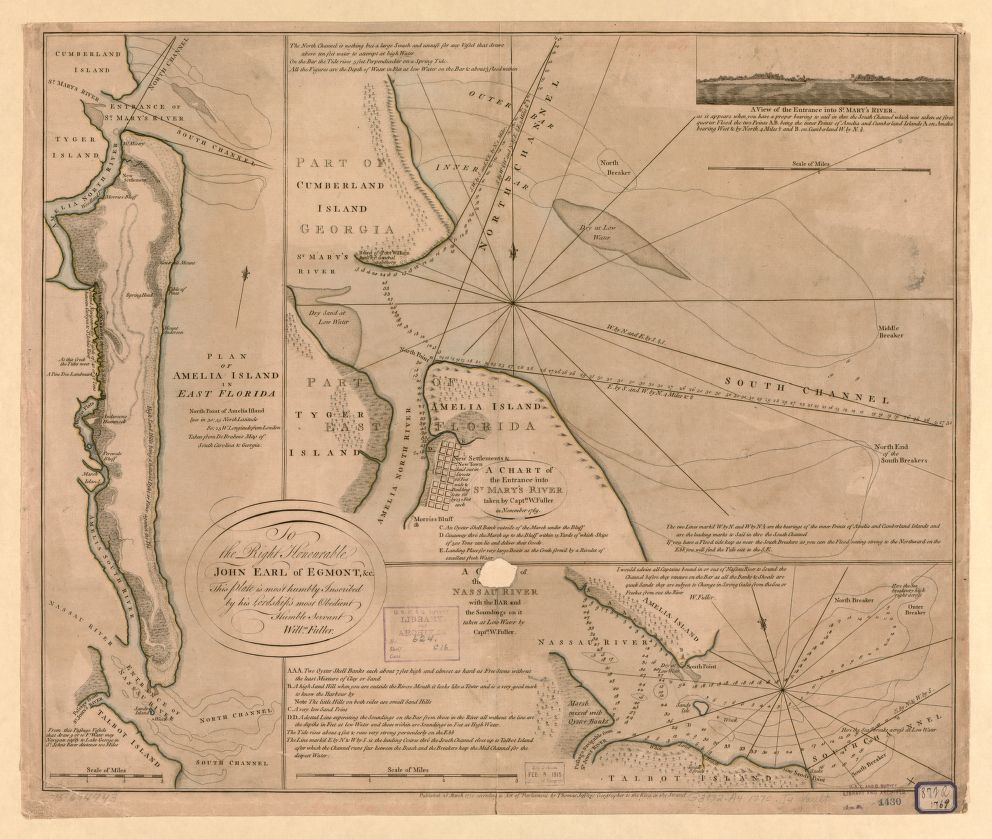
Plan of Amelia Island. 1770 (1777)

The history of Fort San Carlos is intimately connected with the development of the Fernandina Plaza, also called the Town Lot, first defined in 1769 when a town site which included the lot was shown in charts drawn by Capt. John Fuller and then mapped by cartographer Thomas Jefferys in 1770. As late as 1777, however, there were no indications of any town development. The place had stood uninhabited, except for occasional encampments of English colonial invaders, since the raids in 1702 by Colonel James Moore, governor of Carolina.

Prior to the British evacuation of East Florida when it was returned to Spanish rule, Maria Mattair, née Green (1755–1820), the widow of Lewis Mattair (1751–1783), had received a grant from Governor Tonyn for 200 acres along this bluff overlooking the Amelia River. Amelia Island was virtually depopulated after raids by American patriots in the mid-1770s. Mary Mattair and her family were the only occupants known to remain on the island following the evacuation.

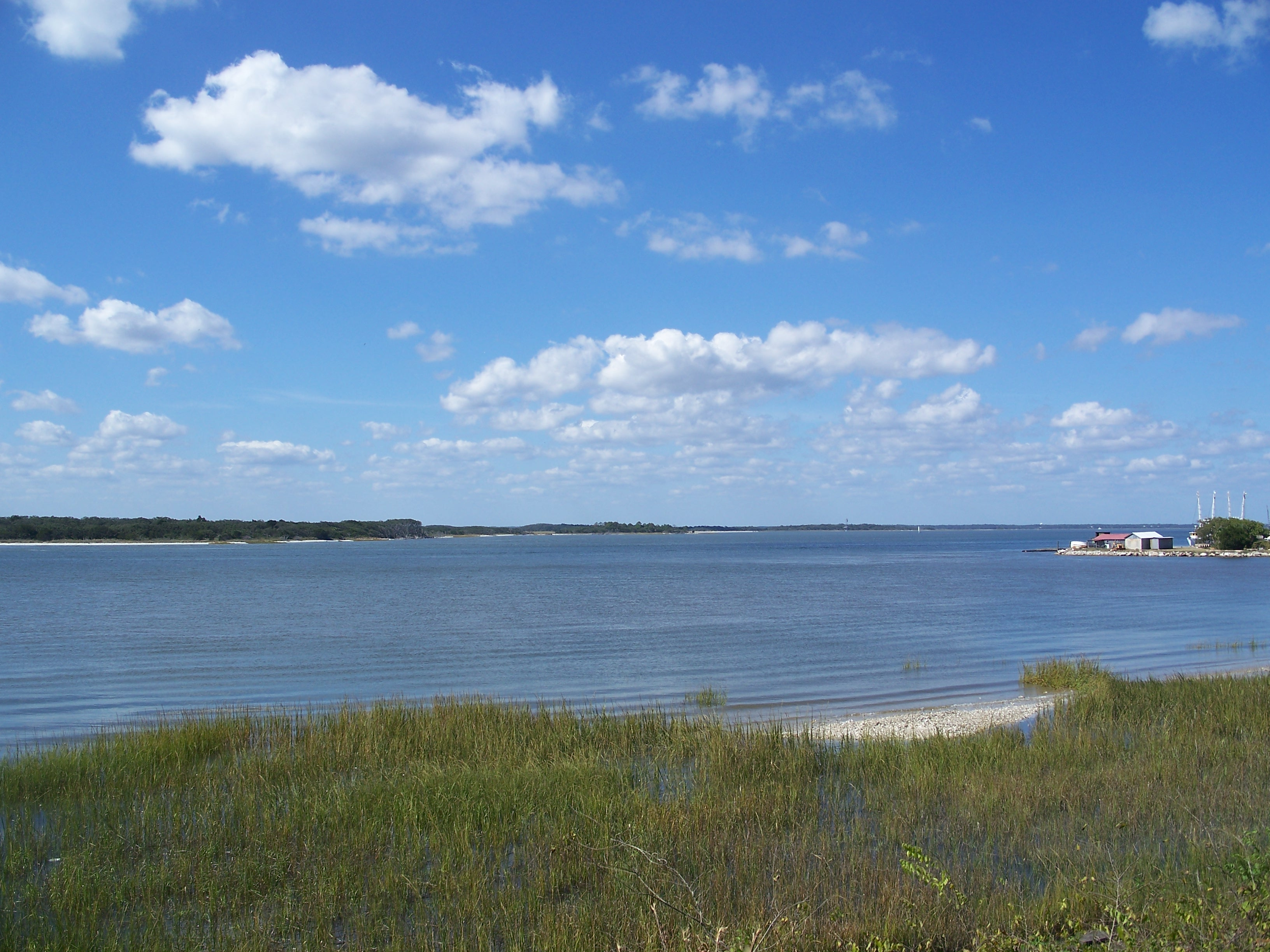
Amelia River, viewed from Old Town site

Maria Mattair owned the Town Lot and surroundings from 1784 until 1788, when the Spanish colonial government assumed possession after a land exchange. In June 1795, American rebel marauders led by Richard Lang attacked the Spanish garrison on Amelia Island. Colonel Charles Howard, an officer in the Spanish military, discovered that the rebels had built a battery and were flying the French flag. On August 2, he raised a sizable Spanish force, sailed up Sisters Creek and the Nassau River, and attacked them. The rebels fled across the St. Marys River to Georgia.

The town lot or plaza was an essential element of the Spanish colonial town plan. Government offices were designed to face the plaza, and in the case of this coastal village, the plaza could be fortified as a defensive work. An army encampment was recorded in the Plaza Lot in 1801, and a small wooden fort, including a battery of three cannon, was established from then until 1814. The more substantial Fort San Carlos was built about 1816 to protect the strategic harbor of the Amelia River and Spanish interests in northern Florida. The former Indian campsite became the fort’s parade grounds fronting Estrada Street, which still exists.

=== Fernandina Township platted according to the Laws of the Indies ===
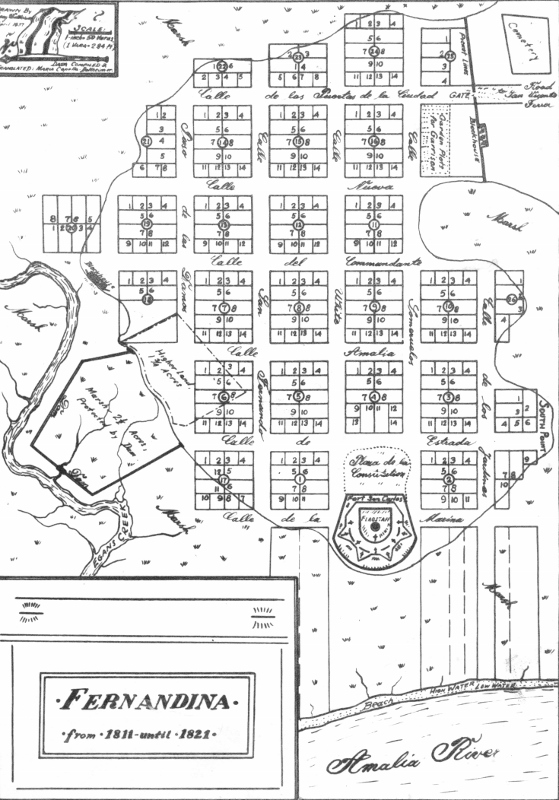
Plat of Fernandina from 1811 until 1821, showing location of Fort San Carlos, drawn by Franz Dollheimer in April 1937

On May 10, 1811, the acting Spanish governor at the time, Juan José Estrada, instructed the newly appointed public surveyor, George J. F. Clarke, to plat the township in accordance with the 1542 Spanish Laws of the Indies (Leyes de Indias). These laws regulated how the site for a Spanish settlement should be selected, and how the town should be laid out in classical grid form. Places were designated for the fort and its parade ground.

The town stood on the high ground behind the imposing bluff facing the Amelia River. This location was on a wide peninsula with a relatively narrow isthmus at the southeast, the road to the rest of Amelia Island entering the town through the gates at that point. Egan's Creek and saltmarsh bounded the north and east sides, while another marsh stretched south of the town. From marsh to marsh across the neck of dry land there was a strong picket with a small blockhouse mounting two 4-pounder cannons that guarded the entrance. Another blockhouse flanking the town mounted one 4-pounder. Fort San Carlos commanded the anchorage of the Amelia River to the west as far as the channel of the St. Marys River; it mounted four long Spanish 16-pounders, five 4-pounders, and one 6-pound carronade.

=== The Patriots' War ===
Because it was a center for smuggling and represented a threat to trade of the United States, Fernandina was invaded and seized by forces under the command of General George Mathews in 1812 with the approval of President James Madison. A group of Americans calling themselves the "Patriots of Amelia Island" had banded together to drive out the Spanish and reported to General Mathews, who moved into a house at St. Marys, Georgia, nine miles across Cumberland Sound.

East Florida Patriot Flag

On March 16, nine American gunboats under the command of Commodore Hugh Campbell formed a line in the harbor and aimed their guns at the town. General Mathews, who was ensconced at Point Peter on the St. Marys River in Georgia, ordered Colonel Lodowick Ashley to send a flag to Don Justo Lopez, commandant of the fort and Amelia Island, and demand his surrender. Lopez acknowledged the superior force and surrendered the Port of Fernandina and the town. John H. McIntosh, George J. F. Clarke, Justo Lopez, and others signed the articles of capitulation; the Patriots then raised their own standard at the flagstaff of the fort. The next day, March 17, a detachment of 250 regular United States troops were brought over from Point Peter, and the newly constituted Patriot government surrendered the town to General Matthews, who ordered the stars and stripes of the US flag raised immediately.

General Mathews and President Madison had conceived a plan to annex East Florida to the United States, but Congress became alarmed at the possibility of being drawn into war with Spain, and the effort fell apart when Secretary of State James Monroe was forced to relieve Matthews of his commission. Negotiations for the withdrawal of US troops began early in 1813. On May 6, the US army lowered the flag at Fernandina and crossed the St. Marys River to Georgia with the remaining troops. Spain took possession of the redoubt and regained control of the island. The Spanish completed construction of the new Fort San Carlos to guard the port side of Fernandina in 1816.

=== Gregor MacGregor and the Republic of the Floridas ===
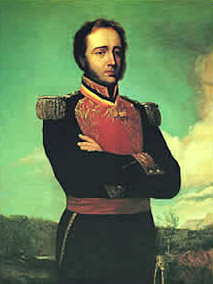
General Gregor MacGregor

As the Spanish Empire disintegrated, Fernandina became increasingly vulnerable to foreign depredations. The small garrison at Fernandina had only fifty-four men on duty including officers, most of them old veterans, some of whom had served in the Spanish colonial armies for thirty years. The town had less than two hundred residents, no more than fifty of them able to bear arms in the militia. Amelia Island's economy was primarily based on smuggling, and Fernandina was booming with the importation of enslaved Africans to circumvent the United States' ban on importing slaves.

A Scottish military adventurer and mercenary, General Gregor MacGregor, claimed to be commissioned by representatives of the revolting Venezuela and New Granada to liberate Florida from Spanish rule. Financed by American backers, he led an army of only 150 men including recruits from Charleston and Savannah, some War of 1812 veterans, and 55 musketeers in an assault on Fort San Carlos. Through spies within the Spanish garrison, MacGregor had learned that the force there consisted of only 54 regulars and 50 militia men. He spread rumors in the town which eventually reached the garrison commander that an army of more than 1,000 men was about to attack. MacGregor and his men assaulted Fort San Carlos on June 29, 1817, advancing on the fort from the north, and deployed in small groups coming from various directions across Egans Creek to give the impression of a larger force. The commander, Francisco Morales, struck the Spanish flag and fled. MacGregor raised his flag, the "Green Cross of Florida", a green cross on a white ground, over the fort and proclaimed the "Republic of the Floridas".

Green Cross Flag of Republic of the Floridas

Now in possession of the town, and seeing the need to make the appearance of a legitimate government, he appointed Ruggles Hubbard, the former high sheriff of New York City, as unofficial civil governor, and Jared Irwin, an adventurer and former Pennsylvania Congressman, as his treasurer. Expecting reinforcements for a raid against the Castillo de San Marcos in St. Augustine, MacGregor intended to subdue all of Spanish East Florida. His plan was doomed to fail, however, as President James Monroe was in sensitive negotiations with Spain to acquire all of Florida.

Soon MacGregor's reserves were depleted, and the Republic needed revenue. He commissioned privateers to seize Spanish ships, and they began selling captured prizes and their cargoes, which often included slaves. About August 28, fellow conspirator Ruggles Hubbard sailed into the harbor aboard his own brig Morgiana, flying the flag of Buenos Aires, but without the needed men, guns, and money. MacGregor then announced his departure for New Providence in the Bahamas. On September 4, faced with the threat of a Spanish reprisal, and still lacking money and adequate reinforcements, he abandoned his plans to conquer Florida and departed Fernandina with most of his officers, leaving a small detachment of men at Fort San Carlos to defend the island. After his withdrawal, these and a force of American irregulars organized by Hubbard and Irwin repelled the Spanish attempt to reassert authority.

=== The Battle of Amelia Island ===
On September 13 the Battle of Amelia Island commenced when the Spaniards erected a battery of four brass cannons on McLure’s Hill east of Fort San Carlos. With about 300 men, supported by two gunboats, they shelled Fernandina being held by Jared Irwin. His "Republic of Florida" forces included ninety-four men, the privateer ships Morgiana and St. Joseph, and the armed schooner Jupiter. Spanish gunboats began firing at 3:30 pm and the battery on the hill joined the cannonade. The guns of Fort San Carlos, on the river bluff northwest of the hill, and those of the St. Joseph defended Amelia Island. Cannonballs killed two and wounded other Spanish troops clustered below. Firing continued until dark. The Spanish commander, convinced he could not capture the island, withdrew his forces.

=== The French Corsair Luis Aury ===
Mexican insurgents' flag flown by privateer Louis Aury

On September 17, the French privateer Luis Aury, a previous acquaintance of MacGregor's who had served with him in Simon Bolívar's army in Venezuela and New Granada, sailed into the Port of Fernandina aboard his flagship, Mexican Congress, accompanied by two other privateering ships and holding prizes valued at $60,000. His ship mounted 12 long 18-pounders and had a crew of 300 American recruits and Haitian ex-slaves, free blacks, and mulattoes known as "Aury's blacks". Aury marched to Hubbard’s quarters with a body of armed men and demanded concessions from Hubbard and Irwin, who were short of troops and funds. They appealed for financial aid, but Aury refused, unless he have supreme command of both civil and military government. When Hubbard and Irwin protested his terms, Aury threatened to leave the island. Realizing they had nothing to gain by opposing him, a compromise was reached and they made an alliance with the Frenchman: Aury would be commander-in-chief of military and naval forces, Irwin his adjutant general, and Hubbard the civil governor of Amelia. The flag of the revolutionary Republic of Mexico was raised over Fort San Carlos on September 21, 1817, and thus Amelia Island was dubiously annexed to the Republic of Mexico. Aury created an administrative body called the "Supreme Council of the Floridas", directed his secretaries Pedro Gual Escandón and Vicente Pazos Kanki to draw up a constitution, and invited all Florida people to unite in throwing off the Spanish yoke.

=== Adams-Onis Treaty transfers Florida and Fort San Carlos to the United States ===
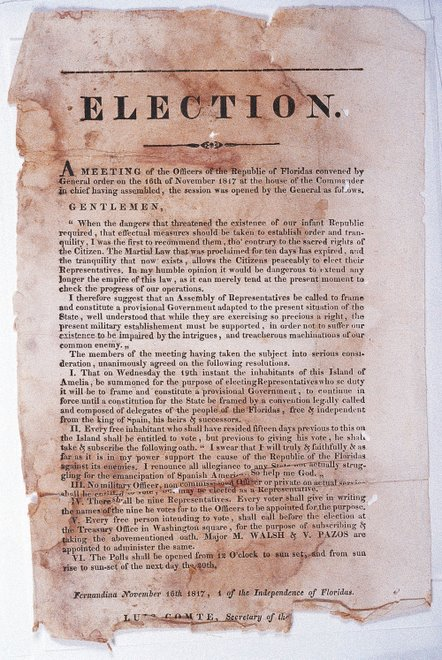
Proclamation for general election of legislature of the Republic of the Floridas

The new government of Fernandina was short-lived. According to Lloyd's of London, Aury's commissioned privateers captured more than $500,000 worth of Spanish goods in two months. They preyed on Spanish vessels carrying slaves, most of whom were smuggled into Georgia after being captured. These activities threatened the negotiations concerning the cession of Florida and in response President Monroe sent forces to retake Amelia on October 31. After a contentious exchange of communications with representatives of the president, Aury realized his position was untenable and surrendered the island and the fort to Commodore J.D. Henley and Major James Bankhead on December 23, 1817. Aury remained over two months as an unwelcome guest; Bankhead occupied Fernandina and held it "in trust" for Spain. Although angered by US interference at Fort San Carlos, Spain did cede Florida in 1821. The proclamation of the Adams-Onis Treaty on February 22, 1821, two years after its signing, officially transferred East Florida and what remained of West Florida to the United States. The US Army made little use of the fort and soon abandoned it.

=== Decline of Old Town and Fort San Carlos ===
Fernandina, the one-time smugglers' den and freebooter haven, subsequently faded into quiet obscurity, although the local militia of the Confederate Army occupied Fort San Carlos during the Civil War (1861–1865), and the US military is known to have used it briefly during the Spanish–American War (1898). Archaeologists estimate that two-thirds of the area formerly occupied by the fort has disappeared through erosion by the Amelia River.

Today, most of the Town Lot is contained within Fernandina Plaza Historic State Park, an unfenced grassy area, marked by a State of Florida Historic Marker. Fernandina Plaza Historic State Park sits at an elevation of approximately three meters above sea level; the terrain is essentially flat. The original topography has undoubtedly changed as a result of human occupation and the construction of Fort San Carlos, but the original Spanish town plan and regular street grid, with many of the Spanish street names, remain. Traces of the earthworks and the former parade grounds can be found along Estrada Street.

In 1950–51, John W. Griffin and Ripley P. Bullen, the archaeologists for the Florida Board of Parks and Historical Memorials, led extensive archaeological excavations in the Fort San Carlos area. The Florida State University Department of Anthropology, under the direction of Hale G. Smith, conducted a field archaeology techniques course at the fort during the spring of 1963.

A report compiled by Smith and Bullen, "Fort San Carlos", synthesizing the results of both excavations, was published by the Department of Anthropology at Florida State University in 1971. The field notes and profile drawings of the 1951 excavations were lost; however, the work in 1963 re-excavated most of the areas covered in 1951 by Griffin and Bullen.

The 1963 field session was held at Fort San Carlos at the request of the Duncan Lamont Clinch Historical Society of Amelia Island. The Historical Society was interested in having archaeological work done on the fort site so that it might be reconstructed in the future.

== See also ==
- Original Town of Fernandina Historic Site
