= Amelia Island affair =

Occupation of island in Spanish Florida in 1817

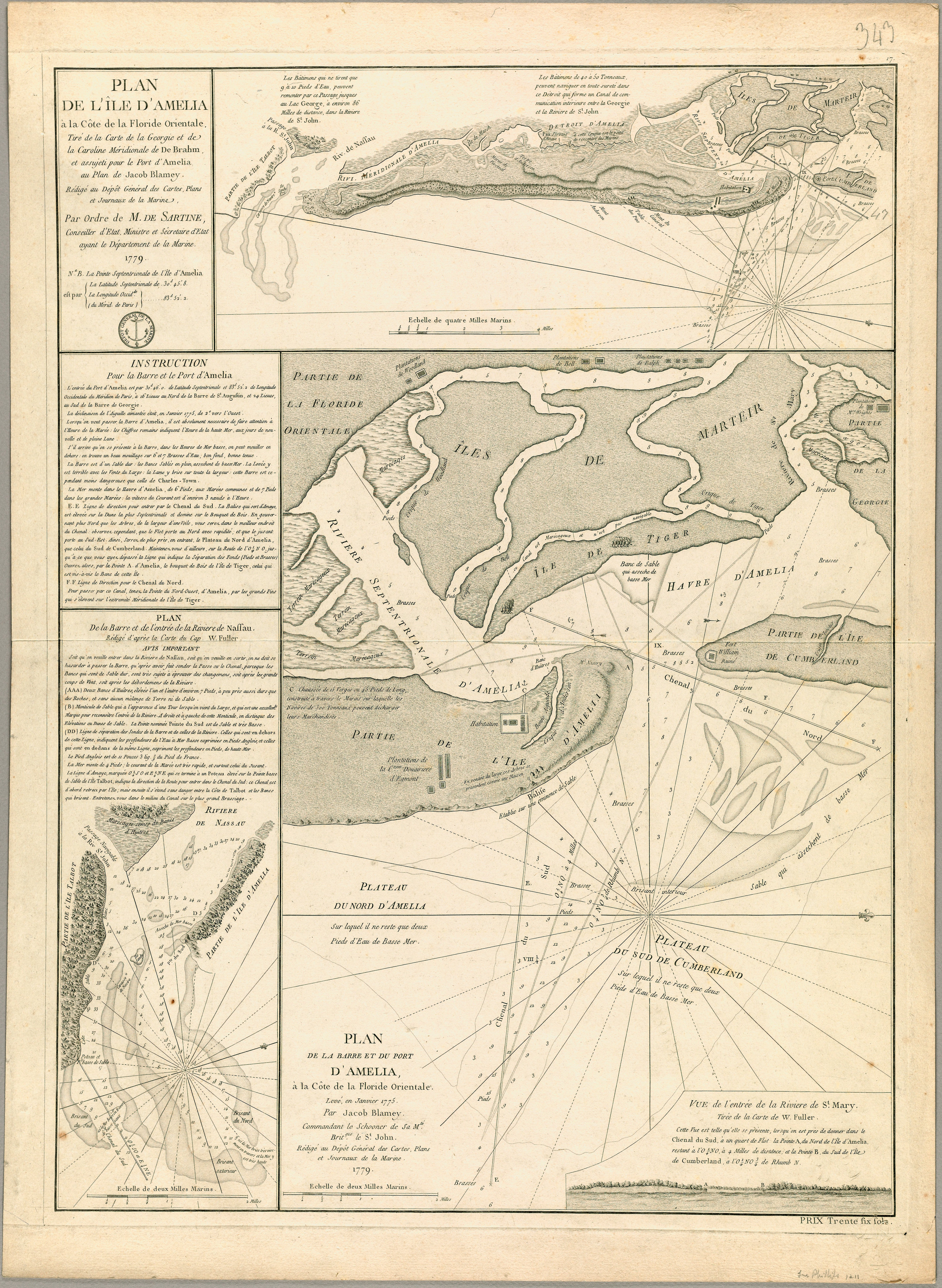
Nautical chart of Amelia Island, 1799

The Amelia Island affair was an episode in the history of Spanish Florida.

The Embargo Act (1807) and the abolition of the American slave trade (1808) made Amelia Island, on the coast of northeastern Florida under Spanish rule, a resort for smugglers with sometimes as many as 150 ships in its harbor. In June, 1817, Gregor MacGregor, a Scottish adventurer styling himself the "Brigadier General of the United Provinces of New Granada and Venezuela, and General-in-Chief of the Armies of the Two Floridas", came to Amelia Island. A peripatetic military adventurer, MacGregor, purportedly commissioned by Simón Bolívar, had raised funds and troops for a full-scale invasion of Florida, but squandered much of the money on luxuries. As word of his conduct in the South American independence wars reached the United States, many of the recruits in his invasion force deserted. Nonetheless, he overran the island with a small force, but left for Nassau in September.

Mexican insurgents' flag flown by privateer Louis Aury

His followers were soon joined by Louis-Michel Aury, formerly associated with MacGregor in South American adventures, and previously one of the leaders of a group of buccaneers on Galveston Island, Texas. After assuming control of Amelia, Aury created an administrative body called the "Supreme Council of the Floridas", while Pedro Gual Escandón and Vicente Pazos Kanki drew up a constitution, and invited all Florida to unite in throwing off the Spanish yoke. For the few months that Aury controlled Amelia Island, the flag of the revolutionary Republic of Mexico was flown. This was the flag of his supposed clients who were still fighting the Spanish in their war for independence at the time. The United States, which had plans to annex the peninsula, sent a naval force which captured Amelia Island on December 23, 1817.

Amelia Island was viewed by the U.S. as a "colony of pirates and slave traders" who were prone to violating the 1808 Prohibition on the Importation of Slaves.In his December 2, 1817, message to the 15th United States Congress, President James Monroe described the affair as "a mere private, unauthorized adventure":

Projected and commenced with an incompetent force, reliance seems to have been placed on what might be drawn, in defiance of our laws, from within our limits; and of late, as their resources have failed, it has assumed a more marked character of unfriendliness to us; the island being made a channel for the illicit introduction of slaves from Africa, into the United States, an asylum for fugitive slaves from the neighboring states, and a port for smuggling of every kind.
