= Louis-Michel Aury =

French pirate (1786–1821)

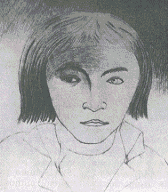
- Born: c. 1787; Paris, Kingdom of France
- Died: August 30, 1821; San Andrés, Gran Colombia
- Occupations: sailor, privateer
- Employer(s): French government, Mexican government, self-employed
- Known for: privateering and filibustering efforts to overturn governments in East Florida, Mexico, Spanish Texas, the Caribbean Sea, Central America, and South America
- Military career
- Allegiance: France
- Branch: French Navy
- Service years: 1802 or 1803–1811

Louis-Michel Aury (1788 – August 30, 1821) was a French privateer operating in the Gulf of Mexico and the Caribbean during the early 19th century.

== Early life ==
Louis Michel-Aury was born in Paris, France in the 1780s, likely between 21 July 1786 and 1788.

== French Navy ==
Aury served in the French Navy from 1802 or 1803 until 1811 as a sailor on a ship stationed in the French colonies of the West Indies. From 1802 he crewed on privateer ships, and by 1810 he had accumulated enough prize money to become the master of his own vessel. He participated in various privateering and filibuster efforts to overturn governments in East Florida, Mexico, Spanish Texas, the Caribbean Sea, Central America, and South America.

Flag of Louis Aury, circa 1816

== Evacuation of Cartagena de Indias ==
Aury decided to support the Spanish colonies of South America in their fight for independence from Spanish rule. In April 1813 he sailed from North Carolina on his own privateer ship with Venezuelan Letters of Marque to attack Spanish ships. He was then commissioned as a commodore in the navy of New Granada (now Colombia), at considerable personal expense, in December 1815 ran the Spanish blockade and evacuated hundreds of people in his vessels from the besieged fortress city of Cartagena de Indias (Colombia) to Haiti. In spite of his success in this dangerous exploit he argued with Simón Bolívar, leader of the Latin American revolutionaries, over payment for his services in organizing the unsuccessful naval expedition to Los Cayos.

== Governor of Galveston ==
Aury subsequently accepted an appointment as resident commissioner of Galveston Island, Texas, made by José Manuel de Herrera, an envoy from the fledgling Republic of Mexico, who had declared Galveston a port of the Republic. Aury established a privateering base there in September 1816, where he continued his operations to smuggle enslaved persons into Spanish America.

One of Aury's privateers had captured a Spanish vessel from Tampico, and letters found on board revealed that the port of Soto La Marina on the Soto La Marina River (also called the Santander) in Mexico was undefended. Learning this, Gen. Francisco Mina and Col. Henry Perry resolved to make a descent upon the place, and Aury agreed to transport them. They sailed from Galveston April 6, 1817, and the town was taken without a fight. The three commanders squabbled, and Aury left with his ships for Galveston. Mina, whose plan was to join the southern Mexican revolutionaries led by Guadalupe Victoria, marched inland and was captured by royal Spanish troops and executed by firing squad on a hill close to the Fuerte de los Remedios.

== Amelia Island affair ==
Mexican insurgents' flag of 1815 flown by privateer Louis Aury

However, while Aury was away, the pirate Jean Lafitte had taken control of the base at Galveston. On his return to Texas, Aury made an ill-fated attempt to establish another base at Matagorda Bay. He finally left Texas in 1817 to assist the Scottish adventurer Gregor MacGregor, who claimed to be commissioned by representatives of the revolting South American countries, in attacking Spanish Florida from Amelia Island. MacGregor left the island on September 4, and Aury sailed into the port of Fernandina on September 17, 1817. Following negotiations with MacGregor's lieutenants, Ruggles Hubbard and Jared Irwin, Amelia Island was dubiously annexed to the Republic of Mexico on September 21, 1817, and its flag raised over Fort San Carlos. Aury surrendered the island to American forces under the command of Commodore J.D. Henley and Major James Bankhead on December 23, 1817. Aury remained over two months as an unwelcome guest; Bankhead occupied Fernandina and President James Monroe vowed to hold it "in trust for Spain". This episode in Florida's history became known as the Amelia Island Affair.

== Settlement in Old Providence and Saint Catherine islands ==
On 4 July 1818 Aury captured Old Providence Island (Isla de Providencia) in the western Caribbean with the help of 400 men and 14 ships. He found the island populated by white English-speaking Protestants and their slaves. Aury, Agostino Codazzi, and his team used the islands as his new base from which to pursue Central American independence and founded a settlement with a thriving economy based on captured Spanish cargo, while unsuccessfully trying to rebuild good relations with Bolívar. Under orders of Aury, Agostino Codazzi established the Fort Libertad on Saint Catherine Island.

== Project to conquer Panama for France ==
With the merchants of Kingston, Benoît Chassériau and Jean-Baptiste Pavageau and the privateer shipowner Jean-Baptiste de Novion, Aury had imagined in 1820 conquering Panama, then the possession of Spain. This project aimed to give France the means to strengthen and secure its trade in this region of the world. Unofficially, the Minister of the Navy and the Colonies, Pierre-Barthélémy Portal d'Albarèdes, declined their bold offer.

== Attempts to liberate Central America ==
In 1820 Guatemala City was still the capital of the Captaincy General of Guatemala, so Central America was seen as yet under the sway of Spain, and thus was open to attack from its enemies. In an attempt to secure their independence, the Gran Colombian insurgents and the Aury flotilla fitted a combined sea and land expedition to operate against the ports of Omoa and Trujillo, in Honduras.

On 21 April 1820, the watch-tower at Capiro in Trujillo Port announced the approach of a Colombian flotilla. The port's garrison, commanded by Jose M. Palomar, at once made emergency preparations for the impending attack. At two o'clock in the afternoon the approaching flotilla hoisted a flag with two blue bars and a white one between them showing an escutcheon in the center similar to the Argentinian flag; Aury dispatched a boat to shore to demand the port's surrender within one hour. The town did not comply. The following day Commodore Aury moved the flotilla to the mouth of the Guaimoreto River and began bombardment. The attack started at 9 AM and lasted until 2 PM. The firing ceased when the flotilla was ordered out to sea and out of the reach of the port's cannons. A portion of the land force then attempted to enter the town by the rear, but was detected and driven out.

During the night of the 24th, the Aury vessels dropped out of sight. On the 25th the flotilla appeared off the port of Omoa and for several days attempted to land. Commodore Aury failed and left the area on the 6th of May.

Some historians, for example Miguel Ángel de Marco, suggest that the flags of the United Provinces of Central America and most of the states that composed it were inspired by the Argentine Flag that privateer Hippolyte Bouchard took with him. Others claim that the flag was modeled on the Argentine flag, but introduced by Commodore Louis-Michel Aury.

Flags of Argentina, the United Provinces of Central America & Current National Flags

Argentina

United Provinces of Central America

Nicaragua

Honduras

El Salvador

Costa Rica

== Death ==
A document drawn up by the justice of the peace and chief of police of the isles of Santa Catalina and Old Providence reported Aury's death on August 30, 1821, possibly from being thrown by a horse. On September 3 of the same year, the same official made an inventory of Aury's possessions, which he left to his sister Victoire Aury (Madame Dupuis). Although he is not officially recognized by any of the countries he served, Aury was perceived as a member of the Great Colombia liberation fighters because of his affiliation with Simon Bolivar.

== Bibliography ==
- Schmidt, James M. (2012). Galveston and the Civil War: An Island City in the Maelstrom. Charleston, SC: History Press. ISBN 978-1-60949-283-0.
