= Tonyn (ship) =

Several vessels have been named Tonyn for Patrick Tonyn:

- Tonyn (1779 ship) was launched in 1766 at Philadelphia (or North Carolina), as Hyacinth. Between 1772 and 1775 Hyacinth made two voyages as a slave ship in the triangular trade in enslaved people. She was renamed Tonyn in 1779. An American warship captured her in 1781 after a single-ship action.
- Tonyn (1781 ship) was launched at Newfoundland in 1779 as Plato. Plato was renamed to Tonyn in 1781. She then traded with North America and as a West Indiaman. From 1797 she made two voyages as a slave ship in the triangular trade in enslaved people. She was captured and recaptured in 1798 on her first voyage, and sunk on her second circa 1800 as she was returning home.
- Tonyn (1782 ship) was a French vessel launched in 1777 under another name and taken in prize circa 1782. She was wrecked in 1783 on the bar at Saint Augustine, Florida. She had been on a voyage from Charles Town, South Carolina, to Saint Augustine and London.
