= Tonyn =

Tonyn may refer to:

- Patrick Tonyn (1725–1804), British general, governor of East Florida
- Tonyn (ship), several ships named for Patrick Tonyn
- Fort Tonyn, a former fort in Nassau County, Florida
