= List of shipwrecks in 1783 =

The List of shipwrecks in 1783 includes some ship sunk, wrecked or otherwise lost during 1783.

table of contents
1783
Jan	Feb	Mar	Apr
May	Jun	Jul	Aug
Sep	Oct	Nov	Dec
Unknown date

== January ==
=== 3 January ===
List of shipwrecks: 3 January 1783
Ship	State	Description
Fortune	Great Britain	The ship was driven ashore at Youghall, County Cork, Ireland. She was on a voyage from Saint Lucia to London.

=== 9 January ===
List of shipwrecks: 9 January 1783
Ship	State	Description
Graaf Schimmelmann	Hamburg	The ship ran aground on Heneaga and was abandoned. She was on a voyage from Port-au-Prince, Hispaniola to Hamburg.
Jonge Frederick	Denmark	The ship ran aground on Heneaga and was abandoned. She was on a voyage from Port-au-Prince to Hamburg.

=== 15 January ===
List of shipwrecks: 15 January 1783
Ship	State	Description
Barbara	Great Britain	The ship was wrecked on the Anholt Reef, in the Baltic Sea. She was on a voyage from Saint Petersburg, Russia to London.

=== 17 January ===
List of shipwrecks: 17 January 1783
Ship	State	Description
Swift	Great Britain	The ship foundered in the Atlantic Ocean. Her crew were rescued. She was on a voyage from Port Royal, Jamaica to London.

=== 21 January ===
List of shipwrecks: 21 January 1783
Ship	State	Description
Benjamin	Great Britain	The ship foundered off "Hisker Point". She was on a voyage from Great Yarmouth, Norfolk to Liverpool, Lancashire.
Ooste Ernes	Dutch Republic (correct); Russia (displayed)	The ship ran aground on the Goodwin Sands, Kent, Great Britain. She was on a voyage from Texel, Dutch Republic to Batavia, Indonesia.Ooste Ernes was abandoned the next day and became a wreck.
Prince de Kaunitz	France	The ship was wrecked on reefs off Corvo Island, Azores.

=== Unknown date ===
List of shipwrecks: Unknown date in January 1783
Ship	State	Description
Bernsteen Bruch	Prussia	The ship was wrecked at Memel. She was on a voyage from London, Great Britain to Memel.
Bos Van Ghitel	Spain	The ship was driven ashore and wrecked at Málaga, Spain. She was on a voyage from Málaga to a port in Flanders, Dutch Republic.
Chester	Great Britain	The ship was driven ashore near Formby, Lancashire. She was on a voyage from Tortola to Liverpool, Lancashire.
Concordia	Stettin	The ship was wrecked on the Seven Schaar, off Hogland, Russia. She was on a voyage from Bordeaux, France to Saint Petersburg, Russia.
Cornwall	Great Britain	The ship was driven ashore and wrecked near Swansey, Glamorgan with the loss of all but one of her crew. She was on a voyage from Hayle, Cornwall to Swansey.
Expedition	Great Britain	The ship was driven ashore and wrecked at Dungeness, Kent. She was on a voyage from Guernsey, Channel Islands to Hull, Yorkshire.
Friendship	Great Britain	The ship was driven ashore at Hurst Castle, Hampshire.
Josephus	Great Britain	The ship was lost at Ostend, Dutch Republic. She was on a voyage from London to Ostend and the West Indies.
Mars	France	The ship, a prize of Lightning (Great Britain), was driven ashore in Bootle Bay.
Salisbury	Great Britain	The ship ran aground in the River Thames at Erith, Kent and was wrecked. She was on a voyage from London to Jamaica.
Traveller	Great Britain	The ship was driven ashore and wrecked by a privateer at Spurn Point, Yorkshire. She was on a voyage from Saint Petersburg to London.

== February ==
=== 1 February ===
List of shipwrecks: 1 February 1783
Ship	State	Description
Demerary	Great Britain	The ship was driven ashore and wrecked at Leigh-on-Sea, Essex. She was on a voyage from Saint Lucia to London.

=== 3 February ===
List of shipwrecks: 3 February 1783
Ship	State	Description
Devonshire	Great Britain	The ship foundered in the Atlantic Ocean. Her crew were rescued by Llandovery (Great Britain).
Vlaamschee Zoen	Dutch Republic	The ship was abandoned in the Atlantic Ocane 50 leagues (150 nautical miles (280 km)) off Flores Island, Azores. Eleven of the seventeen people on board ultimately survived.

=== 4 February ===
List of shipwrecks: 4 February 1783
Ship	State	Description
Bourgogne	French Navy	The ship-of-the-line was wrecked at Curaçao with the loss of 80 of her 840 crew.

=== 7 February ===
List of shipwrecks: 7 February 1783
Ship	State	Description
York	Great Britain	The ship foundered in the Atlantic Ocean. She was on a voyage from Jamaica to Liverpool, Lancashire.

=== 9 February ===
List of shipwrecks: 9 February 1783
Ship	State	Description
Four Friends	Great Britain	The brig was driven ashore and wrecked at Portland, Dorset.
Vlaenderen	Dutch Republic	The ship was wrecked at St. Andero, Spain with the loss of all but five of her crew. She was on a voyage from San Sebastián to Havana, Captaincy General of Cuba.

=== 10 February ===
List of shipwrecks: 10 February 1783
Ship	State	Description
Jufrow Maria Anna	Dutch Republic	The ship was wrecked on the Dudgeon Bank, in the North Sea off the coast of Norfolk, Great Britain. She was on a voyage from Ostend to Tobago.
Young de Henloss Christient Hendrick	Grand Duchy of Tuscany	The ship was driven ashore at Portland, Dorset, Great Britain. She was on a voyage from Great Yarmouth, Norfolk to Livorno.
Young Ferdinand	Dutch Republic	The ship was driven ashore at Portland. Her crew were rescued. She was on a voyage from London, Great Britain to Sint Maarten.

=== 12 February ===
List of shipwrecks: 12 February 1783
Ship	State	Description
HMS Pallas	(Kingdom of Great Britain) Royal Navy	The fifth rate frigate was beached in Calheta Bay, Azores. She was set afire and destroyed on 24 February.

=== 14 February ===
List of shipwrecks: 14 February 1783
Ship	State	Description
Den Keyser van Deeyzsland	Dutch Republic	The ship was driven ashore in Tor Bay. She was on a voyage from Ostend to Saint Kitts. Den Keyser van Deeyzsland broke up on 4 March.

=== 15 February ===
List of shipwrecks: 15 February 1783
Ship	State	Description
Empress of Germany	Dutch Republic	The ship was driven ashore in Tor Bay. She was on a voyage from London, Great Britain to Ostend and Saint Kitts.

=== 17 February ===
List of shipwrecks: 17 February 1783
Ship	State	Description
HM Hired armed ship William	(Kingdom of Great Britain) Royal Navy	The ship was driven ashore and severely damaged at Black Rock, Lancashire. She was refloated and taken in to Liverpool for repairs.

=== 19 February ===
List of shipwrecks: 19 February 1783
Ship	State	Description
Loyalty	Great Britain	The ship was driven onto the Mount Batten Rocks, in the Cattewater. She was on a voyage from Waterford, Ireland to London. Loyalty was refloated in early March.

=== 21 February ===
List of shipwrecks: 21 February 1783
Ship	State	Description
HMS Cerberus	(Kingdom of Great Britain) Royal Navy	The fifth rate frigate was wrecked at Castle Harbour, Bermuda.

=== 25 February ===
List of shipwrecks: 25 February 1783
Ship	State	Description
Roode Gaarde	Prussia	The ship was driven ashore and wrecked near Great Yarmouth, Norfolk, Great Britain with the loss of two lives. She was on a voyage from Königsberg to London, Great Britain.
Verbo Eterno Incarnado	Portugal	The ship was driven ashore and wrecked at Sandown Castle, Kent, Great Britain. Her crew were rescued. She was on a voyage from London to Havre de Grâce, France.

=== 28 February ===
List of shipwrecks: 28 February 1783
Ship	State	Description
Whitburn	Great Britain	The ship was driven ashore and wrecked in Robin Hood's Bay. Her crew were rescued.

=== Unknown date ===
List of shipwrecks: Unknown date in February 1783
Ship	State	Description
Carriere de Salonico	(Ottoman Empire) Ottoman Greece	The ship was driven ashore and wrecked at Cherbourg, France. She was on a voyage from Málaga, Spain to Bruges, Dutch Republic.
George	Great Britain	The ship was driven ashore and wrecked near Boulogne, France with the loss of all but one of her crew. She was on a voyage from Jamaica to London.
James	Great Britain	The ship was driven ashore near Donaghadee, County Down, Ireland. She was on a voyage from Ayre to Guernsey, Channel Islands.
Leopold	Dutch Republic	The ship was driven ashore and wrecked on the south coast of the Isle of Wight, Kingdom of Great Britain with the loss of five of her crew. She was on a voyage from Morlaix, France to Ostend.
Luiza and Ann	Spain	The ship was driven ashore and wrecked near Appledore, Devon, Great Britain. She was on a voyage from Málaga to Biddiford, Devon.
Maglagard	Dutch Republic	The ship was damaged in a storm and put into Ilfracombe, Devon, Great Britain, where she sank. She was on a voyage from Guadeloupe to Ostend.
Marquis of Rockingham	Great Britain	The ship was captured and sunk by a privateer. she was on a voyage from Swansey, Glamorgan to Cork, Ireland.
Mercury	Great Britain	The ship was lost off Saint Tudwal's Islands, Caernarfonshire. Her crew were rescued. She was on a voyage from New York, United States to Liverpool, Lancashire.
Nossa Senhora do Carmo	Portugal	The ship was driven ashore at Figueira da Foz. She was on a voyage from Bristol, Gloucestershire, Great Britain to Porto.
Oldenburger	Great Britain	The ship was driven ashore and wrecked in the Isles of Scilly.
St Antonio e Almas	Portugal	The ship was driven ashore and wrecked at Towin, Merionethshire, Great Britain. She was on a voyage from São Miguel Island, Azores to London, Great Britain.

== March ==
=== 2 March ===
List of shipwrecks: 2 March 1783
Ship	State	Description
Friends Goodwill	Great Britain	The ship was driven ashore at Ballycastle, County Antrim, Ireland. She was on a voyage from Bristol, Gloucestershire to Londonderry, Ireland.

=== 3 March ===
List of shipwrecks: 3 March 1783
Ship	State	Description
Holker	United States	American Revolutionary War: The privateer capsized in a squall whilst engaged with HMS Alcmene ( (Kingdom of Great Britain) Royal Navy). Fourteen survivors were rescued by HMS Alcmene, but over 100 of her crew were lost.

=== 5 March ===
List of shipwrecks: 5 March 1783
Ship	State	Description
Count Belgioioso	British East India Company	The East Indiaman foundered in Dublin Bay with the loss of all 147 crew. Charles Spalding died whilst engaged in the salvage of her cargo in June 1783.
Benjamin	Great Britain	The ship foundered in the English Channel 9 leagues (27 nautical miles (50 km) off Berry Head, Devon. Her crew survived. She was on a voyage from London to a Welsh port. Her crew were rescued by HMS Jackal ( (Kingdom of Great Britain) Royal Navy).
Endeavour	Great Britain	The sloop struck rocks off Ramsgate, Kent and was abandoned by her five crew. They all drowned when their boat capsized. Endeavour was on a voyage from Ipswich, Suffolk to Southampton, Hampshire.
Jane and Isabella	Great Britain	The ship foundered in the North Sea off the coast of County Durham with the loss of all hands. She was on a voyage from North Shields, County Durham to Hamburg.
Venus	Great Britain	The ship was driven ashore near Hartlepool, County Durham.
Vigilant	Great Britain	The ship was run down and sunk by HMS Minerva ( (Kingdom of Great Britain) Royal Navy). Her crew were rescued.

=== 6 March ===
List of shipwrecks: 6 March 1783
Ship	State	Description
Graziosa Annetta	Republic of Venice	The ship ran aground and sank off Plymouth, Devon, Great Britain. She was on a voyage from Falmouth, Cornwall. Great Britain to Venice.
Inaver Sophia Elizabeth	Sweden	The snow was wrecked on the Goodwin Sands, Kent, Great Britain. Thirteen crew survived. She was on a voyage from Ostend, Dutch Republic to Málaga, Spain.
Industry	Great Britain	The ship was driven ashore and severely damaged north of Whitby, Yorkshire. She was on a voyage from Hull, Yorkshire to Whitby.

=== 25 March ===
List of shipwrecks: 25 March 1783
Ship	State	Description
Catharine the Second	Dutch Republic	The ship was driven ashore at Dungeness, Kent, Great Britain. She was on a voyage from Liverpool, Lancashire, Great Britain to Ostend.

=== 28 March ===
List of shipwrecks: 28 March 1783
Ship	State	Description
Catharina Maria	Rostock	The ship was wrecked at Anholt, Denmark. She was on a voyage from Rostock to London, Great Britain.

=== 29 March ===
List of shipwrecks: 29 March 1783
Ship	State	Description
Alida en Dirk	Dutch Republic	The whaler was driven ashore and wrecked at Lowestoft, Suffolk, Great Britain.

=== Unknown date ===
List of shipwrecks: Unknown date in March 1783
Ship	State	Description
Compte de Neny	Dutch Republic	The ship was wrecked at Ostend. She was on a voyage from Great Yarmouth, Norfolk, Great Britain to Ostend.
Frow Catharina	Dutch Republic	The ship was driven ashore and wrecked at Great Yarmouth. She was on a voyage from Ostend to Great Yarmouth.
Mary Ann	Great Britain	The ship was lost in Dublin Bay. She was on a voyage from New York to Cork, Ireland and Liverpool, Lancashire.
Peggy	Great Britain	The ship foundered in the Irish Sea. She was on a voyage from the Clyde to Guernsey, Channel Islands and the West Indies.
Vriendschap	Great Britain	The ship was wrecked on Texel. She was on a voyage from London to Amsterdam.
Warmley	Great Britain	The ship was driven ashore at Beaumaris, Anglesey. She was on a voyage from Tingmouth, Devon to Liverpool. Warmley was later refloated and taken in to Liverpool.

== April ==
=== 4 April ===
List of shipwrecks: 4 April 1783
Ship	State	Description
Pomona	Great Britain	The ship was driven ashore near Skagen, Denmark. She was on a voyage from Newcastle upon Tyne, Northumberland to a Baltic port.

=== 8 April ===
List of shipwrecks: 8 April 1783
Ship	State	Description
George	Great Britain	The ship was driven ashore and wrecked at "Wellingbeck", Denmark. She was on a voyage from Whitby, Yorkshire to Königsberg, Prussia.

=== 19 April ===
List of shipwrecks: 19 April 1783
Ship	State	Description
Duke of Atholl	British East India Company	The East Indiaman was destroyed by fire and exploded at Madras, India with some loss of life.
Mary	Great Britain	The ship was lost at Saint Augustine, Florida, British America. She was on a voyage from Saint Augustine to London.

=== 27 April ===
List of shipwrecks: 27 April 1783
Ship	State	Description
Watson	Great Britain	The ship was wrecked on the Gunfleet Sand, in the North Sea off the coast of Essex. Her crew were rescued. She was on a voyage from Aberdeen to London.

=== Unknown date ===
List of shipwrecks: Unknown date in April 1783
Ship	State	Description
Barbara	Great Britain	The ship was lost near Ostend, Dutch Republic. She was on a voyage from Ostend to London.
Bromley	Great Britain	The ship was lost whilst on a voyage from Rhode Island to New York, United States.
Charlotte	Great Britain	The ship capsized in a squall and was driven ashore at Beaumaris, Anglesey, where she was wrecked. She was on a voyage from Liverpool, Lancashire to Newry, County Antrim, Ireland.
Florida	Great Britain	The ship was lost near Messina, Sicily. She was on a voyage from London to Venice.
Florida	Great Britain	The ship foundered in the Irish Sea. She was on a voyage from Liverpool to Ostend.
Helena	Great Britain	The ship was lost near Dartmouth, Devon, Great Britain. She was on a voyage from Ostend to Dublin, Ireland.
Loinge Onsket	Dutch Republic	The ship was wrecked on the coast of Spain with some loss of life. She was on a voyage from Rotterdam to Surinam.
Mary	Great Britain	The ship was driven ashore between Danzig and Königsberg, Prussia. She was later refloated. Mary was on a voyage from London to Königsberg.
Prince Starenburg	Dutch Republic	The ship was driven ashore and wrecked at Dunkirk, France. She was on a voyage from Ostend to Guiney.
Rose	Great Britain	The ship was severely damaged in a storm at Bordeaux, France.
Swallow	Great Britain	The ship was lost at Ostend. She was on a voyage from Ostend to Pool, Dorset.
William	Great Britain	The ship was lost at Galway, Ireland with the loss of all but two of her crew. She was on a voyage from Bristol, Gloucestershire to Galway.

== May ==
=== 2 May ===
List of shipwrecks: 2 May 1783
Ship	State	Description
Eliza	Great Britain	The transport ship was lost on this date.

=== 22 May ===
List of shipwrecks: 22 May 1783
Ship	State	Description
Matthew and Thomas	Great Britain	The ship was struck by lightning and consequently destroyed by fire at Gravesend, Kent. She was on a voyage from Norway to London.

=== 24 May ===
List of shipwrecks: 24 May 1783
Ship	State	Description
Fidelity	Great Britain	The ship was wrecked on the Great Cumanas. Her crew were rescued. She was on a voyage from Jamaica to London.

=== 26 May ===
List of shipwrecks: 26 May 1783
Ship	State	Description
Union	France	The ship foundered in the English Channel off Dover, Kent, Great Britain. She was on a voyage from Dunkirk to Bordeaux.

=== Unknown date ===
List of shipwrecks: Unknown date in May 1783
Ship	State	Description
Carlisle	Great Britain	The ship was lost near Whitehaven, Cumberland. She was on a voyage from Liverpool, Lancashire to Carlisle, Cumberland.
Constance	France	The ship was driven ashore near Dunkirk. She was on a voyage from Dunkirk to Saint Domingo.
Damer	Denmark	The ship was driven ashore near Dunkirk. she was on a voyage from "Frederickstal" to Ostend, Dutch Republic.
Martha	Denmark	The ship was lost on the coast of Jutland. She was on a voyage from Copenhagen to Alderney, Channel Islands.
Monticucuell	France	The ship was driven ashore near Dunkirk. She was on a voyage from Dunkirk to Bordeaux.
Pomona	Great Britain	The ship was driven ashore at Skagen, Denmark. She was on a voyage from Newcastle upon Tyne, Northumberland to Memel, Prussia. Pomona was later refloated.
Rose	Great Britain	The ship was wrecked on the Spaniard sand. She was on a voyage from London to the Isle of Man.
Santa Anna	Spain	The ship was wrecked on the coast of Spain. She was on a voyage from Cádiz to Málaga.
Thomas & Jenny	Great Britain	The ship foundered whilst on a voyage from Falmouth, Cornwall to Gibraltar. Her crew were rescued.

== June ==
=== 3 June ===
List of shipwrecks: 3 June 1783
Ship	State	Description
Delight	Great Britain	The ship was wrecked near Tortuga. She was on a voyage from Grenada to Havana, Cuba.

=== 10 June ===
List of shipwrecks: 10 June 1783
Ship	State	Description
Sally and Betsey	Great Britain	The ship was lost on Læsø, Denmark. She was on a voyage from London to Stettin.

=== 15 June ===
List of shipwrecks: 15 June 1783
Ship	State	Description
Fairford	British East India Company	The East Indiaman was destroyed by a fire and on board explosion at Bombay, India. Her crew were rescued.

=== 18 June ===
List of shipwrecks: 18 June 1783
Ship	State	Description
HMS Nymph	(Kingdom of Great Britain) Royal Navy	The Swan-class sloop was destroyed by fire at Road Town, Tortola with the loss of three of her crew.
Success	Great Britain	The ship foundered in the Atlantic Ocean 5 leagues (15 nautical miles (28 km)) south west of Mousehole, Cornwall. Her crew were rescued. She was on a voyage from Liverpool, Lancashire to Livorno, Grand Duchy of Tuscany.

=== 20 June ===
List of shipwrecks: 20 June 1783
Ship	State	Description
Royal Emperor	Great Britain	The ship foundered in the Atlantic Ocean (38°00′N 46°20′W). Her crew survived. She was on a voyage from Jamaica to London.

=== Unknown date ===
List of shipwrecks: Unknown date in June 1783
Ship	State	Description
Stadt Cortrycht	Dutch Republic	The ship was wrecked at Bermuda. She was on a voyage from Dominica to Ostend.

== July ==
=== 6 July ===
List of shipwrecks: 6 July 1783
Ship	State	Description
Senhor De Mathizen	Portugal	The ship was wrecked on Gotland, Sweden. She was on a voyage from Lisbon to Saint Petersburg, Russia.

=== 7 July ===
List of shipwrecks: 7 July 1783
Ship	State	Description
Esther	Great Britain	The ship sprang a leak and foundered in the North Sea. Her crew were rescued by Beagle (Great Britain). Esther was on a voyage from Ostend, Dutch Republic to Saint Petersburg, Russia.

=== 11 July ===
List of shipwrecks: 11 July 1783
Ship	State	Description
Nicobar	Denmark	The ship was wrecked in False Bay with the loss of all but eleven of her crew.

=== 25 July ===
List of shipwrecks: 25 July 1783
Ship	State	Description
No. 3	Imperial Russian Navy	The ship was driven ashore and wrecked at the Farahabad Spit in the Caspian Sea. Her crew survived and burned the vessel. She was on a voyage from Astrakhan to Astrabad, Persia.

=== 30 July ===
List of shipwrecks: 30 July 1783
Ship	State	Description
Friendship	Great Britain	The ship foundered in the North Sea off Hamburg. Her crew survived. She was on a voyage from Memel, Prussia to a Cornish port.

=== Unknown date ===
List of shipwrecks: Unknown date in July 1783
Ship	State	Description
Blessing	Great Britain	The ship was lost at Poole, Dorset. She was on a voyage from Newcastle upon Tyne, Northumberland to Poole.
Choice	Great Britain	The ship foundered in the North Sea off Aldeburgh, Suffolk. She was on a voyage from Saint Petersburg, Russia to London.
Fame	Great Britain	The ship foundered in the English Channel off Chichester, Sussex. She was on a voyage from London to Lisbon, Portugal.
Phœnix	Great Britain	African slave trade: The Guineaman was lost at Calabar, Nigeria with the loss of 21 crew and all 420 slaves on board.

== August ==
=== 9 August ===
List of shipwrecks: 9 August 1783
Ship	State	Description
St. John Baptist	Great Britain	The ship departed from Kinsale, County Cork, Ireland for Virginia, United States. No further trace, presumed foundered in the Atlantic Ocean with the loss of all hands.

=== 10 August ===
List of shipwrecks: 10 August 1783
Ship	State	Description
Antelope	British East India Company	Antelope. The barque was wrecked off Ulong Island. Her crew survived.

=== 21 August ===
List of shipwrecks: 21 August 1783
Ship	State	Description
Duke of Kingston	British East India Company	The East Indiaman was destroyed by fire off Ceylon with the loss of 60 to 70 lives.

=== 23 August ===
List of shipwrecks: 23 August 1783
Ship	State	Description
Betsey	Great Britain	The ship was lost 18 nautical miles (33 km) west of Marstrand, Sweden. She was on a voyage from Königsberg, Prussia to Perth.

=== 24 August ===
List of shipwrecks: 24 August 1783
Ship	State	Description
Friends Endeavour	Great Britain	The ship foundered in the Atlantic Ocean. Her crew were rescued by a French Navy Sloop of War. She was on a voyage from Dartmouth, Devon to Newfoundland, British America.
United Friends	Great Britain	The ship departed from Sandy Hook, New Jersey, United States for an English port. No further trace, presumed foundered in the Atlantic Ocean with the loss of all hands.

=== Unknown date ===
List of shipwrecks: Unknown date in August 1783
Ship	State	Description
Graff Savory	Russia	The ship was wrecked on the Paternoster sand, in the Kattegat. She was on a voyage from Saint Petersburg to Hull, Yorkshire, Great Britain.
Hector	Great Britain	The ship was driven ashore near Liverpool, Lancashire. She was on a voyage from Liverpool to Africa.
Industry	Great Britain	The ship was driven ashore at Liverpool. She was on a voyage from "Wyburg" to Liverpool.
Isabella	Great Britain	The ship foundered in the English Channel off Chichester, Sussex. She was on a voyage from Ostend, Dutch Republic to Southampton, Hampshire.
Venus	Great Britain	The ship departed from Quebec, British America for Antigua. No further trace, presumed foundered with the loss of all hands.
Welvaart van Pruiser	Prussia	The ship was lost off Ameland, Dutch Republic. She was on a voyage from Königsberg to London, Great Britain.

== September ==
=== 5 September ===
List of shipwrecks: 5 September 1783
Ship	State	Description
William	Great Britain	The ship was wrecked on the French coast with some loss of life. She was on a voyage from Tortola to London.

=== 6 September ===
List of shipwrecks: 6 September 1783
Ship	State	Description
Gottenburg	Sweden	The ship was driven ashore at Hoylake, Cheshire, Great Britain. She was on a voyage from Livorno, Grand Duchy of Tuscany to Liverpool, Lancashire, Great Britain.
Hero	Great Britain	The ship was driven ashore at Liverpool.
Robert	Great Britain	The ship was driven ashore and wrecked on the coast of Ireland. She was on a voyage from Lancaster, Lancashire to the West Indies.

=== 9 September ===
List of shipwrecks: 9 September 1783
Ship	State	Description
Anna Christiana	Denmark	The ship was driven ashore and wrecked at Elsinore. She was on a voyage from Elsinore to Stettin.

=== 19 September ===
List of shipwrecks: 19 September 1783
Ship	State	Description
Mercury	France	The ship foundered in the Atlantic Ocean off Cape May, Delaware, United States with the loss of all but seven of her crew. She was on a voyage from Dunkirk to Philadelphia, Pennsylvania, United States.

=== 21 September ===
List of shipwrecks: 21 September 1783
Ship	State	Description
Hope	Great Britain	The ship was driven ashore at Falmouth, Cornwall.
Sankousio	Dutch Republic	The ship was driven ashore at Elsinore with the loss of two of her crew.

=== Unknown date ===
List of shipwrecks: Unknown date in September 1783
Ship	State	Description
Angel Gabriel	Great Britain	The ship was lost near Cherbourg, France. She was on a voyage from Danzig to Liverpool, Lancashire.
Briton	Great Britain	The ship was driven ashore near Middelburg, Dutch Republic. She was on a voyage from London to Ostend, Dutch Republic. She was later refloated and taken in to Vlissingen, Dutch Republic.
Financier	Great Britain	The ship was wrecked in the Isles of Scilly with the loss of three of her crew. She was on a voyage from Charles Town, South Carolina, United States to London.
Friendship	Great Britain	The ship was lost on the coast of Jutland. She was on a voyage from Narva, Russia to Kirkham, Lancashire.
Golden Lion	Great Britain	The ship was driven ashore and wrecked at Black Rock, Lancashire. She was on a voyage from Liverpool to the West Indies.
Industry	Great Britain	The sloop was wrecked on the coast of Norway.
Nancy	Great Britain	The ship foundered in Barnstaple Bay. Her crew were rescued. She was on a voyage from Jamaica to Bristol, Gloucestershire.
Nancy	Great Britain	The ship was lost in the Isles of Scilly. Her crew were rescued. She was on a voyage from Jamaica to London.
Purissima Conceptione	Spain	The ship foundered off "Stratton". Her crew were rescued.

== October ==
=== 3 October ===
List of shipwrecks: 3 October 1783
Ship	State	Description
Commerce	Great Britain	The ship was wrecked at sea. She arrived at Bermuda on 11 October and was condemned. Commerce was on a voyage from North Carolina, British America to Liverpool, Lancashire.

=== 4 October ===
List of shipwrecks: 4 October 1783
Ship	State	Description
John Giulian	Dutch Republic	The ship was driven ashore on Öland, Sweden. She was on a voyage from Amsterdam to Saint Petersburg, Russia.

=== 11 October ===
List of shipwrecks: 11 October 1783
Ship	State	Description
Betsey	Great Britain	The ship was driven ashore at Cape May, New Jersey, United States. She was on a voyage from Philadelphia to New York.
Count de Durat	France	The ship was driven ashore at Cape Henlopen, Delaware, United States. She was on a voyage from Philadelphia, Pennsylvania to Bordeaux.
Justice	Great Britain	The sloop was driven ashore on Cape Henlopen. She was on a voyage from Grenada to Philadelphia.
New-York	Great Britain	The ship was wrecked near Cape May, New Jersey, United States. She was on a voyage from Glasgow, Renfrewshire to New York and Philadelphia.
Nicobar	(Denmark) Danish Asiatic Company	The ship was lost near the Cape of Good Hope. There were twelve survivors. She was on a voyage from Copenhagen to India.
Patriot du Rouin	France	The ship was driven ashore at Cape Henlopen. She was on a voyage from Philadelphia to Dunkirk.
Sophia	Great Britain	The brig was driven ashore on Cape Henlopen.
Two Friends	Great Britain	The ship was driven ashore at Cape May. She was on a voyage from Philadelphia to New York.
Ville de Ostend	Dutch Republic	The ship was driven ashore in the Chesapeake River. She was on a voyage from Philadelphia to Virginia.

=== 24 October ===
List of shipwrecks: 24 October 1783
Ship	State	Description
Benjamin	Great Britain	The ship was driven ashore and wrecked at Cape Trafalgar, Spain. She was on a voyage from Newfoundland, British America to Naples, Kingdom of Sicily.
Betsey	Great Britain	The ship was wrecked on Hare Island, in the Saint Lawrence River with the loss of a crew member. She was on a voyage from Quebec, British America to Barbados.

=== Unknown date ===
List of shipwrecks: Unknown date in October 1783
Ship	State	Description
Adjua	Great Britain	The ship struck an anchor and sank in the River Thames. She was on a voyage from Grenada to London.
Amiable Louisa	Great Britain	The ship ran aground at the mouth of the Meuse (Dutch: Maas) and was abandoned by her crew. She was later refloatated and taken in to Rotterdam, Dutch Republic. Amiable Louise was on a voyage from London to Rotterdam.
Ann	Great Britain	The ship was wrecked on the Norwegian coast. She was on a voyage from Amsterdam, Dutch Republic to Liverpool, Lancashire.
Constant Friends	Great Britain	The ship was wrecked on the Gunfleet Sand, in the North Sea off the coast of Essex. She was on a voyage from London to Saint Petersburg, Russia.
Delight	Great Britain	The ship foundered in the Kattegat. She was on a voyage from London to Memel, Prussia.
Draper	Ireland	The ship was lost near Waterford with the loss of all hands. She was on a voyage from Bordeaux, France to Belfast, County Antrim.
Endeavour	Ireland	The ship was driven ashore at Ilfracombe, Devon, Great Britain. She was on a voyage from Dublin to Cádiz, Spain.
Hilston	Great Britain	The ship was driven ashore 7 leagues (21 nautical miles (39 km) north of Marstrand, Sweden. She was on a voyage from Hull, Yorkshire to Saint Petersburg, Russia.
Johanna	Sweden	The ship was driven ashore and wrecked on the south coast of the Isle of Wight, Great Britain. She was on a voyage from the Strait of Gibraltar to Stockholm.
John and Nelly	Great Britain	The ship foundered in the Atlantic Ocean with the loss of all hands. She was on a voyage from New York to Charleston, South Carolina, United States.
Juffrow Charlotta	Danzig	The ship foundered in the Kattegat. She was on a voyage from Danzig to Bristol, Gloucestershire, Great Britain.
Owners Adventure	Great Britain	The ship was driven ashore in the River Thames at Limehouse, Middlesex and was wrecked. She was on a voyage from South Shields, County Durham to London.
Singleton	Great Britain	The coaster was lost at South Shields.
Success	Great Britain	The ship was lost near "Argencon". She was on a voyage from Dunkirk, France to Boston.
Two Brothers	Great Britain	The ship sprang a leak and foundered in the Atlantic Ocean 4 leagues (12 nautical miles (22 km)) west of the Eddystone Lighthouse. Her crew survived. She was on a voyage from Dover, Kent to Philadelphia, Pennsylvania, United States.

== November ==
=== 2 November ===
List of shipwrecks: 2 November 1783
Ship	State	Description
Selina	Great Britain	The salatia was lost at "Alsaques" with the loss of three of her crew. She was on a voyage from "Bennicarlo" to Gibraltar.

=== 5 November ===
List of shipwrecks: 5 November 1783
Ship	State	Description
Hendrick	Hamburg	The brig was wrecked on the Goodwin Sands, Kent, Great Britain. Her crew were rescued. She was on a voyage from Hamburg to Porto, Portugal.

=== 6 November ===
List of shipwrecks: 6 November 1783
Ship	State	Description
Active	Great Britain	The ship was wrecked on the Sandhammer Reef, off the Swedish coast. She was on a voyage from Riga, Russia to London.

=== 7 November ===
List of shipwrecks: 7 November 1783
Ship	State	Description
HMS Superb	(Kingdom of Great Britain) Royal Navy	The Bellona-class ship of the line sank at Tellicherry, India with some loss of life.

=== 13 November ===
List of shipwrecks: 13 November 1783
Ship	State	Description
Elizabeth	Great Britain	The ship sprang a leak and was beached at Deal, Kent, where she was wrecked with the loss of a crew member. She was on a voyage from Swanage, Dorset to Ramsgate, Kent.

=== 14 November ===
List of shipwrecks: 14 November 1783
Ship	State	Description
Mary Ann	Great Britain	The ship was wrecked on the Oars sandbank, in the English Channel off the coast of Sussex. She was on a voyage from Jamaica to London.

=== 15 November ===
List of shipwrecks: 15 November 1783
Ship	State	Description
Nostra Señora de la Conception	Spain	The ship was wrecked on the Morant Cays. She was on a voyage from Cartagena, Viceroyalty of New Granada to Cádiz.

=== 16 November ===
List of shipwrecks: 16 November 1783
Ship	State	Description
Fruitful Vine	Great Britain	The brig was driven ashore and wrecked at Bembridge, Isle of Wight. She was on a voyage from Cork, Ireland to Havre de Grâce, France.

=== 17 November ===
List of shipwrecks: 17 November 1783
Ship	State	Description
Eigenheit	(Denmark) Norway	The ship was driven ashore and wrecked at Pegersick Cove, Cornwall, Great Britain. Her crew were rescued. She was on a voyage from Málaga, Spain to Hamburg.
Friendship	Great Britain	The ship departed from Newfoundland, British America on this date. No further trace, presumed foundered with the loss of all hands.
Industry	Great Britain	The brigantine was driven ashore at Weymouth, Dorset. She was on a voyage from Newfoundland to Pool, Dorset. She was later refloated and taken in to Weymouth.
Linderhurst	Dutch Republic	The galiot was driven ashore and wrecked at Portland, Dorset. She was on a voyage from Livorno, Grand Duchy of Tuscany to Amsterdam.
Sampson	Great Britain	The ship was wrecked on the Goodwin Sands, Kent. She was on a voyage from Virginia, United States to Amsterdam.

=== 18 November ===
List of shipwrecks: 18 November 1783
Ship	State	Description
Floret Commercium	Ottoman Empire	The ship was wrecked at Penzance, Cornwall, Great Britain. She was on a voyage from Gallipoli to Amsterdam, Dutch Republic.
Louis Auguste	France	The brig was driven ashore at Worthing, Sussex, Great Britain. She was on a voyage from Marseille to Havre de Grâce.

=== 21 November ===
List of shipwrecks: 21 November 1783
Ship	State	Description
Assistance	Great Britain	The ship was driven ashore and wrecked at Caernarfon. She was on a voyage from Liverpool, Lancashire to Africa.

=== 22 November ===
List of shipwrecks: 22 November 1783
Ship	State	Description
St Kitts Planter	Great Britain	The ship was driven ashore at Great Yarmouth, Norfolk. She was on a voyage from London to South Shields, County Durham and Saint Kitts.
Triton	Great Britain	The ship was wrecked on the Goodwin Sands, Kent. Her crew were rescued. she was on a voyage from Riga, Russia to Plymouth, Devon.

=== 23 November ===
List of shipwrecks: 23 November 1783
Ship	State	Description
Resolution	Great Britain	The ship departed from Newfoundland, British America for Lisbon, Portugal. No further trace, presumed foundered in the Atlantic Ocean with the loss of all hands.

=== 25 November ===
List of shipwrecks: 25 November 1783
Ship	State	Description
Thomas	Great Britain	The ship was driven ashore and wrecked near "Drakoe". She was on a voyage from Riga, Russia to Bristol, Gloucestershire.

=== 29 November ===
List of shipwrecks: 29 November 1783
Ship	State	Description
Amity's Friendship	Great Britain	The ship was driven ashore and wrecked at Whitby, Yorkshire. Her crew were rescued. She was on a voyage from Sunderland, County Durham to Dunkirk, France.

=== Unknown date ===
List of shipwrecks: Unknown date in November 1783
Ship	State	Description
Alliance	France	The ship was driven ashore at Audierne. She was on a voyage from the Charente to Dunkirk.
Ann & Amelia	Great Britain	The ship was lost near Madras, India.
Cornelia Petronella	Dutch Republic	The ship was wrecked on the Gunfleet Sand, in the North Sea off the coast of Essex, Great Britain. She was on a voyage from London, Great Britain to Amsterdam.
Dundee	Great Britain	The ship was lost at Narva, Russia with the loss of all on board.
George and James	Great Britain	The ship was driven ashore and wrecked near Boulogne, France. She was on a voyage from Philadelphia, Pennsylvania, United States to London.
Lady Mary	Ireland	The ship foundered in the Bay of Biscay. She was on a voyage from Cork to Bordeaux, France.
Mary	Great Britain	The ship was lost off "Hamlock". She was on a voyage from Königsberg, Prussia to Liverpool, Lancashire.
Orion	Great Britain	The ship was lost near the mouth of the Weser. Her crew were rescued. She was on a voyage from the Mediterranean to the Baltic.
Prudentia	Russia	The ship was lost whilst on a voyage from Saint Petersburg to Venice.
Seaflower	Ireland	The ship was driven ashore in St Magnus Bay, Shetland Islands, Great Britain. She was on a voyage from Memel, Prussia to Limerick.
Triton	Flag unknown	The ship was lost near the mouth of the Weser. Her crew were rescued. She was on a voyage from the Mediterranean to the Baltic.

== December ==
=== 8 December ===
List of shipwrecks: 8 December 1783
Ship	State	Description
Santa Maria Mayor	Portugal	The ship was lost on the Bank of Cajerie. She was on a voyage from Bengal to India to Lisbon.

=== 9 December ===
List of shipwrecks: 9 December 1783
Ship	State	Description
Polly	Great Britain	The ship was driven ashore in Steadingsbay, Denmark. She was on a voyage from Hull, Yorkshire to Königsberg, Prussia. She had been refloated by 20 December and taken in to Copenhagen for repairs.

=== 20 December ===
List of shipwrecks: 20 December 1783
Ship	State	Description
Snap Dragon	Great Britain	The ship was wrecked at Roquetas, Spain. Her crew survived. She was on a voyage from Newfoundland, British America to Alicante, Spain.

=== 24 December ===
List of shipwrecks: 24 December 1783
Ship	State	Description
Rodney	Great Britain	The ship was wrecked at Aberdeen.
Venus	Great Britain	The ship was wrecked at Aberdeen.

=== Unknown date ===
List of shipwrecks: Unknown date in December 1783
Ship	State	Description
Amiable Marie	France	The ship was driven ashore on the Île d'Oléron. She was on a voyage from St. Andero, Spain to Bordeaux.
Dona Maria Primeira	Portugal	The ship was driven ashore near Königsberg, Prussia. She was on a voyage from Lisbon to Riga, Russia.
Dudige Sophia	Russia	The ship was wrecked on Bornholm, Denmark. She was on a voyage from Saint Petersburg to Livorno, Grand Duchy of Tuscany and Ancona, Papal States.
Jonge Jacobus	Russia	The ship foundered off Mandahl, Norway. She was on a voyage from Dunkirk, France to Saint Petersburg.
Juffrow Helena Christina	Dutch Republic	The ship foundered in the English Channel off Quimper, France with the loss of all hands. She was on a voyage from Ostend to Bayonne, France.
Lady Gray	Great Britain	The ship was driven ashore near Ostend. She was on a voyage from Portsoy, Aberdeenshire to Dunkirk.
Marquess de Castries	France	The ship was driven ashore and wrecked at Hythe, Kent, Great Britain. She was on a voyage from Dunkirk to Nantes.
Mayflower	Great Britain	The ship was driven ashore and wrecked at Whitby, Yorkshire.
Polly	Great Britain	The ship was driven ashore and wrecked on Texel, Dutch Republic.
Sally	Ireland	The ship was driven ashore in Dublin Bay. She was on a voyage from Dublin to Baltimore, County Cork.
Sophia	Great Britain	The ship was lost in the Isles of Scilly. She was on a voyage from "Wyburg" to Liverpool, Lancashire.
Stephen	Great Britain	The ship foundered in Riga Bay.
Titus	Hamburg	The ship was wrecked at Schagen, Dutch Republic with the loss of all hands. She was on a voyage from Hamburg to Cork, Ireland.
Upland	Sweden	The ship was lost at Cherbourg, France. She was on a voyage from Stockholm to Plymouth, Devon, Great Britain.
Vrow Catherina	Dutch Republic	The ship was driven ashore and wrecked near Thisted, Denmark. She was on a voyage from Copenhagen, Denmark to Amsterdam.
Whitby	Great Britain	The ship was driven ashore at Whitby.

== Unknown date ==
List of shipwrecks: Unknown date in 1783
Ship	State	Description
Addison	Great Britain	The whaler was lost off Greenland. Her crew were rescued.
Adventure	Great Britain	The ship foundered in the Atlantic Ocean (65°N 35°W) between 27 November and 8 December. Her crew were rescued.
Ann and Mary	Great Britain	The ship was wrecked at Kingston, Jamaica. She was on a voyage from Kingston to London.
Aurora	Great Britain	The ship foundered off the coast of Cuba. Her crew were rescued. She was on a voyage from Jamaica to New York, United States.
Barbara	Great Britain	The ship was wrecked on Saint Lucia. She was on a voyage from Liverpool, Lancashire to Barbados.
Bella	Great Britain	The ship was lost on a voyage from Jamaica to Liverpool.
Blandford	Great Britain	The ship was lost on the Isle of Pines, Cuba. She was on a voyage from Jamaica to the Clyde.
Catharine	Great Britain	The ship was wrecked on Micone, Ottoman Greece, She was on a voyage from Smyrna, Ottoman Empire to London.
Catharine	Great Britain	The ship was wrecked at the "Cominas". She was on a voyage from Jamaica to Bristol, Gloucestershire.
Den Keyser	Great Britain	African slave trade: The ship was destroyed by an explosion at the "Isles de Loss". Most of her crew and 380 slaves were killed.
Dolphin	Great Britain	The ship was lost at Livorno, Grand Duchy of Tuscany. She was on a voyage from Newfoundland to Livorno.
Dragón	Spanish Navy	The 60-gun ship-of-the-line was wrecked.
Elizabeth	Great Britain	Captain Massey's ship was lost in the Grand Banks of Newfoundland.
Elizabeth	Great Britain	Captain Tozer's ship foundered in the Atlantic Ocean 600 nautical miles (1,100 km) east of Newfoundland. Her crew were rescued by a French vessel.
Fawn	Great Britain	The ship was driven ashore and severely damaged at St. John's, Newfoundland.
Fly	Great Britain	The ship was sunk by ice with some loss of life. She was on a voyage from Lisbon, Portugal to Newfoundland, British North America.
Grace	Great Britain	The ship was lost on the coast of Africa. She was on a voyage from Antigua to Africa.
Griffin	Great Britain	The ship was lost on the coast of Africa. She was on a voyage from Antigua to Africa.
Hinchinbrook	British East India Company	The East Indiaman was driven ashore at Culpee, India.
Hope	Great Britain	American Revolutionary War: The ship was captured by two American Letters of Marque and was subsequently lost. She was on a voyage from Lisbon to Newfoundland.
Hope	Great Britain	The ship was lost whilst on a voyage from Tortola to Quebec.
Huzzar	Great Britain	The ship was driven ashore and wrecked on Long Island, Rhode Island, United States. She was on a voyage from Jamaica to New York.
Indfødsretten	Denmark	The ship-of-the-line was on its way home from Tranquebar in 1783 and had called at Cape of Good Hope. She disappeared with all hands in the Atlantic. Some identifiable wreckage was washed up in southern Ireland in 1784
John	Great Britain	The ship foundered in the Grand Banks of Newfoundland.
Jupiter	Great Britain	The transport ship was lost off Cape May, Delaware, United States with the loss of two of her crew. She was on a voyage from Jamaica to New York.
Lady Howe	Great Britain	The ship ran aground in the Saint Lawrence River and was wrecked. She was on a voyage from Jamaica to Quebec City, British America.
Lion	Great Britain	The transport ship was lost off Cape Sable, Florida, British America.
Mary	Great Britain	The ship struck a rock and was wrecked at Tobago.
Myrtle	Great Britain	The ship was driven ashore at Bencoolen, India.
Noble	Great Britain	The ship was lost near Quebec City. She was on a voyage from Halifax to Quebec City.
Othello	Great Britain	African slave trade: The ship was wrecked at Tortola before 8 July. A total of 213 slaves were rescued.
Peace and Plenty	Great Britain	The ship was wrecked on Cape Cod, Massachusetts, United States. All on board were rescued.
Peggy	Great Britain	The ship foundered in the Atlantic Ocean off Cape Hatteras, North Carolina, United States. She was on a voyage from Tortola to New York.
Peter	Great Britain	The ship was lost near Halifax, Nova Scotia, British North America. She was on a voyage from Saint Lucia to Halifax.
Polly	Great Britain	The ship was lost on St Peter's Island with the loss of six of her crew. She was on a voyage from Falmouth, Cornwall to Quebec.
Reward	Great Britain	The ship was lost in the Gambia River. Her crew were rescued.
Rodney	Great Britain	The snow was lost on the "Grand Camaines". She was on a voyage from Jamaica to London.
Sally	Great Britain	The ship was destroyed by fire at Jamaica.
Sally	Great Britain	The ship struck a rock off the coast of Cuba. She put into Havana, where she was condemned. Sally was on a voyage from Jamaica to London.
Sampson	Great Britain	The ship was wrecked on Cape Breton Island, Nova Scotia with the loss of four of her crew. She was on a voyage from Whitehaven, Cumberland to Quebec.
Septentrión	Spanish Navy	The 60-gun ship-of-the-line was wrecked.
St. James	Great Britain	The transport ship was driven ashore on Staten Island, New York, United States.
Success	Ireland	The ship was lost on Cape Henlopen. She was on a voyage from Antigua to Philadelphia.
Tonyn	Great Britain	The ship was lost at Saint Augustine, Florida, British America. She was on a voyage from Charles Town, South Carolina, United States to Saint Augustine and London.
Warren	British East India Company	The East Indiaman foundered in the Atlantic Ocean. Her crew were rescued by Duke of Richmond (Great Britain).
