= John Young (naval officer) =

American Continental Navy officer (c.1740–1781)

- Born: 1740
- Died: March 1781 (aged 40–41); Caribbean Sea
- Burial place: Lost at Sea
- Military career
- Allegiance: United States
- Branch: Continental Navy
- Service years: 1765–1781
- Rank: Captain
- Units: USS Independence
- Commands: USS Saratoga
- Conflicts: American Revolutionary War

John Young (c. 1740–1781) was a captain in the Continental Navy during the American Revolutionary War, commander of the Saratoga which was lost at sea.

== Background ==
He began his seafaring career at an early age in the colonial merchant marine and, at the start of the American Revolution, was commissioned 23rd on the list of captains in the Continental Navy. On 20 September 1776, the Continental Congress directed Young to take the sloop-of-war USS Independence to Martinique to protect American mercantile shipping in the West Indies. Collaterally, Independence was to raid British shipping whenever the opportunity arose.

On 5 July 1777, Young was ordered to Nantes, France, and subsequently arrived at Lorient with two prizes. On 17 February 1778, while in French waters, he sailed through the French Fleet, saluting that nation's government with a 13-gun salute. In return he received a nine-gun salute, one of the earliest salutes rendered by the French government to the fledgling American government. At the time, John Paul Jones was on board Independence.

Young returned to America in the spring of 1778 and successively commanded two Pennsylvania privateers, Buckskin and Impertinent, before he was given command of the sloop-of-war Saratoga - then fitting out at Philadelphia—in May 1780. Young took her to sea on 13 August 1780 and, in the course of the ship's first cruise, captured one prize before she returned to port for repairs and alterations.

Subsequent cruises were more successful, as Young commanded Saratoga on three more sweeps at sea in which he took a total of eight more prizes. Young proved himself a daring and resourceful commander. On one occasion, he took Saratoga between two British ships and captured both. Largely as a result of his dedication and emphasis on training, Saratoga compiled a distinguished, but altogether brief, record before her untimely and unexplained loss.

Saratoga set sail from Cap-Haïtien, in what is now Haiti, on 15 March 1781. After taking a prize three days later, the sloop-of-war became separated from her later that day when a strong gale swept through the area, the high winds nearly swamping the prize commanded by Midshipman Penfield. After the storm passed by, Saratoga was nowhere to be seen, having vanished without a trace.

The United States Navy named two ships, USS Young (DD-312), and USS John Young (DD-973) in his honor.

== See also ==
- List of people who disappeared mysteriously at sea
