= 104th Regiment of Foot (King's Volunteers) =

Infantry regiment of the British Army from 1761 to 1763

The 104th Regiment of Foot (King's Volunteers) was a short-lived infantry regiment of the British Army active during the Seven Years' War.

On 10 August 1761 Patrick Tonyn, an officer in the 6th (Inniskilling) Dragoons, was promoted to the rank of lieutenant-colonel and authorised to raise a regiment of foot. The regiment was duly formed by the regimentation of six independent companies as the 104th Foot in October 1761. The regiment served in Martinique before being disbanded in 1763.
