= USS Saratoga (1780) =

1780 American naval sloop

History

United States
- Name: USS Saratoga
- Builder: Wharton & Humphries, Philadelphia
- Laid down: December 1779
- Launched: April 10, 1780
- Fate: Lost at sea on March, 18 1781 in a gale

General characteristics
- Type: Sloop
- Tons burthen: 150 (bm)
- Length: 68 ft (21 m)
- Beam: 25 ft 4 in (7.72 m)
- Draft: 12 ft (3.7 m)
- Complement: 86 officers and enlisted
- Armament: 16 × 9-pounder guns; 2 × 4-pounder guns

USS Saratoga was an 18-gun sloop of the Continental Navy. She was named in honor of the Battles of Saratoga. Having disappeared in 1781, her fate remains a mystery. Saratoga was built at Philadelphia, Pennsylvania by Wharton and Humphries. Her keel was laid in December 1779 and she was launched on April 10, 1780.

== First cruise ==
=== Diplomatic escort ===
Commanded by Captain John Young, Saratoga departed Philadelphia on August 13, 1780 escorting the packet, Mercury, which was sailing for Europe carrying Henry Laurens. The former President of the Continental Congress was planning to seek money on the European continent to finance the American government.

Two days later, the Saratoga passed frigates Trumbull and Deane in the upper Delaware Bay. Captain Young and Henry Laurens communicated with the frigates and they were to join Saratoga in a cruise as a squadron. The frigates, continued on up the Delaware River to replenish at Philadelphia.

After waiting in vain for the frigates to return, Saratoga and Mercury passed through the Delaware Capes out to sea by themselves. Because of inadequate ballast, the Saratoga was unstable under a heavy spread of canvas and was forced to proceed much more slowly than the Mercury. Thus, the Mercury was forced to heave to each night to allow the Saratoga to catch up. This schedule continued until August 23, when Henry Laurens released the Saratoga from her escorting duty with the suggestion that she "...make a short cruise and then return to Philadelphia..." Afterwards, the unescorted Mercury was captured by the British off Newfoundland and Laurens was imprisoned in England.

=== Hunting off Delaware ===
For more than a fortnight, Captain Young operated east of the shipping lanes while he trained his crew in operating their ship and fighting her guns. On the afternoon of September 9, a lookout spotted a sail to the northwest. By then, Young had managed to get Saratoga into fighting shape.

He headed his ship toward the unknown sail and set out in pursuit. By twilight, he was close enough to see that his quarry was a brig flying British colors. Some two hours later, Saratoga had closed within hailing distance and learned that the chase was the Royal Navy's brig, HMS Keppel, and not about to surrender. Saratoga opened fire with a broadside and was quickly answered by Keppel, opening an inconclusive, three-hour battle. During the action, due to gale force seas, coinciding with her insufficient ballast, the Saratoga's guns were unable to inflict any serious damage on Keppel. After Captain Young’s repeated efforts to close to boarding distance of the Keppel and the British brig evading those efforts, and midnight approaching, Young ordered the helmsman to end the chase and head for home.

=== Capture of the Sarah ===
Three days later, as Saratoga approached Cape Henlopen, she came upon the Sarah, a British ship bound for New York laden with rum from the West Indies. The merchantman surrendered without resisting, and the two ships proceeded into the Delaware. They anchored off Chester, Pennsylvania, the following afternoon where the Sarah was promptly condemned and sold, along with her cargo, which brought the continental treasury funds desperately needed to refit the frigate, Confederacy, for sea.

== Second cruise ==
Saratoga spent three days at Chester, where she replenished her stores and took on additional iron for ballast before heading back down the Delaware toward the open sea and another cruise. She cleared the Delaware Capes on September 18 and sailed northward along the New Jersey coast. A week later, off the Jersey highlands, she came upon the 60-ton American brig, Elizabeth, which had been taken in Chesapeake Bay several weeks before by the British privateer Restoration. Saratoga recaptured Elizabeth, and Young sent the brig to Philadelphia under a prize crew.

Saratoga remained in the vicinity of the Jersey highlands without encountering any further ships. Toward the end of the month, she turned south. Saratoga cruised parallel to the coast. Young constantly exercised her crew at her guns and in her rigging to sharpen their fighting capability. The crew had an opportunity to prove their seamanship when on October 10 they safely brought their ship through a storm with but superficial damage. This same storm damaged the British squadron which Admiral George Rodney had sent out of New York to patrol the American coast.

=== Capture of the Charming Molly and Two Brothers ===
That night, she turned north again. At dawn the next day, Saratoga spotted two sails far off her port bow. She was due east of Cape Henry when Saratoga began the chase. As she closed the distance between herself and her quarry, Young ordered his helmsman to head for the open water between the British ships which proved to be the large 22-gun privateer Charming Molly and the schooner Two Brothers. When Saratoga was between the two vessels, Young ordered Charming Molly to surrender, but she refused to do so. After Saratoga had fired a broadside into Charming Molly, a boarding party, led by Lieutenant Joshua Barney, leapt onto the merchantman's deck and initiated a fierce hand-to-hand fight which soon compelled the ship's captain to strike his colors.

An American prize crew under Barney promptly took the place of Charming Molly's crew. Young then set out after the fleeing Two Brothers which, when overtaken, surrendered without resistance and promptly headed for the Delaware for libeling in Admiralty court in Philadelphia.

=== Further prizes ===
From the prisoners captured on Charming Molly, Young learned that she and Two Brothers had been part of a small merchant fleet which had sailed from the British colony of Jamaica and had been scattered by the recent storm. As soon as his crew had finished temporary repairs to Charming Molly's battle-damaged hull, Saratoga began to search for the remaining merchant fleet, a ship and two brigs. About mid-day on October 11, a lookout saw three sails slowly rise above the horizon dead ahead, and another chase began. As Saratoga approached the British ships, Young ordered his helmsman to head between them. As she passed between the ships, Sartoga fired both broadsides, her port guns fired at Elizabeth, and her starboard muzzles belched fire and iron at the brig Nancy. The fleet's shots passed above Saratoga, causing only minor damage to her rigging while the first American salvo knocked Nancy out of action and did substantial damage to Elizabeth, which surrendered after taking another volley. Meanwhile, the other brig raced away; and Young, being busy with his two new prizes, allowed her to escape free of pursuit.

Saratoga's crew labored repairing the battered hulls of the prizes before sending them toward the Delaware Capes. About midnight, Saratoga herself got underway northward. At dawn, near Cape Henlopen, a blue jacket sailor aloft reported seeing two unknown sails, one dead ahead and the other several miles off her port quarter. The first was later identified as American brig, Providence which was at that time a British prize heading for New York. The second ship was the 74-gun British ship of the line Alcide. Despite the proximity of Alcide, Young set out after Providence and recaptured her after about an hour's chase. Young quickly put a prize crew on board Providence and then Saratoga got underway for the Delaware. Saratoga was anchored off Chester, Pennsylvania, at dawn on October 14.

== Cruise to the Caribbean ==
On December 15, after being refitted at Philadelphia, Saratoga got underway for Hispaniola to pick up a load of French military supplies which were awaiting transportation to America. New officers and men had come on board to replace those who had left the ship to man her prizes. A number of merchantmen awaited her just inside the capes hoping to be escorted to a safe offing. On the morning of October 20, favorable weather enabled Saratoga to put to sea escorting her 12 charges. The next afternoon, after one of the merchantmen signaled that an unknown sail had appeared, Saratoga set out to investigate. Within two hours, after seeing the Red Ensign flying from her stern, Saratoga had reached within firing range and sent a warning 4-pounder shot across the stranger's bow. Instead of surrendering, the British privateer, Resolution, maneuvered to attack. The ships fired at the same instant, Resolution's gunners fired high and only did superficial damage to Saratoga. Saratoga's broadside damaged the Resolution's hull and superstructure and forced her to surrender.

Young embarked the Resolution's crew in Saratoga as prisoners; and placed an American crew on the prize. The two ships then headed toward Cape Henlopen which they reached on New Year's Day, 1781. Young turned his prisoners over to the Continental agent at Lewes, Delaware, and headed the Saratoga back toward the Caribbean the same day. On the morning of January 9, 1781, off the coast of East Florida, Saratoga captured the 20-gun privateer Tonyn in a fierce battle. Tonyn had recently sailed from St. Augustine, Florida laden with turpentine, indigo, hides, and deerskins intended for Liverpool. Young spent a day repairing Tonyn and Saratoga's rigging, then the two ships got underway on the morning of January 11 for Hispaniola. On the 16th, Saratoga captured, without resistance, the armed brig Douglas, which was carrying wine from Madeira to Charleston, South Carolina, a Southern port then under British control. Young sent this prize to Philadelphia.

=== Escort duty and loss ===
On January 27, Saratoga and Tonyn reached Cap-Français, Saint-Domingue where Young turned Tonyn over to the French admiralty courts and arranged to have Saratoga docked to have her hull scraped and coated with pitch while awaiting the arrival of military cargo and French Navy frigates to assist in convoying a fleet of Allied merchantmen. The governor of Saint Dominique, Jean-François, comte de Reynaud de Villeverd, suggested that Saratoga join the a group of ships consisting of Continental Navy frigate Deane, American privateer Confederacy, merchantman Fair American and French navy brig Cat in a cruise through the Windward Passage to Jamaica. The squadron departed Cap-Français on February 20 and returned eight days later with the British ship Diamond, which they had captured as she approached Jamaica laden with goods taken by the British during Rodney's capture of the Dutch colony of St. Eustatius.

By mid-March, all was ready. The French warships were on hand; the Continental warships were loaded, and 29 heavily laden merchant ships were in the harbor awaiting escorts. The convoy left from Cap-Français on the March 15. Three days later, a lookout high over the Saratoga's deck reported two sails far off to westward, the Saratoga left the convoy in pursuit of the strangers. About mid-afternoon, she caught up with one of the fleeing ships which surrendered without a fight. Captain Young placed an American crew on board the prize and got underway after the second ship. Midshipman Penfield, commander of the prize crew, later reported that as he was supervising his men's efforts to follow the Saratoga, the wind suddenly rose to fearful velocity and almost capsized his ship. When he had managed to get the snow-rigged merchantman back under control, he looked up and was horrified to learn that the Saratoga had vanished. After numerous successful victories and prizes, Saratoga disappeared, lost at sea. The Saratoga's fate remains a mystery.

She was lost March 18, 1781, with all hands drowned, she had captured one of two British ships sighted and was in pursuit of the second one when last seen. The Prize ship was almost capsized in a sudden burst of wind, and Saratoga vanished, probably capsized and sunk in the gust, casualties recorded as "86 less the prize crew."
