= USS Deane (1778) =

History

United States
- Name: USS Deane
- Namesake: Silas Deane
- Commissioned: 1778
- Decommissioned: 1783
- Renamed: USS Hague, September 1782

General characteristics
- Type: Frigate
- Tonnage: 550
- Length: 96 ft (29 m)
- Beam: 32 ft (9.8 m)
- Armament: 24 × 12-pounder (5 kg) guns; 8 × 4-pounder (1.8 kg) guns; 2 × 6-pounder (2.7 kg) guns

Service record
- Commanders: Capt. Samuel Nicholson; Capt. John Manley

USS Deane was a 34-gun frigate of the Continental Navy. She was renamed USS Hague in 1782, and was decommissioned in 1783.

== Career ==
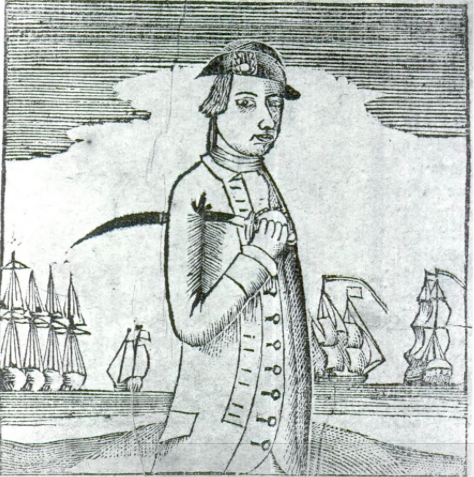
Wood block portrait of Manley

She was originally secretly ordered by the American Commissioners from the Nantes shipowner Jean Peltier Dudoyer. This 400 ton 'merchant' ship, then named Lyon, with 32 gun emplacements, was fitted with 24 cannons and was built by Bourmaud. The number of cannons attracted the attention of the local maritime authorities, who notified the Minister of Marine. Having been paid through a Paris banker, Jean Peltier denied any other use apart from trade, and, on 3 November 1777, indicated in the deed of purchase that there was "absolutely no foreign involvement" and that the ship would be commanded by a Frenchman, Barthélémy Corvaisier, on the voyage to Santo Domingo.

Even though suspicions had not completely disappeared, fortunately French intentions towards the USA had changed and Jean Peltier was encouraged to hasten the preparation of the ship. On 12 February 1778, the Lyon joined the Duc de Choiseul and the Brume in Saint Nazaire to then sail to the Quiberon Bay, where the escort of La Motte-Picquet was waiting to accompany them the 900 km to the United States. However disagreements with Samuel Nicholson led to the departure of a large number of the French crew, including Nicolas Baudin, and the embarkation of 102 American 'passengers'. An agreement was signed between Jonathan Williams and Nicholson and Corvaisier stepped down. Nicholson took command and renamed the ship Deane after American Founding Father Silas Deane.

Under the command of Nicholson, Deane sailed from Boston 14 January 1779 with Alliance for a cruise in the West Indies. On 14 February the ship was present at the 13-gun salute by John Paul Jones fired from the 'Ranger' and the 9-gun salute in response from La Motte-Picquet, in recognition of the American nation. She returned to Philadelphia 17 April with one prize, the armed ship Viper. On 29 July she joined with USS Boston and two ships of the Virginia Navy guarding a convoy of merchantmen out to sea and continuing on for a five-week cruise which netted eight prizes, including four privateers, the packet Sandwich, and the sloop-of-war HMS Thorn. The frigates arrived at Boston 6 September with 250 prisoners after one of the most notable cruises of the Continental Navy.

During the winter and early spring of 1781 Deane cruised with Confederacy and Saratoga in the West Indies. In May, Lloyd's List reported that the rebel frigates Dean and Protector had captured John, Ashburner, master, from Lancaster to St. Kitts, and a ship sailing from Glasgow to Jamaica with 90-0 barrels of beef and a quantity of dry goods, and had taken them into Martinique. Deane again cruised with Confederacy and Saratoga in the West Indies in 1782, capturing four prizes. In April 1782 she captured the cutter HMS Jackal. After two more cruises in the Caribbean, one in September 1782 and the other in 1783, she was renamed Hague in September 1782 (perhaps because of false accusation against Deane that was current at the time).

== Fate ==
Deane was taken out of commission in 1783 at Boston.

== Bibliography ==
Tugdual de Langlais, L'armateur préféré de Beaumarchais … Jean Peltier Dudoyer, de Nantes à l'Isle de France, Coiffard Éditions, Nantes, 2015, 340 p.

Howard I. Chapelle, The History of the American Sailing Navy – The ships and their Development. W.W. Norton & Company, inc. - New-York – 1949, p 97, 537.
