= Tonyn (1781 ship) =

Newfoundland slave and merchantman ship sunk on her second voyage in 1800

History

Great Britain
- Name: Plato
- Namesake: JamesLetter 24/9/1779 Joseph Rogers to James Rogers
- Owner: James Rogers, Bristol
- Operator: James Rogers
- Ordered: 1779
- Builder: Joseph Rogers
- Cost: 1400 pounds sterling Letter 4/11/1779 Joseph Rogers to James Rogers
- Laid down: 1779
- Launched: 1779, Newfoundland
- Acquired: Built by owners
- Commissioned: Reg. 22/10/1779 St. John's NL
- Decommissioned: Sunk 00/01/1800
- Renamed: Tonyn (1781)
- Captured: 1798 (and recaptured)
- Fate: Wrecked circa 1800

General characteristics
- Tons burthen: 179, 190, or 196, or 220 (bm)
- Length: 81 ft 0 in (24.7 m)
- Beam: 23 ft 0 in (7.0 m)
- Complement: 20
- Armament: 1797: 16 × 4&6-pounder guns; 1799: 8 × 4-pounder + 8 × 6-pounder guns
- Notes: Two decks & three masts

Tonyn was launched at Newfoundland in 1779, as Plato. Plato was renamed to Tonyn in 1781. She then traded with North America and as a West Indiaman. From 1797, she made two voyages from Liverpool as a slave ship in the triangular trade in enslaved people. She was captured and recaptured in 1798 on her first voyage, and sunk on her second circa 1800, as she was returning home.

== Career ==
Tonyn was launched as Plato and renamed in 1781. Missing pages in extant issues of Lloyd's Register (LR) has resulted in her first appearing in LR in 1781.

| Year | Master | Owner | Trade | Source & notes |
|---|---|---|---|---|
| 1781 | M.Winters | Rogers & Co. | Bristol–Newfoundland | LR "now the Tonyn, Welch" |
| 1782 | W.Haseldine | | Liverpool–New York | LR; ex-Plato |

Because a second Tonyn, and a third Tonyn, also of about 200 tons (bm), were sailing out of Liverpool, there was some initial confusion between the three vessels. (Note: An American warship captured the second Tonyn, Wade, master, in 1781. The third Tonyn, Welch, master, was wrecked in 1783.)

| Year | Master | Owner | Trade | Source & notes |
|---|---|---|---|---|
| 1786 | W.Hafeldine; Henry Crane | J.Kenyon | Liverpool–New York | LR; repairs 1783 |
| 1787 | H.Crane; T.Parr | J.Kenyon | Liverpool–New York; Liverpool–Barbados | LR; repairs 1783 |
| 1790 | T.Parr; J.Sall | J.Kenyon | Liverpool–Barbados | LR; repairs 1783 & 1789 |
| 1794 | J.Sall | J.Kenyon | Liverpool–Barbados | LR; repairs 1783 & 1789 |
| 1795 | R.Watson; T.Yates | J.Kenyon | Liverpool–Barbados | LR; repairs 1783, 1789, & large repair 1794 |
| 1796 | T.Yates; J.Crow | J.Kenyon | Liverpool–Barbados | LR; repairs 1783, 1789, & large repair 1794 |
| 1797 | J.Crow; T.Smith | J.Kenyon | Liverpool–Barbados | LR; repairs 1783, 1789, large repair 1794, and repairs 1795 & 1796 |

1st voyage transporting enslaved people (1797–1798): Captain Thomas Smith acquired a letter of marque on 15 April 1797. He sailed from Liverpool on 12 May, bound for Calabar. In 1797, 90 vessels sailed from Liverpool to West Africa to participate in the slave trade. Tonyn arrived at St Croix on 16 December, with 314 captives.

At the time Saint Croix was a Danish colony. In 1792, the Danish government passed a law that from early 1803 on, would outlaw Danish participation in the trans-Atlantic enslaving trade. This led the government in the Danish West Indies to encourage the importation of captives prior to the ban taking effect. One measure that it took was to open the trade to foreign vessels. Records for the period 1796 to 1799 show that 24 British enslaving ships, most of them from Liverpool, arrived at St Croix and imported 6,781 captives.

Tonyn apparently sailed from St Croix directly back to Calabar. There she picked up a cargo of palm oil and "elephant's teeth" (ivory tusks). On 14 March 1798, the French privateer Buonaparte captured her. (Note: Bonapart was a popular name for French privateers so absent further information it is not possible to pin down which Bonapart was the captor.) Then on 21 March, a squadron under the command of Captain Sir John Borlase Warren, in the 74-gun third rate Canada, and including Phaeton and Mermaid, recaptured Tonyn. Tonyn, Smith, master, prize to Canada, arrived at Plymouth on 29 March. She arrived back at Liverpool on 6 May. By the time she arrived at Plymouth, only one of her original crew remained aboard Tonyn. She had sailed from Liverpool with 29 crew members and had suffered eight crew deaths on her voyage.

| Year | Master | Owner | Trade | Source |
|---|---|---|---|---|
| 1798 | T.Smith; Phillips | J.Gibbons | Liverpool–Africa | LR; repairs 1783, 1789, large repair 1794, and repairs 1795 & 1796 |
| 1799 | T.Phillips | J.Gibbons | Liverpool–Africa | LR; repairs 1783, 1789, large repair 1794, and repairs 1795 & 1796 |

2nd voyage transporting enslaved people (1798–1799): Captain James Towers sailed from Liverpool on 21 November 1798, bound for the Congo River. That year 149 vessels sailed from Liverpool on voyages to transport enslaved people. Tonyn arrived at Kingston on 22 August 1799, with 299 captives, having first stopped at Martinique. She may have embarked 326 captives.

== Fate ==
In January 1800, Lloyd's List reported that Tonyn, Towers, master, had been sunk in Waterford harbour after having been run into. She had been on her way from Jamaica to Liverpool. She had left Liverpool with 38 crew members and she had suffered 16 crew deaths on her voyage. Her entry in the 1800 volume of the Register of Shipping carried the annotation "Lost".

In 1800, 34 British slaving vessels were lost, at least four were lost on the homeward leg of their voyage. In 1800, 133 British vessels sailed on enslaving voyages, 120 from Liverpool. The 34 vessels lost represent a 26% loss rate.
