= HMS Thorn =

Three vessels of the Royal Navy have borne the name HMS Thorn:

- HMS Thorn (1779) was a 14-gun sloop launched in 1779 that two American frigates, USS Deane and USS Boston captured on 25 August 1779. She became an American privateer with a number of successful engagements and prizes to her name. Arethusa captured her on 20 August 1782. She then returned to service in the Royal Navy, serving until 1816 when she was sold.
- HMS Thorn (1900) was a destroyer launched in 1900 and broken up in 1919.
- HMS Thorn (N11) was a submarine launched in 1941 and sunk in the Mediterranean in 1942.
