= HMS Keppel (1778) =

Brig of the Royal Navy

History

Great Britain
- Name: HMS Keppel
- Namesake: Augustus Keppel, 1st Viscount Keppel
- Acquired: 1778 by capture
- Fate: Sold 1783

General characteristics
- Tons burthen: 75 (bm)
- Armament: Privateer:16 × 6&4-pounder guns + swivel guns; Royal Navy: 14 × 4-pounder guns

HMS Keppel was the American privateer brig New Broome, of New Haven, Connecticut, that Ariel and Savage captured on 21 October 1778. She was sold on 5 August 1783 at Boston.

Captain Israel Bishop received a commission for New Broome in July 1778.

Ariel, under the command of Captain Charles Phipps, captured New Broom on 22 October 1778, as well as the schooners Lark and Three Friends. New Broom was armed with 16 guns and had sailed from New London when Ariel and Savage stopped her off Nantucket shoals and sent her into New York.

The British Royal Navy purchased her in Boston that month. She was commissioned under Lieutenant Richard Whitworth.

In September–October 1779, Keppel was part of the Royal Navy's squadron at the siege of Savannah.

In the evening of 9 September 1780 Keppel, under the command of Lieutenant Robert Steel had an inconclusive, three-hour single-ship action with USS Saratoga. The engagement led to Steel's promotion to Master and Commander.

On 17 June 1781 Keppel, Captain Steel, accompanied the brig Sir Henry Clinton and the sloop Association, which carried a small group of Loyalists who conducted a successful raid on Patriot blockhouses on Leete's Island, near Sachem Head.
