= USS Independence (1776 sloop) =

Sloops-of-war of the United States Navy

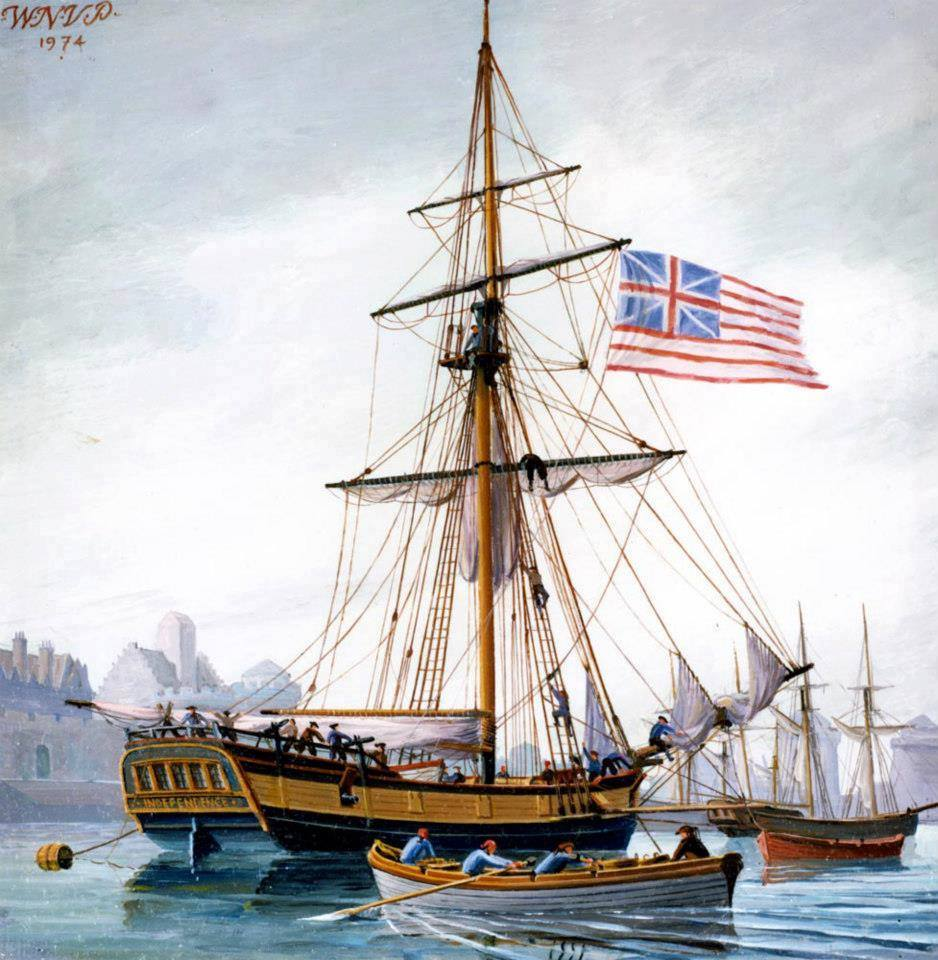
- 1974 painting of Independence by William Nowland Van Powell

History

United States
- Name: USS Independence
- Namesake: Freedom from control by others; self-government
- Builder: built in Baltimore, Maryland
- Laid down: date unknown
- Acquired: by the Marine Committee
- In service: circa September 1776
- Out of service: 24 April 1778 (wrecked)
- Honors and awards: received salutes to the new American Republic from a foreign nation
- Fate: Wrecked on the bar 24 April 1778 while attempting to enter Okracoke Inlet, North Carolina

General characteristics
- Type: sloop
- Displacement: not known
- Length: not known
- Beam: not known
- Draft: not known
- Propulsion: sloop sail
- Speed: not known
- Complement: not known
- Armament: 10 guns

USS Independence was a 10-gun sloop of the Continental Navy. Acting as a dispatch boat, she was sent to France on a diplomatic mission – carrying important dispatches. While there, John Paul Jones embarked on her, and she received additional salutes to the American Republic from the French.

== Continental Navy service ==
Independence was a Continental sloop built in Baltimore, Maryland, and purchased and fitted out by the Marine Committee.

In September 1776 she cruised under Captain John Young along the Atlantic Ocean coast to the Caribbean Sea to guard American merchant trade in the West Indies.

In mid-1777 she sailed for France, arriving at Lorient in late September with important diplomatic dispatches. She captured two prizes en route and disposed of these in France before the Royal Navy could interfere.

She was in Quiberon Bay 14 February 1778 when John Paul Jones in Ranger received the first national salute to the flag—the first official recognition of the American Republic by a foreign power. The following morning, Jones embarked in Independence and again exchanged salutes.

== Wrecked on the bar ==
Independence soon sailed for the United States. She was wrecked on the bar 24 April 1778 while attempting to enter Ocracoke Inlet, North Carolina. The wreck was heavily salvaged, including her guns, cargo and ship's bell.

== See also ==
- Continental Navy
- American Revolution
