= Tonyn (1782 ship) =

History

Great Britain
- Name: Tonyn
- Namesake: Patrick Tonyn
- Launched: 1777, France
- Acquired: 1782 by purchase of a prize
- Fate: Wrecked 1783

General characteristics
- Tons burthen: 190 or 200 (bm)
- Complement: 40 (1781)
- Armament: 1781: 18 × 9&12-pounder guns; 1782: 20 × 6-pounder guns

Tonyn was a French vessel launched in 1777 under another name and taken in prize circa 1782. She first appeared in the 1782 volume of Lloyd's Register (LR).

Year	Master	Owner	Trade	Source & notes
1782	P.Welch	T.Moss	Liverpool–New York	LR; good repair 1782

Captain P.Welsh acquired a letter of marque on 13 August 1781.

Lloyd's List reported in November 1783 that Tonyn, Welch, master, had been lost on the bar at Saint Augustine, Florida. She had been on a voyage from Charles Town, South Carolina, to Saint Augustine and London. The LR volume for 1783 carried the annotation "Lost" by her name.

Most of the crew saved themselves by lashing themselves to rafts. A female passenger and her child drowned after they refused to allow themselves to be lashed to a raft.

This Tonyn may have been a replacement for a Tonyn, also of 200 tons (bm), that Thomas Moss had lost the year before to capture.
