= Tonyn (1779 ship) =

History

Great Britain
- Name: Hyacinth
- Launched: 1766, Philadelphia, or North Carolina
- Renamed: Tonyn (1779)
- Captured: 9 January 1781

General characteristics
- Tons burthen: 140, or 199, or 200 (bm)
- Complement: 40-45
- Armament: 18 × 6-pounder guns + 4 swivel guns (1781)

Tonyn was launched in 1766 at Philadelphia (or North Carolina), as Hyacinth. Between 1772 and 1775 Hyacinth made two voyages as a slave ship in the triangular trade in enslaved people. She was renamed Tonyn in 1779. An American warship captured her in 1781 after a single-ship action.

== Hyacinth ==
Hyacinth was registered at Liverpool in 1772.

1st voyage transporting enslaved people (1772–1773): Captain James Salcraig sailed from Liverpool on 10 April 1772, bound for Bassa. Hyacinth arrived in Jamaica in early 1793. She had left Liverpool with 40 crew members and she had 12 when she arrived in Jamaica. She sailed from Jamaica on 25 July and arrived back at Liverpool on 20 September.

2nd voyage transporting enslaved people (1774–1775): Captain Salcraig sailed from Liverpool on 3 January 1774. On 25 July she was among the slaver ships "all well" at Bassa. Hyacinth arrived at St Johns, Antigua, on 4 March 1775 with 285 captives. She sailed on 11 April and arrived back at Liverpool on 26 May.

Hyacinth first appeared in online volumes of Lloyd's Register (LR) in the 1776 issue.

Year	Master	Owner	Trade	Source & notes
1776	J.Salcraig; Jn.Jordan	Foxcroft	Liverpool–Africa & etc. Cork transport	LR
1778	J.Jordan	T.Foxcroft	Quebec–Cork; Cork–New York	LR; repairs 1776

== Tonyn ==
Tonyn first appeared in LR in 1779.

Year	Master	Owner	Trade	Source & notes
1779	J.R.Wade	Thomas Moss	Liverpool–South Carolina	LR; good repairs 1776 & 1779
1781	J.R.Wade	Moss & Co.	Liverpool–South Carolina	LR; good repairs 1776, 1779, & 1780

Captain John Robinson Wade acquired a letter of marque on 20 July 1779. In May 1780, Tonyn, Wade, master, captured a prize worth £1,300.

Governor Tonyn (Tonyn) arrived at St Augustine on 26 October 1780 after a voyage of eight weeks from Liverpool. She initially anchored offshore and vessels came out of St Augustine to take off her cargo. Then on 4 December she was able to cross the bar and come up to the town. There she fired salutes and later hosted a dinner for Governor Tonyn and numerous other local gentlemen and officers of the garrison.

Tonyn sailed for Liverpool on 5 January 1781; she was very leaky and it was expected that she might stop at Charleston if necessary.

== Fate ==
The sloop USS Saratoga captured Tonyn on 9 January 1781. Saratoga took Tonyn into Cap-Français.

The capture, after a fierce battle, took place off the coast of East Florida. Tonyn had recently sailed from St. Augustine laden with turpentine, indigo, hides, and deerskins intended for Liverpool. Captain Young, of Saratoga, spent a day repairing Tonyn and Saratoga's rigging, then the two ships got underway on the morning of 11 January for Hispaniola. On 27 January, Saratoga and Tonyn reached Cap-Français, where Captain Young turned Tonyn over to the French Admiralty court.

On 28 March word arrived at St Augustine that Tonyn had been captured. The schooner Hero, Perry, master, sailed on 9 April for Cap-Français under a flag of truce to bring back Captain Wade and his crew. Hero returned on 26 April bringing only Wade, who had been badly wounded in the engagement with Saratoga, and Tonyn's doctor. Tonyn had been sold for £2,800; her cargo of turpentine had sold for a poor price.
