= Patrick Tonyn =

British Army officer and colonial administrator

General Patrick Tonyn
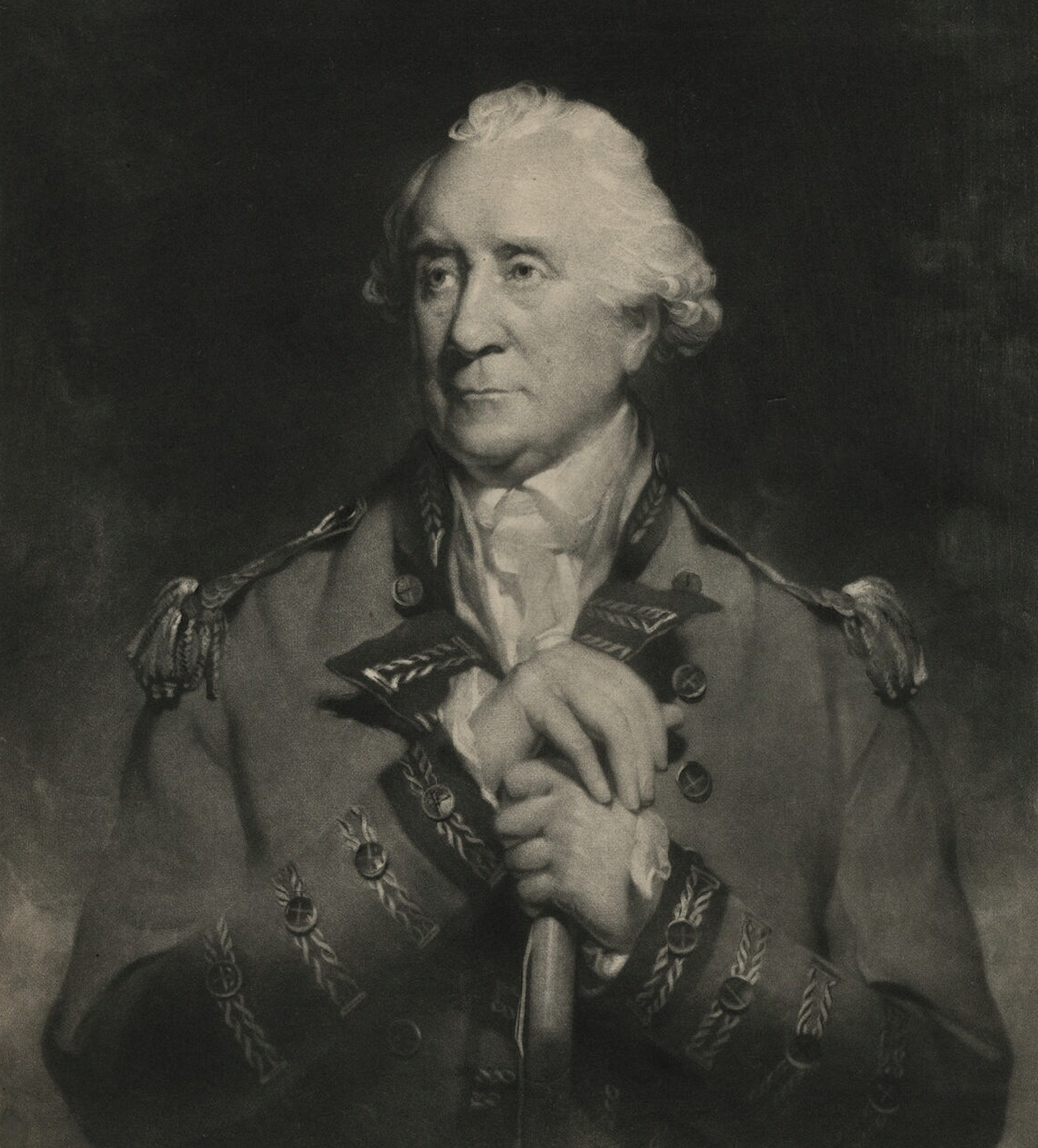
- Engraving by George Clint after a Martin Archer Shee portrait, 1804

Governor of East Florida
- In office 1 March 1774 – 12 July 1784
- Preceded by: John Moultrie
- Succeeded by: Vicente Manuel de Céspedes

Personal details
- Born: 1725 Berwick-upon-Tweed, Northumberland
- Died: 30 December 1804 (aged 78–79) London, England

Military service
- Allegiance: Great Britain; United Kingdom
- Branch/service: British Army
- Years of service: 1744–1805
- Rank: General
- Battles/wars: Seven Years' War; American Revolutionary War; French Revolutionary Wars

General Patrick George Tonyn (1725 – 30 December 1804) was a British Army officer and colonial administrator who served as the governor of East Florida from 1774 to 1784. His governorship lasted the span of the American Revolutionary War, with East Florida being a Loyalist stronghold during the conflict.

== Early life ==
Patrick George Tonyn was born in Berwick-upon-Tweed in Northumberland in 1725, into a military family. His father, Charles Tonyn, was a Colonel in the 6th (Inniskilling) Dragoons. Patrick Tonyn became a captain in the 6th Dragoons in 1751, and served with that regiment in Germany during the Seven Years' War. In 1759 the regiment fought at Minden and Wetter with great distinction. Tonyn was made lieutenant-colonel of the 104th Regiment of Foot in 1761.

== Life in Florida and Revolution ==
Tonyn is generally described as a capable commander. During his tenure as governor of East Florida the colony enjoyed peace with the neighboring Indians, primarily due to his positive relationship with Ahaya the Cowkeeper, chief of the Alachua band of the Seminole tribe.

Like most favored British officers, Tonyn received a large grant in the new colony—a 20,000-acre (81 km^{2}) tract in 1767. This area of land was just south of Black Creek. Nautralist William Bartram, during his 1774 travels, noted that Tonyn's land grew indigo well. Bartram counted twenty enslaved workers when passing by the plantation. After a 1776 raid from Georgia, Tonyn was forced to give up this land for a plot east of the St. Johns River.

Fort Tonyn, which was located in present-day Nassau County, Florida, near the hamlet of Mills's Ferry was named after Tonyn.

On 1 March 1774, Tonyn arrived in St. Augustine, Florida as royal governor of East Florida. Throughout Tonyn's governorship, Loyalists from southern colonies sought refuge in St. Augustine. Another group was added to the population of the city when Andrew Turnbull's colony of New Smyrna to the south collapsed. Tonyn released the group (composed largely of Minorcans) from their indentures, and they too settled in St. Augustine in 1777.

During the American Revolution, Tonyn raised four black militia units in East Florida. Those who served were promised freedom. However, due to the efforts of slave owners and the passing of stricter slave codes, few of those who fought were granted their freedom.

From 1778 – 1785, Governor Tonyn lived in the coquina dwelling at 143 St. George Street in St. Augustine, in what is known today as the Peña-Peck House, run by the Woman's Exchange of St. Augustine.

Tonyn was instrumental in bringing his brother-in-law planter Francis Levett, an Englishman, to East Florida, having Levett given a seat on the Royal Council. Formerly a merchant in Leghorn, Italy, working for the Levant Company in Constantinople and scion of a well-connected English merchant family, Levett took up a large grant in Florida, which he later abandoned in favor of Georgia, where he was one of the first growers of Sea Island cotton. Levett's son-in-law Dr. David Yeats served as Secretary of the province of Florida under Governor Tonyn.

== London and death ==
Tonyn was the victim in a fraud and deception trial at the Old Bailey in May 1796. Henry Weston was indicted for forging Tonyn's signature to transfer of £5,000. The Old Bailey records show that Weston, a young man with gambling debts, was sentenced to death.

Patrick Tonyn died in London on 30 December 1804.

== See also ==
- Tonyn (ship) – several vessels named for him circa 1780.

Preceded by Major John Moultrie	Governor of British East Florida; 1774–1784	Succeeded by Vicente Manuel de Céspedes y Velasco – Governor of Spanish East Florida
Preceded by Robert Skene	Colonel of the 48th Regiment of Foot; 1787–1805	Succeeded by Lord Charles Fitzroy
